= Miscegenation in Asia =

Interracial relationships in Asia

Miscegenation is marriage or admixture between people who are members of different races. The word was coined in English from Latin miscere ('to mix') and genus ('race'). There is a long history of miscegenation in Asia. Greek and Macedonian soldiers intermarried with local populations of northwest India after Alexander's conquest in 4th century BCE. Inter-ethnic marriages in Southeast Asia have deep historical roots, beginning with Indian traders intermarrying with local populations from the 1st century onwards, resulting in the rise of Indianized kingdoms. From the 9th century, Arab traders also settled in the region, marrying local women and spreading Islam. This pattern of intermarriage continued with Chinese, Indian, and Arab traders during the 14th to 17th centuries, as well as Portuguese and Japanese traders.

In China, inter-ethnic relationships were initially discouraged, but Persian men were present in Guangzhou from the 10th to 12th centuries, becoming part of the local community. The Ming dynasty enforced intermarriage between Central Asian, Mongol, and Chinese populations to ensure integration. This trend of intermarriage included Tibetan, Uyghur, and later Russian-Chinese unions, which were encouraged for perceived genetic benefits.

During the Vietnam War, numerous Amerasians were born from relationships between American soldiers and Vietnamese women, with estimates of their numbers ranging from 15,000 to 30,000. World War II also saw Japanese soldiers engaging in sexual violence across East and Southeast Asia, resulting in mixed-race offspring. Post-war, sex tourism became prevalent, particularly in Bali, where local men formed relationships with female tourists from various countries.

In Central and South Asia, inter-ethnic marriages were common, with Central Asians descending from a mix of Mongols, Turks, and Iranians. The Hazara people of Afghanistan have Mongolian ancestry due to Turco-Mongol invasions. India saw significant intermarriage, especially in Goa, with Portuguese men marrying Indian women. The Anglo-Indian community emerged from British-Indian unions, which declined post-1857 rebellion due to anti-miscegenation laws.

== History ==
Inter-ethnic marriage in Southeast Asia dates back to the spread of Indian culture, Hinduism and Buddhism to the region. From the 1st century onwards, mostly male traders and merchants from the Indian subcontinent frequently intermarried with the local female populations in Cambodia, Burma, Champa, Central Siam, the Malay Peninsula, and Malay Archipelago. Many Indianized kingdoms arose in Southeast Asia during the Middle Ages.

From the 9th century onwards, a large number of mostly male Arab traders from the West Asia settled down in the Malay Peninsula and Malay Archipelago, and they intermarried with the local Malay, Indonesian and female populations in the islands later called the Philippines. This contributed to the spread of Islam in Southeast Asia. From the 14th to the 17th centuries, many Chinese, Indian and Arab traders settled down within the maritime kingdoms of Southeast Asia and intermarried with the local female populations. This tradition continued among Portuguese traders who also intermarried with the local populations. In the 16th and 17th centuries, thousands of Japanese people also travelled to Southeast Asia and intermarried with the local women there.

From the tenth to twelfth century, Persian women were to be found in Guangzhou (Canton), some of them in the tenth century like Mei Zhu in the harem of the Emperor Liu Chang, and in the twelfth century large numbers of Persian women lived there, noted for wearing multiple earrings and "quarrelsome dispositions". Multiple women originating from the Persian Gulf lived in Guangzhou's foreign quarter, they were all called "Persian women" (波斯婦 Po-ssu-fu or Bosifu). Some scholars did not differentiate between Persian and Arab, and some say that the Chinese called all women coming from the Persian Gulf "Persian Women".

The Ming Hongzu Emperor passed a law in the Ming code's article 122 which said that Central Asian Semu women and Mongol women must marry Chinese men and that Central Asian Semu men and Mongol men must marry Chinese women. If the Central Asian Semu and Mongol women and men refused to intermarry with Chinese, they were to be punished by being enslaved and beaten 80 times and they were banned from marrying men and women of their own ethnicities. The exception were the Qincha and Hui Muslims who looked different to Chinese so Chinese did not have to marry them and they were not required to intermarry with Chinese.

The exact number of Amerasians in Vietnam are not known. The U.S. soldiers stationed in Vietnam had relationships with locals females, many of the women had origins from clubs, brothels and pubs. The American Embassy once reported there were less than a 1,000 Amerasians. A report by the South Vietnamese Senate Subcommittee suggested there are 15,000 to 20,000 children of mixed American and Vietnamese blood, but this figure was considered low. Congress estimated 20,000 to 30,000 Amerasians by 1975 lived in Vietnam. According to Amerasians Without Borders, they estimated about 25,000 to 30,000 Vietnamese Amerasians were born from American first participation in Vietnam in 1962, and lasted until 1975. Although during the Operation Babylift it was estimated at 23,000.

During World War II, Japanese soldiers engaged in war rape during their invasions across East Asia and Southeast Asia. Some Indo Dutch women, captured in Dutch colonies in Asia, were forced into sexual slavery. More than 20,000 Indonesian women and nearly 300 Dutch women were so treated. A estimated 1000 Timor women and girls who also used as sexual slaves. Melanesian women from New Guinea were also used as comfort women by the Japanese military and as well married Japanese, forming a small number of mixed Japanese-Papuan women born to Japanese fathers and Papuan mothers. The Indonesian invasion of East Timor and West Papua caused the murders of approximately 300,000 to 400,000 West Papuans and many thousands of women raped.

Sex tourism has emerged in the late 20th century as a controversial aspect of Western tourism and globalization. Sex tourism is typically undertaken internationally by tourists from wealthier countries. Author Nils Ringdal alleges that three out of four men between the ages of 20 and 50 who have visited Asia or Africa have paid for sex. Female sex tourism also emerged in the late 20th century in Bali. Tens of thousands of single women throng the beaches of Bali in Indonesia every year. For decades, young Balinese men have taken advantage of the louche and laid-back atmosphere to find love and lucre from female tourists—Japanese, European and Australian.

== Central Asia ==
In the pre-Islamic and early Islamic eras (c. 1000 and earlier) Central Asia was inhabited predominantly by Iranian peoples, populated by Eastern Iranian-speaking Bactrians, Sogdians, Chorasmians, and the semi-nomadic Scythians and Dahae. As the result of Turkic migration, Central Asia also became the homeland for the Kazakhs, Kyrgyzs, Tatars, Turkmens, Uyghurs, and Uzbeks; Turkic languages largely replaced the Iranian languages spoken in the area, with the exception of Tajikistan and areas where Tajik is spoken. Central Asians have descended from a mixture of various peoples, such as the Mongols, Turks, and Iranians. The Mongol conquest of Central Asia in the 13th century resulted in the mass killings of the Iranian-speaking people and Indo-Europeans population of the region, their culture and languages being superseded by that of the Mongolian-Turkic peoples. The remaining surviving population intermarried with invaders. Genetic shows a mixture of East Asian and West Eurasian ancestry in all Central Asian people.

Interracial marriage between Turkic, European, Central Asians in Kazakhstan are rare but increasing. The most common marriages are between Kazakh and Volga Tatars. Intermarriage usually involves Kazakh men, due to Muslim tradition favouring male over female. For example, 1% were between Russians, Tatars, and Kazakhs (792 between Russians and Tatars, 561 between Kazakhs and Tatars, and 212 between Kazakhs and Russians). 701 Kazakh men married Russians or Tatars, against only 72 Kazakh women. Among Kirgiz men living in Uzbekistan and married to non-Kirgiz women, 9.6% had married Russians, 25.6% Uzbeks, and 34.3% Tatars. Among Kazakh men in Uzbekistan, the structure of mixed marriages appeared as follows: 4.4% married Russians.

== Afghanistan ==
Genetic analysis of the Hazara people indicate partial Mongolian ancestry. Invading Mongols and Turco-Mongols mixed with the local Iranian population, forming a distinct group. Mongols settled in what is now Afghanistan and mixed with native populations who spoke Persian. A second wave of mostly Chagatai Mongols came from Central Asia and were followed by other Mongolic groups, associated with the Ilkhanate and the Timurids, all of whom settled in Hazarajat and mixed with the local, mostly Persian-speaking population, forming a distinct group.

The analysis also detected Sub-Saharan African lineages in both the paternal and maternal ancestry of Hazara. Among the Hazaras there are 7.5% of African mtDNA haplogroup L with 5.1% of African Y-DNA B. The origin and date of when these admixture occurred are unknown but was believed to have been during the slave trades in Afghanistan.

== China ==
Intermarriage was initially discouraged by the Tang dynasty. In 836 Lu Chun was appointed as governor of Canton, he was disgusted to find Chinese living with foreigners and intermarriage between Chinese and foreigners. Lu enforced separation, banning interracial marriages, and made it illegal for foreigners to own property. Lu Chun believed his principles were just and upright. The 836 law specifically banned Chinese from forming relationships with "dark peoples", which was used to describe foreigners, such as "Iranians, Sogdians, Arabs, Indians, Malays, Sumatrans", among others.

Iranian, Arab, and Turkic women also occasionally migrated to China and mixed with Chinese. From the tenth to twelfth century, Persian women were to be found in Guangzhou (Canton), some of them in the tenth century like Mei Zhu in the harem of the Emperor Liu Chang, and in the twelfth century large numbers of Persian women lived there, noted for wearing multiple earrings and "quarrelsome dispositions". Multiple women originating from the Persian Gulf lived in Guangzhou's foreign quarter; they were all called "Persian women" (波斯婦; Po-szu-fu or Bosifu). Iranian female dancers were in demand in China during this period. During the Sui dynasty, ten young dancing girls were sent from Persia to China. During the Tang dynasty bars were often attended by Iranian or Sogdian waitresses who performed dances for clients.

During the Five Dynasties and Ten Kingdoms Period (Wudai) (907–960), there are examples of Persian women marrying Chinese emperors. Some Chinese officials from the Song Dynasty era also married women from Dashi (Arabia).

The Ming Hongwu emperor married off his own son Zhu Shuang to a Mongol woman, Consort Minlie, of the Wang clan (愍烈妃 王氏; d. 1395), the primary consort, younger sister of Köke Temür.

During the Ming, many Han blurred the category of Huihui together with Tatar (Mongol), labeling the sons, daughters and wives of Tatars (Mongols) as Huihui people in official documents, since different non-Han groups like Mongols and Hui could marry each other, so Han arbitrarily confused them together in documents.

Han women who married Hui men became Hui, and Han men who married Hui women also became Hui.

Of the Han Chinese Li family in Quanzhou, Li Nu, the son of Li Lu, visited Hormuz in Persia in 1376, married a Persian or an Arab girl, and brought her back to Quanzhou. He then converted to Islam. Li Nu was the ancestor of the Ming Dynasty reformer Li Chih.

In the frontier districts of Sichuan, numerous half Chinese-Tibetans were found. Tibetan women were glad to marry Chinese traders and soldiers. Some Chinese traders married Tibetan girls. Traders and officials in ancient times were often forbidden to bring Chinese women with them to Tibet, so they tended to marry Tibetan women; the male offspring were considered Chinese and female offspring as Tibetan. Special names were used for these children of Chinese fathers and Tibetan mothers. They often assimilated into the Tibetan population. Chinese and Nepalese in Tibet married Tibetan women.

Chinese men also married Turkic Uyghur women in Xinjiang from 1880 to 1949. Sometimes poverty influenced Uyghur women to marry Chinese. These marriages were not recognized by local mullahs since Muslim women were not allowed to marry non-Muslim men under Islamic law. This did not stop the women because they enjoyed advantages, such as not being subject to certain taxes. Uyghur women married to the Chinese also did not have to wear a veil and they received their husband's property upon his death. These women were forbidden from being buried in Muslim graves. The children of Chinese men and Uyghur women were considered as Uyghur. Some Chinese soldiers had Uyghur women as temporary wives, and after the man's military service was up, the wife was left behind or sold, and if it was possible, sons were taken, and daughters were sold.

After the Russian Civil War, a huge number of Russians settled in the Manchuria region of China in the 1890s as colonists and marriages between Russian women and Han Chinese men started at the same time as the migration. The descendants of the interracial marriages are concentrated in the towns and villages of the frontier areas along the Ergun River of Inner Mongolia like Shiwei and Enhe. Interracial marriages between Chinese women and Russian men were rare, a marriage pattern that does not fit the European colonial convention of Western men marrying native women. Unions between Chinese and Russians were also rare in urban areas like Harbin where there was prejudice against mixed marriages on both sides.

One Chinese scholar Zhang Jingsheng wrote essays in 1924 and 1925 in various Chinese journals praising the advantages of miscegenation between Russians and Chinese, saying that interracial sex would promote greater understandings between the two peoples, and produce children with the best advantages of both peoples. Zhang argued that Russians were taller and had greater physical strength than the Han, but the Chinese were gentler and kinder than the Russians, and so intermarriage between the two peoples would ensure children with the advantages of both. Zhang wrote that the Russians were a tough "hard" people while the Chinese had a softer physique and more compassion, and miscegenation between the two would only benefit both. Zhang mentioned since 1918 about one million Russian women who had already married Chinese men and argued already the children born of these marriages had the strength and toughness of the Russians and the gentleness and kindness of the Chinese. Zhang wrote what he ultimately wanted was an "Asia for Asians", and believed his plans for miscegenation were the best way of achieving this. The South Korean historian Bong Inyoung wrote that Zhang's plans were based on a certain Social Darwinist thinking and a tendency to assign characteristics to various peoples in a way that might be considered objectionable today, but he was no racist as he did not see fair skin of the Russians as any reason why the Chinese should not marry them.

European travellers noted that many Han Chinese in Xinjiang married Uyghur (who were called turki) women and had children with them. A Chinese was spotted with a "young" and "good looking" Uyghur wife and another Chinese left behind his Uyghur wife and child in Khotan.

After 1950, some intermarriage between Han and Uyghur peoples continued. A Han married a Uyghur woman in 1966 and had three daughters with her, and other cases of intermarriage also continued.

Ever since the 1960s, African students were allowed by the Chinese government to study in China as friendly relations with Africans and African-related people was important to CCP's "Third World" coalition. Many African male students began to intermingle with the local Chinese women. Relationships between black men and Chinese women often led to numerous clashes between Chinese and African students in the 1980s as well as grounds for arrest and deportation of African students. The Nanjing anti-African protests of 1988 were triggered by confrontations between Chinese and Africans. New rules and regulations were made in order to stop African men from consorting with Chinese women. Two African men who were escorting Chinese women on a Christmas Eve party were stopped at the gate and along with several other factors escalated. The Nanjing protests lasted from Christmas Eve of 1988 to January 1989. Many new rules were set after the protests ended, including one where black men could only have one Chinese girlfriend at a time whose visits were limited to the lounge area.

There is a small but growing population of mixed marriages between male African (mostly Nigerian) traders and local Chinese women in the city of Guangzhou where it is estimated that in 2013 there are 400 African-Chinese families. The rise in mixed marriages has not been without controversy. The state, fearing fraud marriages, has strictly regulated matters. In order to obtain government-issued identification (which is required to attend school), the children must be registered under the Chinese mother's family name. Many African fathers, fearing that in doing so, they would relinquish their parental rights, have instead chosen to not send their children to school. There are efforts to open an African-Chinese school but it would first require government authorization.

=== Taiwan ===
During the Siege of Fort Zeelandia of 1661–1662 in which Chinese Ming loyalist forces commanded by Koxinga besieged and defeated the Dutch East India Company and conquered Taiwan, the Chinese took Dutch women and children prisoner. Koxinga took Hambroek's teenage daughter as a concubine, and Dutch women were sold to Chinese soldiers to become their wives. In 1684 some of these Dutch wives were still captives of the Chinese.

Some Dutch physical looks like auburn and red hair among people in regions of south Taiwan are a consequence of this episode of Dutch women becoming concubines to the Chinese commanders.

=== Hong Kong ===
Many Tanka women conceived children with foreign men. Ernest John Eitel mentioned in 1889 how an important change had taken place among Eurasian girls, the offspring of illicit connections: instead of becoming concubines, they were commonly brought up respectably and married to Hong Kong Chinese husbands. Many Hong Kong born Eurasians were assimilated into the Hong Kong society by intermarriage with the Cantonese population. A good example of a Cantonese Eurasian is Nancy Kwan, a Hollywood sex symbol. Kwan was of Eurasian origin, born in 1939 in Hong Kong to a father who was a Cantonese architect and mother who is a model of British descent. The martial artist Bruce Lee had a Cantonese father and a Eurasian mother.

Ernest John Eitel controversially claimed that most "half caste" people in Hong Kong were descended exclusively from Europeans having a relationship with Tanka women. The theory that most of the Eurasian mixed race Hong Kong people are descended only from Tanka women and European men, and not ordinary Cantonese women, has been backed up by other researchers who pointed out that Tanka women freely consorted with foreigners due to the fact that they were not bound by the same Confucian traditions as the Cantonese, and having a relationship with a European man was advantageous for Tanka women, but Lethbridge criticized it as "a 'myth' propagated by xenophobic Cantonese to account for the establishment of the Hong Kong Eurasian community". Carl Smith's study in the late 1960s on the protected women seems, to some degree, to support Ernest John Eitel's theory. Smith says that the Tankas experienced certain restrictions within the traditional Chinese social structure. Being a group marginal to the traditional Chinese society of the Puntis (Cantonese), they did not have the same social pressure in dealing with Europeans. The ordinary Cantonese women did not sleep with European men, thus the Eurasian population was formed mostly from Tanka and European admixture.

They invaded Hongkong the moment the settlement was started, living at first on boats in the harbour with their numerous families, gradually settling on shore. They have maintained ever since almost a monopoly of the supply of pilots and ships' crews, of the fish trade and the cattle trade, but unfortunately also of the trade in girls and women. Strange to say, when the settlement was first started, it was estimated that some 2,000 of these Tan-ka people had flocked to Hongkong, but at the present time they are about the same number, a tendency having set in among them to settle on shore rather than on the water and to disavow their Tan-ka extraction in order to mix on equal terms with the mass of the Chinese community. The half-caste population in Hongkong was, from the earliest days of the settlement of the Colony and down to the present day, almost exclusively the off-spring of these Tan-ka people. But, like the Tan-ka people themselves, they are happily under the influence of a process of continuous re-absorption into the mass of the Chinese residents of the Colony.

South Asians have been living in Hong Kong throughout the colonial period, before the independence in 1947 into the nations of India and Pakistan. They migrated to Hong Kong and worked as police officers as well as army officers during colonial rule. 25,000 of the Muslims in Hong Kong trace their roots back to what is now Pakistan. Around half of them belong to 'local boy' families, Muslims of mixed Chinese and South Asian ancestry, descended from early Indian/Pakistani Muslim immigrants who took local wives of Tanka origin and brought their children up as Muslims.

Elizabeth Wheeler Andrew (1845–1917) and Katharine Caroline Bushnell (5 February 1856 26 January 1946), who wrote extensively on the position of women in the British Empire, wrote about the Tanka inhabitants of Hong Kong and their position in the prostitution industry, catering to foreign sailors. The Tanka did not marry with the Chinese; being descendants of the natives, they were restricted to the waterways. They supplied their women as prostitutes to British sailors and assisted the British in their military actions around Hong Kong. The Tanka in Hong Kong were considered "outcasts", and categorized as low class. Tanka women were ostracized from the Cantonese community, and were nicknamed "salt water girls" (ham shui mui) for their services as prostitutes to foreigners in Hong Kong.

South Asians have been living in Hong Kong throughout the colonial period, before the Partition of India into the nations of India and Pakistan. They migrated to Hong Kong and worked as police officers as well as army officers during colonial rule. 25,000 of the Muslims in Hong Kong trace their roots back to Faisalabad in what is now Pakistan; around half of them belong to 'local boy' families, who descended from early Indian-Pakistani immigrants who took local wives mostly of Tanka origin.

=== Macau ===
The early Macanese ethnic group was formed from Portuguese men intermarrying with Malay, Japanese and Indian women. The Portuguese encouraged Chinese migration to Macao, and most Macanese in Macao were formed from intermarriages between Portuguese and Chinese. In 1810, the total population of Macao was about 4,033, of which 1,172 were white men, 1,830 were white women, 425 were male slaves, and 606 were female slaves. In 1830, the population increased to 4,480 and the breakdown was 1,202 white men, 2,149 white women, 350 male slaves, and 779 female slaves.

Rarely did Chinese women marry Portuguese; initially, mostly Goans, Ceylonese (from today's Sri Lanka), Indochinese, Malay, and Japanese women were the wives of the Portuguese men in Macau. Japanese girls would be purchased in Japan by Portuguese men. Many Chinese became Macanese simply by converting to Catholicism, and had no ancestry from Portuguese, having assimilated into the Macanese people. The majority of the early intermarriages of people from China with Portuguese were between Portuguese men and women of Tanka origin, who were considered the lowest class of people in China and had relations with Portuguese settlers and sailors. Western men were refused by high class Chinese women, who did not marry foreigners. In fact, in those days, the matrimonial context of production was usually constituted by Chinese women of low socio-economic status who were married to or concubines of Portuguese or Macanese men. Very rarely did Chinese women of higher status agree to marry a Westerner. As Deolinda argues in one of her short stories, "even should they have wanted to do so out of romantic infatuation, they would not be allowed to. Macanese men and women also married with the Portuguese and Chinese; as a result, some Macanese became indistinguishable from the Chinese or Portuguese population. Because the majority of the Chinese population who migrated to Macao was Cantonese, Macao became a Cantonese speaking society, and other ethnic groups became fluent in Cantonese. Most Macanese had paternal Portuguese heritage until 1974." It was in the 1980s that Macanese and Portuguese women began to marry men who defined themselves ethnically as Chinese, which resulted in many Macanese with Cantonese paternal ancestry.

Literature in Macao was written about love affairs and marriage between the Tanka women and Portuguese men, like "A-Chan, A Tancareira", by Henrique de Senna Fernandes.

After the handover of Macao to China in 1999 many Macanese migrated to other countries. Of the Portuguese and Macanese women who stayed in Macao, many married local Cantonese men, and so many Macanese also now have Cantonese paternal heritage. There are between 25,000 and 46,000 Macanese, but only 5,000–8,000 live in Macao, while most live in Latin America, the U.S., Portugal. Unlike the Macanese of Macao who are strictly of Chinese and Portuguese heritage, many Macanese living abroad have intermarried with the local population of the U.S. and Latin America and have only partial Macanese heritage.

== India ==
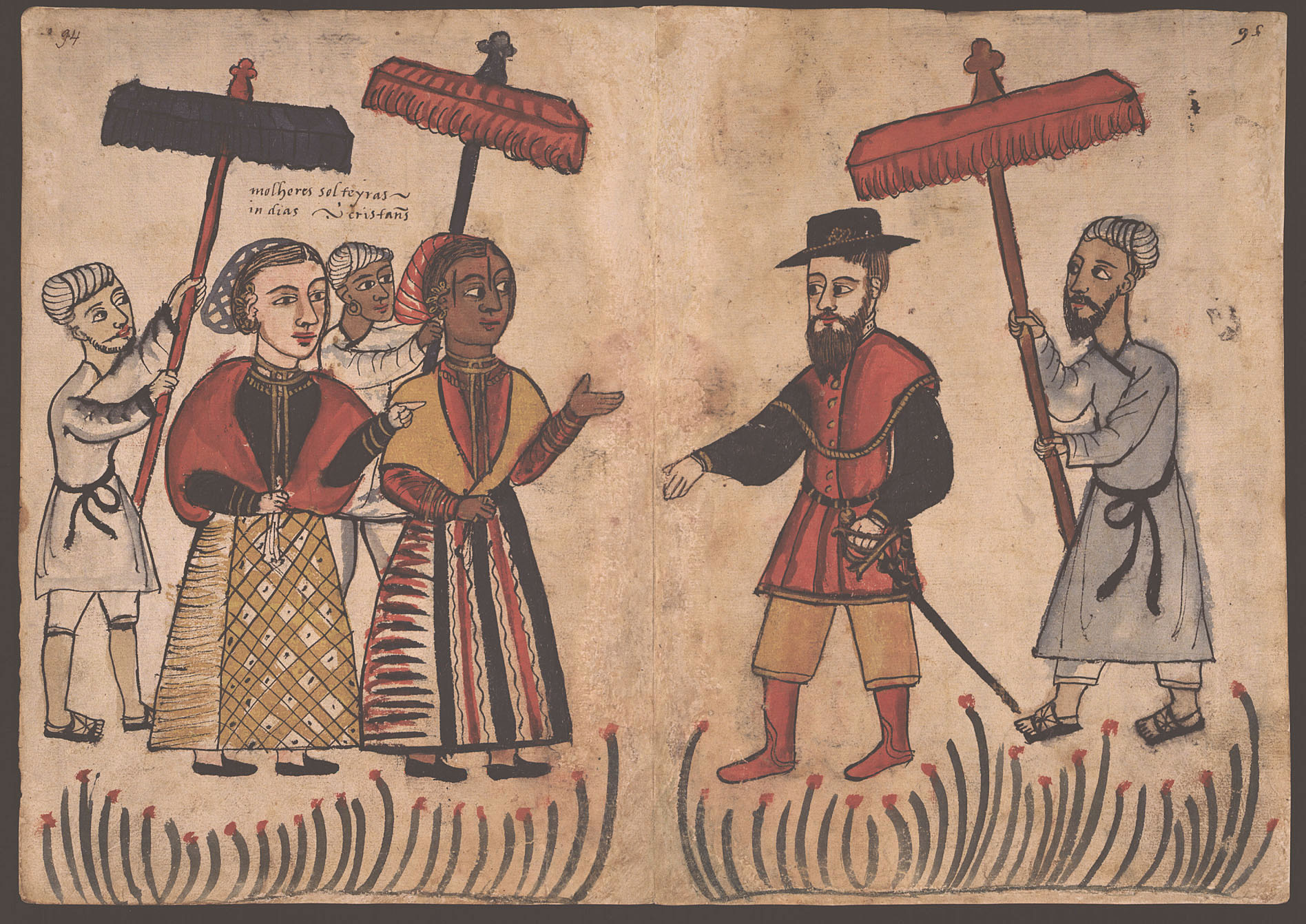
Christian maidens of Goa meeting a Portuguese nobleman seeking a wife, from the Códice Casanatense (c. 1540)

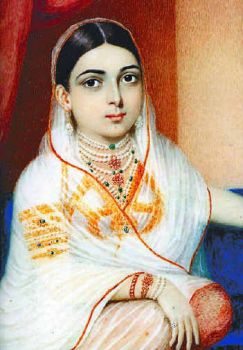
An oil painting of Khair-un-Nissa by George Chinnery. c. 1805. Begum Khair-un-Nissa was a Muslim Indian Hyderabadi noblewoman who fell in love and married the British Lieutenant Colonel James Achilles Kirkpatrick following his conversion to Islam.

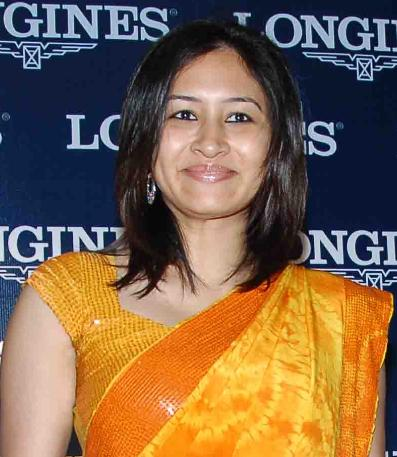
Jwala Gutta, Indian badminton player born to Indian father and Chinese mother often termed as Chindian

Although the Indian subcontinent is virtually endogamous with wedding practices in India overwhelmingly occurring within the same caste and religion, interracial relationships have occurred predating recorded history and have been historically recorded since antiquity. Inter-marriage in the Indian subcontinent has historically been applied between different ethnolinguistic groups, varna, caste, and religions. One of the critical aspects of inter-marriage in India is inter-caste marriage, which is based around the construct of caste.

Various groups of people have been intermarrying between ethnolinguistic groups for millennia in the Indian subcontinent, including speakers of the Dravidian, Indo-Aryan, Austroasiatic, and Tibeto-Burman languages. This has often formed syncretic languages and regional dialects.

Intermarriage rates in India varies greatly among the states and union territories of India. In modern India, intermarriage is most likely to occur involving spouse from the same socioeconomic strata.

Afonso de Albuquerque conquered Goa in 1510. He inaugurated the policy of Portuguese men marrying Indian women who had converted to Catholicism, the consequence of which was a great miscegenation in Goa and other Portuguese territories in Asia. During the late 16th century and 17th century, there was a community of over thousand Japanese slaves and traders in Goa, who were either Japanese Christians fleeing persecution in Japan, or young Japanese women and girls brought or captured as sexual slaves by Portuguese traders and their South Asian lascar crew members from Japan. In both cases, they often intermarried with the local population in Goa.

The Anglo-Indian community, with a population of 600,000, has been formed by British and Indian relationships, with significant amount of the diaspora living in Bangladesh, India, UK, Australia, and North America. Anglo-Indians in India are primarily found in West Bengal (including Kolkata), followed by Tamil Nadu and Kerala. Such syncretic relationships have had an influence on arts and culture. One example of an interracial liaison during colonial times involved Hyderabadi noblewoman Khair-un-Nissa and her relationship to Scottish official James Achilles Kirkpatrick.

As British women began arriving in India in large numbers around the early to mid-19th century, mostly as family members of officers and soldiers, British men became less likely to marry Indian women. Intermarriage declined after the events of the Rebellion of 1857, after which several anti-miscegenation laws were implemented.

The stereotype of the "Indian rapist" occurred frequently in English literature of the late 19th and early 20th centuries. This coincided with a period after the Indian Rebellion when the colonial government officially outlawed miscegenation, a decision which was influenced by the reports of rape supposedly committed by Indian rebels during the 1857 rebellion. These policies remained in effect until Indian independence in 1947.

The 1883 Ilbert Bill, which would have granted Indian judges the right to judge British offenders, was opposed by many Britons in India on the grounds that Indian judges could not be trusted in dealing with cases involving British females, with miscegenation and ethnic tensions playing a large part in opposition to the bill.

The stereotype of Indian males as rapists who targeted British women in India was critiqued by several novels such as E. M. Forster's A Passage to India (1924) and Paul Scott's The Jewel in the Crown (1966), both of which involve an Indian male being wrongly accused of raping a British female. Some activists argued that these stereotypes were wrong because Indians had proven to be more receptive to women's rights and progress, with the University of Calcutta becoming one of the first universities to admit female graduates to its degree programmes in 1878, before any of the universities in Britain did.

When Burma was ruled under the administration of British India, millions of Indians, mostly Muslims, migrated there. The small population of mixed descendants of Indian males and local Burmese females are called "Zerbadees", often in a pejorative sense implying mixed race.

In Assam, local Indians married several waves of Chinese migrants during the British colonial era, to the point where it became hard to physically differentiate Chinese in Assam from locals during the time of their internment during the 1962 war, and the majority of these Chinese in Assam were married to Indians, and some of these Indian women were deported to China with their husbands.

In the 19th century, when the British Straits Settlement shipped Chinese convicts to be jailed in India, the Chinese men then settled in the Nilgiri mountains near Naduvattam after their release and married Tamil Paraiyan women, having mixed Chinese-Tamil children with them. They were documented by Edgar Thurston. Paraiyan is also anglicized as "pariah".

Thurston described the colony of the Chinese men with their Tamil pariah wives and children: "Halting in the course of a recent anthropological expedition on the western side of the Nilgiri plateau, in the midst of the Government Cinchona plantations, I came across a small settlement of Chinese, who have squatted for some years on the slopes of the hills between Naduvatam and Gudalur, and developed, as the result of ' marriage ' with Tamil pariah women, into a colony, earning an honest livelihood by growing vegetables, cultivating coffee on a small scale, and adding to their income from these sources by the economic products of the cow. An ambassador was sent to this miniature Chinese Court with a suggestion that the men should, in return for monies, present themselves before me with a view to their measurements being recorded. The reply which came back was in its way racially characteristic as between Hindus and Chinese. In the case of the former, permission to make use of their bodies for the purposes of research depends essentially on a pecuniary transaction, on a scale varying from two to eight annas. The Chinese, on the other hand, though poor, sent a courteous message to the effect that they did not require payment in money, but would be perfectly happy if I would give them, as a memento, copies of their photographs." Thurston further describe a specific family: "The father was a typical Chinaman, whose only grievance was that, in the process of conversion to Christianity, he had been obliged to 'cut him tail off.' The mother was a typical Tamil Pariah of dusky hue. The colour of the children was more closely allied to the yellowish tint of the father than to the dark tint of the mother; and the semimongol parentage was betrayed in the slant eyes, flat nose, and (in one case) conspicuously prominent cheek-bones." Thurston's description of the Chinese-Tamil families were cited by others, one mentioned "an instance mating between a Chinese male with a Tamil Pariah female" A 1959 book described attempts made to find out what happened to the colony of mixed Chinese and Tamils.

== Sri Lanka ==
In Ceylon (present day Sri Lanka), interracial relationships between Dutch, British and Portuguese men and local women were common. The 65,000-strong Burgher community was formed by the interracial marriages of Dutch and Portuguese men with local Sinhalese and Tamil women. In addition to intermarriage, inter-ethnic prostitution in India was also fairly common at the time, when British officers would frequently visit Indian nautch dancers. In the mid-19th century, there were around 40,000 British soldiers but fewer than 2,000 British officials present in India. In the 19th century and early 20th century, women and girls from continental Europe were also trafficked into British India (and Ceylon), where they worked as prostitutes servicing both British soldiers and civilians.

== Japan ==
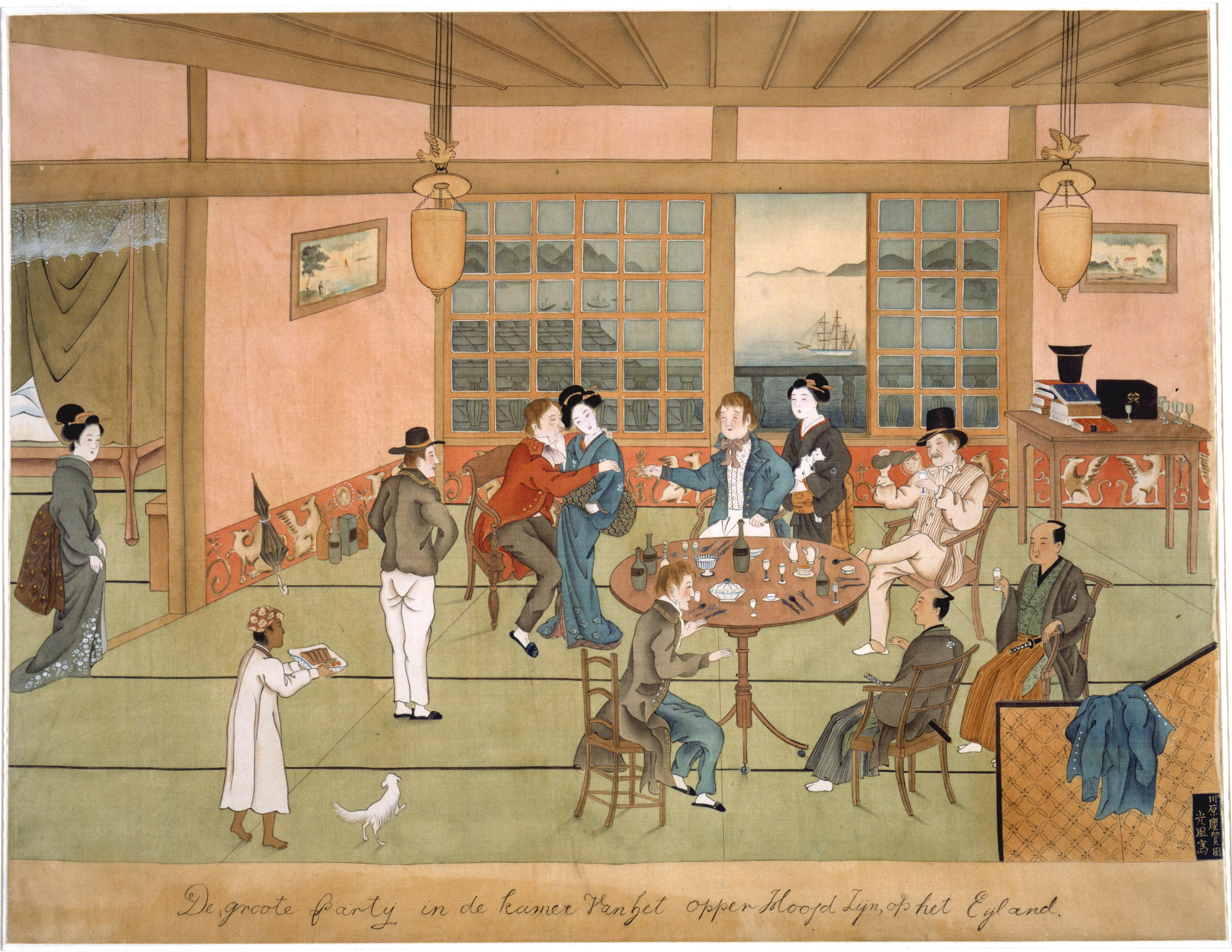
Europeans accompanied by Japanese courtesans in Dejima, the Dutch trading colony in the harbor of Nagasaki, early 19th century

Inter-ethnic marriage in Japan dates back to the 7th century, when Chinese and Korean immigrants began intermarrying with the local Japanese population. In the 1590s, over 50,000 Koreans were forcibly brought to Japan during Hideyoshi's invasions of Korea, where they intermarried with the local population. In the 16th and 17th centuries, around 58,000 Japanese travelled abroad, many of whom intermarried with the local women in Southeast Asia. During the anti-Christian persecutions in 1596, many Japanese Christians fled to Macau and other Portuguese colonies such as Goa, where there was a community of Japanese slaves and traders by the early 17th century. Intermarriage with the local populations in these Portuguese colonies also took place. Portuguese traders in Japan also intermarried with the local Christian women.

During the anti-Christian persecutions in 1596, many Japanese Christians fled to Macau and other Portuguese colonies such as Goa, where there was a community of Japanese slaves and traders by the early 17th century. The Japanese slaves were brought or captured by Portuguese traders from Japan. Intermarriage with the local populations in these Portuguese colonies also took place. Marriage and sexual relations between European merchants and Japanese women was usual during this period.

From the 15th century, Chinese, Korean and other Far Eastern visitors frequented brothels in Japan. This practice later continued among visitors from the "Western Regions", mainly European traders. This began with the arrival of Portuguese ships to Japan in the 16th century. Portuguese visitors and their South Asian (and sometimes African) crewmembers often engaged in slavery in Japan, where they bought Japanese slaves who were then taken to Macau and other Portuguese colonies in Southeast Asia, the Americas, and India. Later European East India companies, including those of the Dutch and British, also engaged in prostitution in Japan. Marriage and sexual relations between European merchants and Japanese women was usual during this period.

A large-scale slave trade developed in which Portuguese purchased Japanese as slaves in Japan and sold them to various locations overseas, including Portugal itself, throughout the sixteenth and seventeenth centuries. At least more than several hundreds of Japanese women, were sold sexual purposes. Many documents mention the large slave trade along with protests against the enslavement of Japanese. Although the actual number of slaves is debated, the proportions on the number of slaves tends to be exaggerated by the Japanese as part of anti-Portuguese propaganda. At least more than several hundreds of Japanese women were sold. A large slave trade developed in which Portuguese purchased hundreds of Japanese as slaves in Japan and sold them to various locations overseas, including Portugal itself, throughout the sixteenth and seventeenth centuries. Many documents mention the large slave trade along with protests against the enslavement of Japanese. Japanese slaves are believed to be the first of their nation to end up in Europe, and the Portuguese purchased large numbers of hundreds Japanese slave girls to bring to Portugal for sexual purposes, as noted by the Church in 1555. King Sebastian feared that it was having a negative effect on Catholic proselytization since the slave trade in Japanese was growing to massive proportions, so he commanded that it be banned in 1571.

Japanese slave women were even sold as concubines to black African crewmembers, along with their European counterparts serving on Portuguese ships trading in Japan, mentioned by Luis Cerqueira, a Portuguese Jesuit, in a 1598 document. Japanese slaves were brought by the Portuguese to Macau, where some of them not only ended up being enslaved to Portuguese, but as slaves to other slaves, with the Portuguese owning Malay and African slaves, who in turn owned Japanese slaves of their own.

Karayuki-san, literally meaning "Ms. Gone Abroad", were Japanese women who traveled to or were trafficked to East Asia, Southeast Asia, Manchuria, Siberia and as far as San Francisco in the second half of the 19th century and the first half of the 20th century to work as prostitutes, courtesans and geisha. In the 19th and early 20th centuries, there was a network of Japanese prostitutes being trafficked across Asia, in countries such as China, Japan, Korea, Singapore and British India, in what was then known as the 'Yellow Slave Traffic'.

In the early part of the Shōwa era, Japanese governments executed a eugenic policy to limit the birth of children with inferior traits, as well as aiming to protect the life and health of mothers. Family Center staff also attempted to discourage marriage between Japanese women and Korean men who had been recruited from the peninsula as laborers following its annexation by Japan in 1910. In 1942, a survey report argued that "the Korean laborers brought to Japan, where they have established permanent residency, are of the lower classes and therefore of inferior constitution ... By fathering children with Japanese women, these men could lower the caliber of the Yamato minzoku."

In 1928, journalist Shigenori Ikeda promoted 21 December as the blood-purity day (junketsu de) and sponsored free blood tests at the Tokyo Hygiene laboratory. By the early 1930s, detailed "eugenic marriage" questionnaires were printed or inserted in popular magazines for public consumption. Promoters like Ikeda were convinced that these marriage surveys would not only ensure the eugenic fitness of spouses but also help avoid class differences that could disrupt and even destroy marriage. The goal was to create a database of individuals and their entire households which would enable eugenicists to conduct in-depth surveys of any given family's genealogy.

Historian S. Kuznetsov, dean of the Department of History of the Irkutsk State University, one of the first researchers of the topic, interviewed thousands of former internees and came to the following conclusion: romantic relations between Japanese internees and Russian women were not uncommon. For example, in the city of Kansk, Krasnoyarsk Krai, about 50 Japanese married locals and stayed. Today many Russian women married Japanese men, often for the benefit of long-term residence and work rights. Some of their mixed offspring stay in Japan while others to Russia.

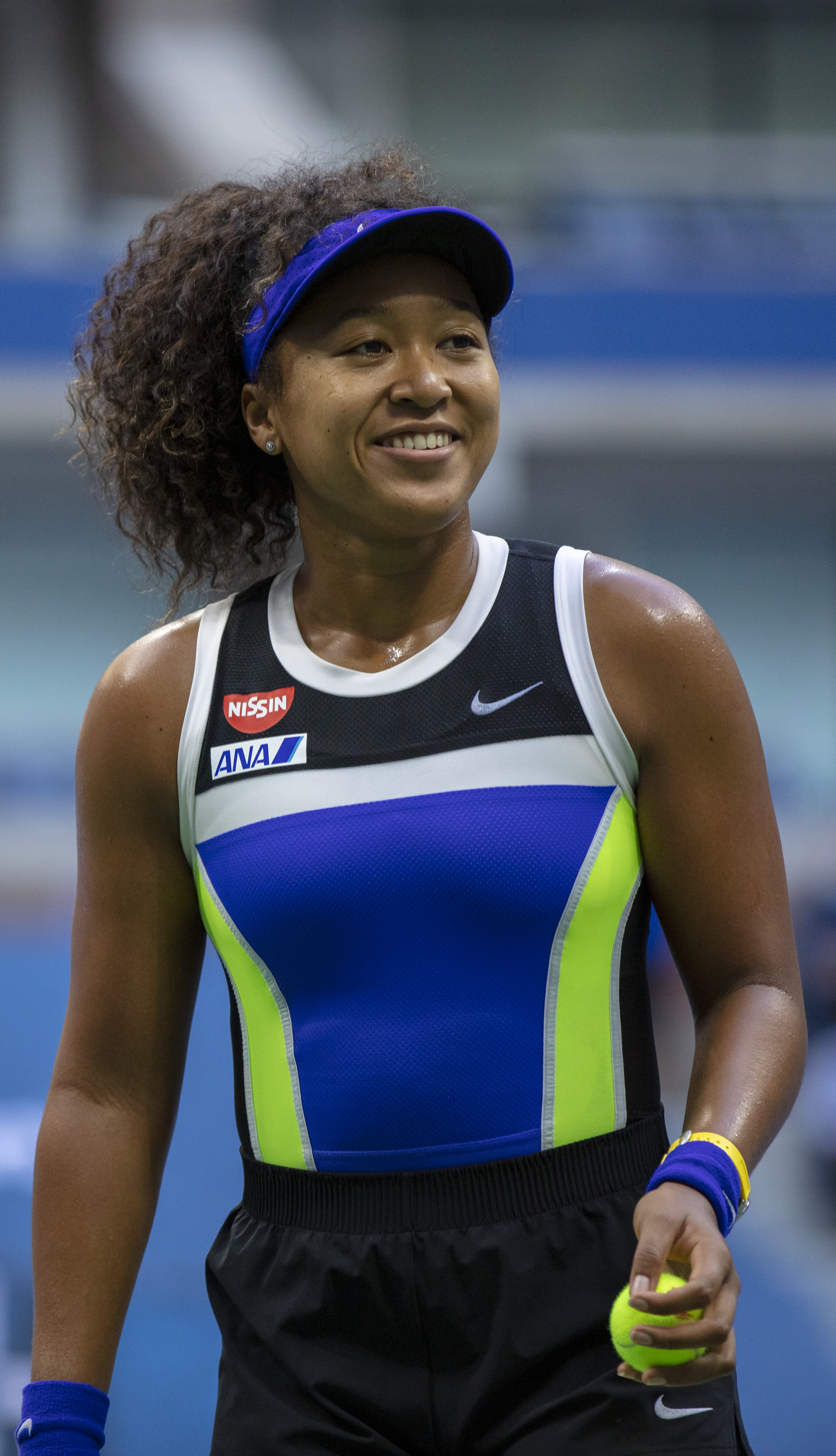
Naomi Osaka, tennis player (Haitian / Japanese)

One of the last eugenic measures of the Shōwa regime was taken by the Higashikuni government. On 19 August 1945, the Home Ministry ordered local government offices to establish a prostitution service for Allied soldiers to preserve the "purity" of the "Japanese race". The official declaration stated that: "Through the sacrifice of thousands of "Okichis" of the Shōwa era, we shall construct a dike to hold back the mad frenzy of the occupation troops and cultivate and preserve the purity of our race long into the future...."

Japanese society, with its ideology of homogeneity, has traditionally been intolerant of ethnic and other differences. Men or women of mixed ancestry, foreigners, and members of minority groups face discrimination in a variety of forms. In 2005, a United Nations report expressed concerns about racism in Japan and that government recognition of the depth of the problem was not realistic. In 2005, Japanese Minister Tarō Asō called Japan a "one-race" country.

In recent history, the hike in the African-Japanese population has been linked to the American occupation of Japan following the end of World War II, where African-Japanese children were born through either prostitution or legally binding marriage. Thus, over the years, an increased number of African-American male/Japanese female unions has produced a culturally mixed African-American and Japanese population living in Japan. These unions between Asian women and American G.I.s have also contributed to the increase of the Afro-Asian orphan population. In some cases Asian wives accompanied their husbands in returning to and settling in the United States. Subsequently, many African-Japanese are products of unions between Native Japanese and continental Africans due to the increased numbers of immigrant Africans.

The actual number of Japanese born to American soldiers is unknown. According to one estimate, around 5,000 to 10,000 throughout the whole occupation. Of those fathered by American soldiers. Their presumed "colors" were 86.1% "white," 11.5% "black" and 2.5% "unknown."

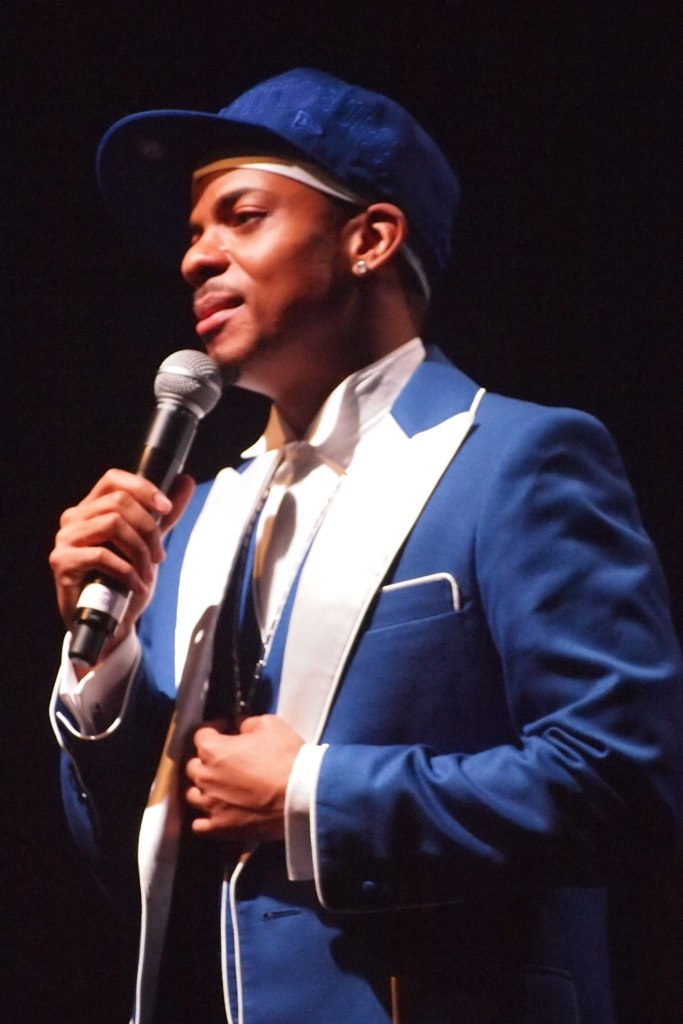
Afro-Japanese-American enka singer Jero

Notable African-Japanese include American author and playwright Velina Hasu Houston who was born in territorial waters off the coast of Japan to a native-born Japanese mother of partial Japanese ancestry and an African-American father. Popular American-born enka singer Jero was born into a multi-generational African-Japanese-American family and immigrated back to the birth country of his grandmother. He has become one of the most famous Black/African descendants in the country. There is also native-born wrestler Aja Kong, former professional basketball player Michael Takahashi and pop/R&B singer Thelma Aoyama who were all born to Japanese mothers and African-American fathers. Current Los Angeles Lakers forward Rui Hachimura was born to a Japanese mother and Beninese father. Sprinter Asuka Cambridge was born to a Japanese mother and a Jamaican father.

Other notable African descendants in Japanese media include singer Crystal Kay and beauty queen Ariana Miyamoto

In 2019, there were 599,007 marriages in Japan, of which 14,911 involved a non-Japanese bride and 7,008 involved a non-Japanese groom. Non-Japanese women who married a Japanese man were predominantly of Chinese (4,723), Filipino (3,666), Korean (1,678), Thai (986) and Brazilian (318) nationality. Non-Japanese men who married a Japanese woman were predominantly of Korean (1,764), United States (989), Chinese (917), Brazilian (332) nationality.

== Korea ==
Inter-ethnic marriage in Korea dates back to the arrival of Muslims in Korea during the Middle Ages, when Persian and Turkic navigators, traders and slaves settled in Korea and married local Korean people. Some assimilation into Buddhism and Shamanism eventually took place, owing to Korea's geographical isolation from the Muslim world.

There are several Korean clans that are descended from such intermarriages. For example, the Deoksu Jang clan, claiming some 30,000 Korean members, views Jang Sunnyong, a Central Asian who married a Korean female, as their ancestor. Another clan, Gyeongju Seol, claiming at least 2,000 members in Korea, view a Central Asian (probably a Uyghur) named Seol Son as their ancestor.

There are even cases of Korean kings marrying princesses from abroad. For example, the Korean text Samguk Yusa about the Gaya kingdom (it was absorbed by the kingdom of Silla later), indicate that in 48 AD, King Kim Suro of Gaya (the progenitor of the Gimhae Kim clan) took a princess (Princess Heo) from the "Ayuta nation" (which is the Korean name for the city of Ayodhya in North India) as his bride and queen. Princess Heo belonged to the Mishra royal family of Ayodhya. According to the Samguk Yusa, the princess had a dream about a heavenly fair handsome king from a far away land who was awaiting heaven's anointed ride. After Princess Heo had the dream, she asked her parents, the king and queen of Ayodhya, for permission to set out and seek the foreign prince, which the king and queen urged with the belief that God orchestrated the whole fate. That king was no other than King Kim Suro of the Korean Gaya kingdom.

6,423 Korean women married US military personnel as war brides during and immediately after the Korean War. The average number of Korean women marrying US military personnel each year was about 1,500 per year in the 1960s and 2,300 per year in the 1970s. Since the beginning of the Korean War in 1950, Korean women have immigrated to the United States as the wives of American soldiers. Based on extensive oral interviews and archival research, Beyond the Shadow of the Camptowns tells the stories of these women, from their presumed association with U.S. military camptowns and prostitution to their struggles within the intercultural families they create in the United States.

International marriages now make up 13% of all marriages in South Korea. Most of these marriages are unions between a Korean male and a foreign female usually from China, Japan, Vietnam, the Philippines, United States, Mongolia, Thailand, or Russia. On the other hand, Korean females have married foreign males from Japan, China, the United States, Bangladesh, Pakistan, Philippines, and Nepal. Between 1990 and 2005, there have been 159,942 Korean males and 80,813 Korean females married to foreigners.

South Korea is among the world's most ethnically homogeneous nations. Koreans have traditionally valued unmixed blood as the most important feature of Korean identity. The term "Kosian", referring to someone who has a Korean father and a non-Korean mother, is considered offensive by some who prefer to identify themselves or their children as Korean. Moreover, the Korean office of Amnesty International has claimed that the word "Kosian" represents racial discrimination. Kosian children, like those of other mixed-race backgrounds in Korea, often face discrimination.

== Malaysia and Singapore ==
In West Malaysia and Singapore, the majority of inter-ethnic marriages are between Chinese and Indians. The offspring of such marriages are informally known as "Chindian", although the Malaysian government only classifies them by their father's ethnicity. As the majority of these intermarriages usually involve an Indian groom and Chinese bride, the majority of Chindians in Malaysia are usually classified as "Indian" by the Malaysian government. As for the Malays, who are predominantly Muslim, legal restrictions in Malaysia make it uncommon for them to intermarry with either the Indians, who are predominantly Hindu, or the Chinese, who are predominantly Buddhist and Taoist. Non-Muslims are required to convert to Islam in order to marry Muslims. However, this has not entirely stopped intermarriage between the Malays and the Chinese and Indians. The Muslim Chinese community is small and has only a negligible impact on the socio-economy and demography of the region.

It is common for Arabs in Singapore and Malaysia to take local Malay and Jawi Peranakan wives, due to a common Islamic faith. The Chitty people, in Singapore and the Malacca state of Malaysia, are a Tamil people with considerable Malay descent, which was due to the first Tamil settlers taking local wives, since they did not bring along any of their own women with them. According to government statistics, the population of Singapore as of September 2007 was 4.68 million, of whom multiracial people, including Chindians and Eurasians, formed 2.4%.

In the East Malaysian states of Sabah and Sarawak, intermarriage is common between Chinese and native tribes such as the Murut and Dusun in Sabah, and the Iban and Bisaya in Sarawak. This has resulted in a potpourri of cultures in both states where many people claiming to be of native descent have some Chinese blood in them, and many Chinese have native blood in them. The offspring of these mixed marriages are called 'Sino-(name of tribe)', e.g. Sino-Dusun. Normally, if the father is Chinese, the offspring will adopt Chinese culture and if the father is native then native culture will be adopted, but this is not always the case. These Sino-natives are usually fluent in Malay and English. A smaller number are able to speak Chinese dialects and Mandarin, especially those who have received education in vernacular Chinese schools.

The Eurasians in West Malaysia and Singapore are descendants of Europeans and locals, mostly Portuguese or British colonial settlers who have taken local wives.

== Myanmar (Burma) ==
Burmese Muslims are the descendants of Bengalis, Indian Muslims, Arabs, Persians, Turks, Pathans, Chinese Muslims, and Malays who settled in Burma and married members of the local Burmese population as well as members of other Burmese ethnic groups such as the Rakhine, Shan, Karen, and Mon.

The oldest Muslim group in Burma (Myanmar) are the Rohingya people, who some believe are descended from Bengalis who settled in Burma and married native females in Rakhine State after the 7th century, but this is just a theory. When Burma was ruled by the British India administration, millions of Indians, mostly Muslims, migrated there. The small group of people who are the mixed descendants of Indian males and local Burmese females are called "Zerbadees", a term which is frequently used in a pejorative way in order to imply that they are people of mixed race. The Panthays, a group of Chinese Muslims descended from West Asians and Central Asians, migrated from China and also intermarried with local Burmese females.

In addition, Burma has an estimated 52,000 Anglo-Burmese people, descended from British and Burmese people. Anglo-Burmese people frequently intermarried with Anglo-Indian immigrants, who eventually assimilated into the Anglo-Burmese community.

The All India Digest stated that when a Chinese man wanted to marry a Burmese woman, he needed to prove that he previously adopted and was currently following the Burmese form of Buddhism because it was assumed that even though he was currently using a Burmese name, he was still practicing Chinese Buddhism. Since many Chinese in Burma gave themselves Burmese names but continued to practice Chinese Buddhism, the adoption of a Burmese name was not proof that he had adopted Burmese Buddhism, therefore, Chinese Buddhist customary law must be followed in such cases.

== Philippines ==
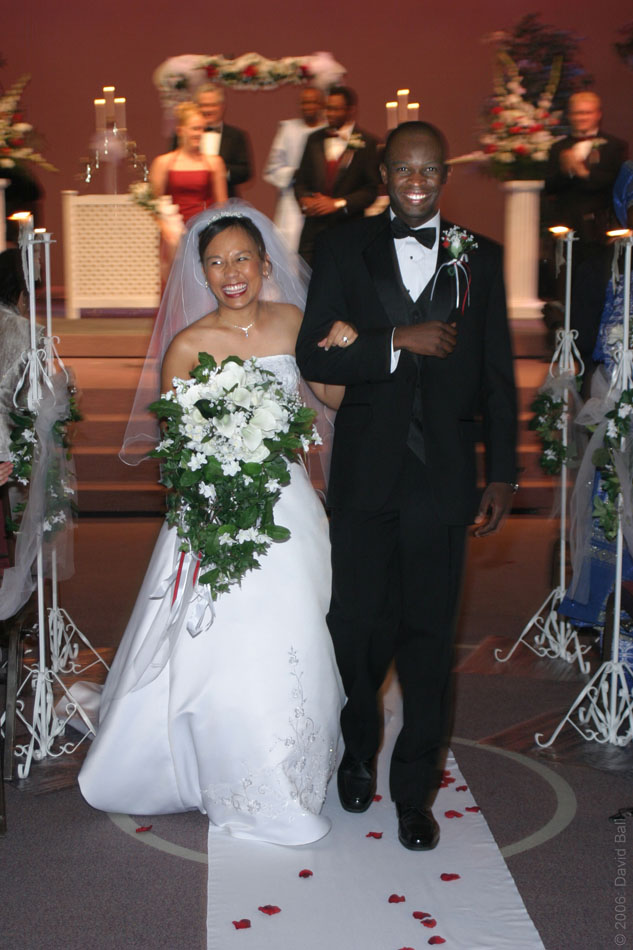
A Filipina bride and Nigerian groom walk down the aisle.

Historically, admixture has been an ever-present and pervasive phenomenon in the Philippines. The Philippines were originally settled by Australoid peoples who are called Negritos (different from other australoid groups) which now form the country's aboriginal community. Some admixture may have occurred between this earlier group and the mainstream Malayo-Polynesian population.

A considerable number of the population in the town of Cainta, Rizal, are descended from Indian soldiers who mutinied against the British Indian Army when the British briefly occupied the Philippines in 1762–63. These Indian soldiers, called Sepoy, settled in towns and intermarried with native women. Cainta residents of Indian descent are very visible today, particularly in Barrio Dayap near Brgy. Sto Niño.

There has been a Chinese presence in the Philippines since the 9th century. However, large-scale migrations of Chinese to the Philippines only started during the Spanish colonial era, when the world market was opened to the Philippines. It is estimated that among Filipinos, 10%–20% have some Chinese ancestry and 1.5% are "full-blooded" Chinese.

According to the American anthropologist H. Otley Beyer, the ancestry of Filipinos is 2% Arab. This dates back to when Arab traders intermarried with the local Malay Filipina female populations during the pre-Spanish history of the Philippines. Major Arab migration to the Philippines coincided with the spread of Islam in the region. Filipino-Muslim royal families from the Sultanate of Sulu and the Sultanate of Maguindanao claim Arab descent even going as far as claiming direct lineage from Muhammad. Such intermarriage mostly took place around the Mindanao island area, but the arrival of Spanish Conquistadors to the Philippines abruptly halted the spread of Islam further north into the Philippines. Intermarriage with Spanish people later became more prevalent after the Philippines was colonized by the Spanish Empire.

When the Spanish colonized the Philippines, a significant portion of the Filipino population mixed with the Spanish. When the United States took the Philippines from Spain during the Spanish–American War, much intermixing of Americans, both white and black, took place on the island of Luzon where the US had a Naval Base and Air Force Base, even after the United States gave the Philippines independence after World War II. First children and descendants of the male Filipino population with Spanish surnames who intermarried with the white American female population may be considered Spanish mestizos. The descendants of Filipinos and Europeans are today known as mestizos, following the term used in other former Spanish colonies.

Much mixing with the Japanese also took place due to the war rapes of Filipina women during World War II. Today there is an increasing number of Japanese men marrying Filipina women and fathering children by them whose family remains behind in the Philippines and are financially supported by their Japanese fathers who make regular visits to the Philippines. Today mixed-race marriages have a mixed perception in the Philippines. Most urban centers like Manila and Cebu are more willing to accept interracial marriages than rural areas.

== Vietnam ==
Much of the business conducted with foreign men in Southeast Asia was done by the local women, who engaged in both sexual and mercantile intercourse with foreign male traders. A Portuguese and Malay speaking Vietnamese woman who lived in Macao for an extensive period of time was the person who interpreted for the first diplomatic meeting between Cochin-China and a Dutch delegation, she served as an interpreter for three decades in the Cochin-China court with an old woman who had been married to three husbands, one Vietnamese and two Portuguese. The cosmopolitan exchange was facilitated by the marriage of Vietnamese women to Portuguese merchants. Those Vietnamese woman were married to Portuguese men and lived in Macao which was how they became fluent in Malay and Portuguese.

Alexander Hamilton said that "The Tonquiners used to be very desirous of having a brood of Europeans in their country, for which reason the greatest nobles thought it no shame or disgrace to marry their daughters to English and Dutch seamen, for the time they were to stay in Tonquin, and often presented their sons-in-law pretty handsomely at their departure, especially if they left their wives with child; but adultery was dangerous to the husband, for they are well versed in the art of poisoning."

The American soldiers in Vietnam during the Vietnam War entered into sexual relationships with native Vietnamese women. Many of the women were workers in nightclubs, brothels and pubs. The American Embassy once reported there were fewer than 1,000 Amerasians. A report by the South Vietnamese Senate Subcommittee suggested there are 15,000 to 20,000 children of mixed European American and Vietnamese ancestry, but this figure was considered low. Congress estimated 20,000 to 30,000 Amerasians by 1975 lived in Vietnam. According to Amerasians Without Borders, they estimated about 25,000 to 30,000 Vietnamese Amerasians were born from American first participation in Vietnam in 1962 and lasted until 1975.
