= Ergun City =

Ergun 额尔古纳市 • ᠡᠷᠬᠥᠨ᠎ᠠ ᠬᠣᠲᠠ
- County-level city
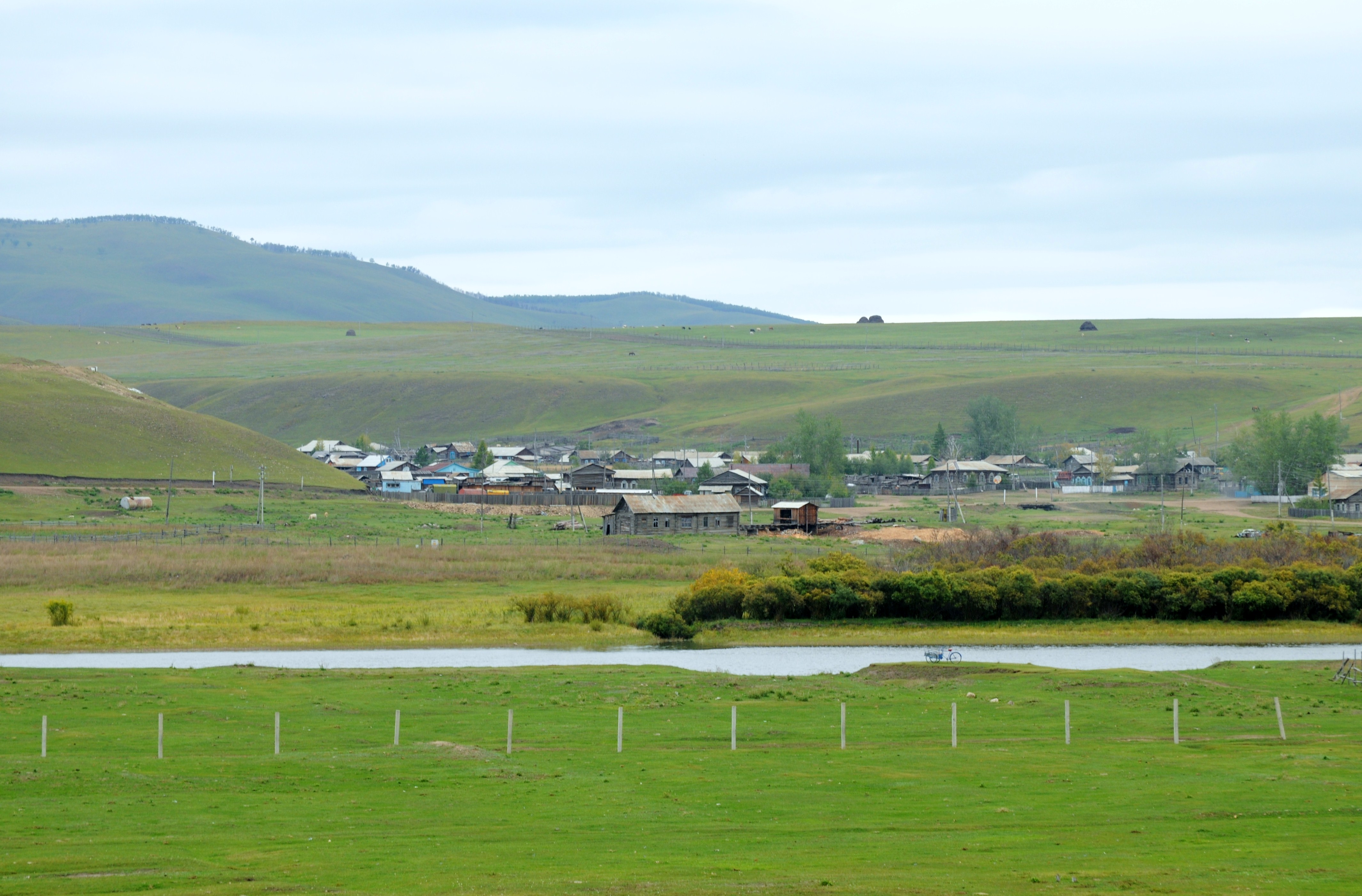
- Village on the Argun River

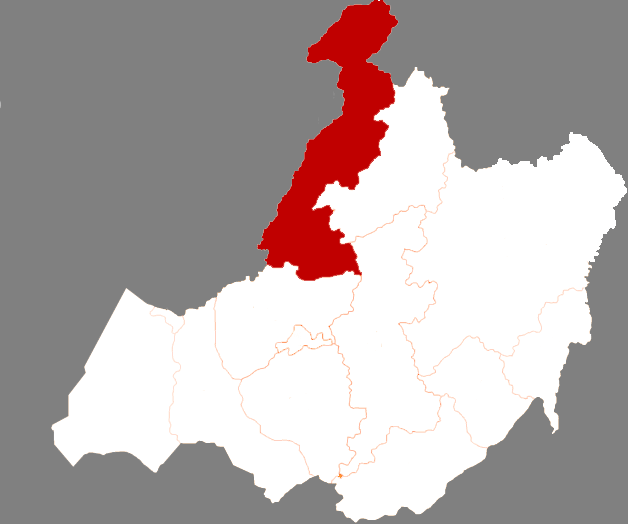
- Ergun in Hulunbuir

- Location in Inner Mongolia Ergun (China)
- Coordinates: 50°14′35″N 120°10′52″E
- Country: China
- Autonomous region: Inner Mongolia
- Prefecture-level city: Hulunbuir
- Municipal seat: Labdalin Subdistrict

Area
  - County-level city: 28,400 km^{2} (11,000 sq mi)
  - Urban: 303.00 km^{2} (116.99 sq mi)

Population (2020)
  - County-level city: 68,482
  - Density: 2.41/km^{2} (6.25/sq mi)
  - Urban: 38,100
- Time zone: UTC+8 (China Standard)
- Postal code: 022050
- Area code: 0470
- Website: www.eegn.gov.cn

Ergun City

Chinese name
- Simplified Chinese: 额尔古纳市
- Traditional Chinese: 額爾古納市
Transcriptions
Standard Mandarin
- Hanyu Pinyin: É'ěrgǔnà Shì

Former name
- Simplified Chinese: 额尔古纳右旗
- Traditional Chinese: 額爾古納右旗
Transcriptions
Standard Mandarin
- Hanyu Pinyin: É'ěrgǔnà Yòu Qí

Mongolian name
- Mongolian Cyrillic: Эргүнэ хот
- Mongolian script: ᠡᠷᠬᠥᠨ᠎ᠠ ᠬᠣᠲᠠ
Transcriptions
- SASM/GNC: Ergün-e qota

Russian name
- Russian: Аргунь

Ergun (Chinese: 额尔古纳市; Mongolian: ᠡᠷᠬᠥᠨ᠎ᠠ ᠬᠣᠲᠠ), formerly Ergun Right Banner (Chinese: 额尔古纳右旗), is a county-level city in Hulunbuir, Inner Mongolia, containing the autonomous region's northernmost point. The city has an area of 28,958 square kilometres (11,181 mi^{2}), and a population of 79,155 as of 2019.

== History ==
For most of its history, the region of present-day Ergun has been governed by ethnic minority regimes. The area first came under Chinese control during the Qing dynasty, when it was administered as part of Hulunbuir.

In 1908, the Jilalin Administrative Bureau (Chinese: 吉拉林设治局; pinyin: Jílālín Shèzhì Jú) was established to govern the area.

In 1920, the area was re-organized as the Qiqan Administrative Bureau (Chinese: 奇乾设治局; pinyin: Qíqián Shèzhì Jú), but the area was re-organized again in 1921 as Qiqan County (Chinese: 奇乾县; pinyin: Qíqián Xiàn).

In 1933, the area was re-organized as Ergun Right Banner (Chinese: 额尔古纳右旗; pinyin: É'ěrgǔnà Yòu Qí). From 1948 to 1966, Ergun Right Banner was merged with Ergun Left Banner, which occupied present-day Genhe, as Ergun Left Banner. In 1994, Ergun Right Banner was abolished and the county-level city of Ergun was established.

=== 21st century ===
By 2000, the city administered five towns, one township, and two ethnic townships. In 2001, the city was restructured to administer one subdistrict, two towns, one township, and two ethnic townships.

In 2006, Xincheng Subdistrict (Chinese: 新城街道; pinyin: Xīnchéng Jiēdào) was renamed to Labdalin Subdistrict, and Shangkuli Township (Chinese: 上库力乡; pinyin: Shàngkùlì Xiāng) was upgraded to Shangkuli Subdistrict.

In 2011, Shiwei Russian Ethnic Township (Chinese: 室韦俄罗斯族民族乡; pinyin: Shìwéi Èluósī Zú Mínzú Xiāng) was abolished and Enhe Russian Ethnic Township and Mengwu Shiwei Sum were established. Engh Had was also established.

In 2013, Qiqan Township was established.

== Geography ==
Administratively, Ergun is part of the prefecture-level city of Hulunbuir, and spans 11.4% of Hulunbuir's area. It occupies 28,958 square kilometres (11,181 mi^{2}), bounded to the north and west by the Argun River, which forms China's border with Russia's Zabaykalsky Krai (formerly, Chita Oblast). The city's border with Russia spans 675 kilometres (419 mi). Ergun is also bordered by Genhe to the east, and the county-level city of Mohe in Heilongjiang to the northeast.

The city stands at the foothills of the Greater Khingan Mountains. 73.4% of the city's area is forested, with much of it being virgin forests. 17% of the city's area is natural grassland, particularly in the city's south, and 6% is cultivated.

Apart from the Argun River, major rivers in the city include the Delbur River, the Gen River, the Hawu'er River, the Jiliu River, the Wuma River, and the Engh Had River, all of which are tributaries of the Argun River.

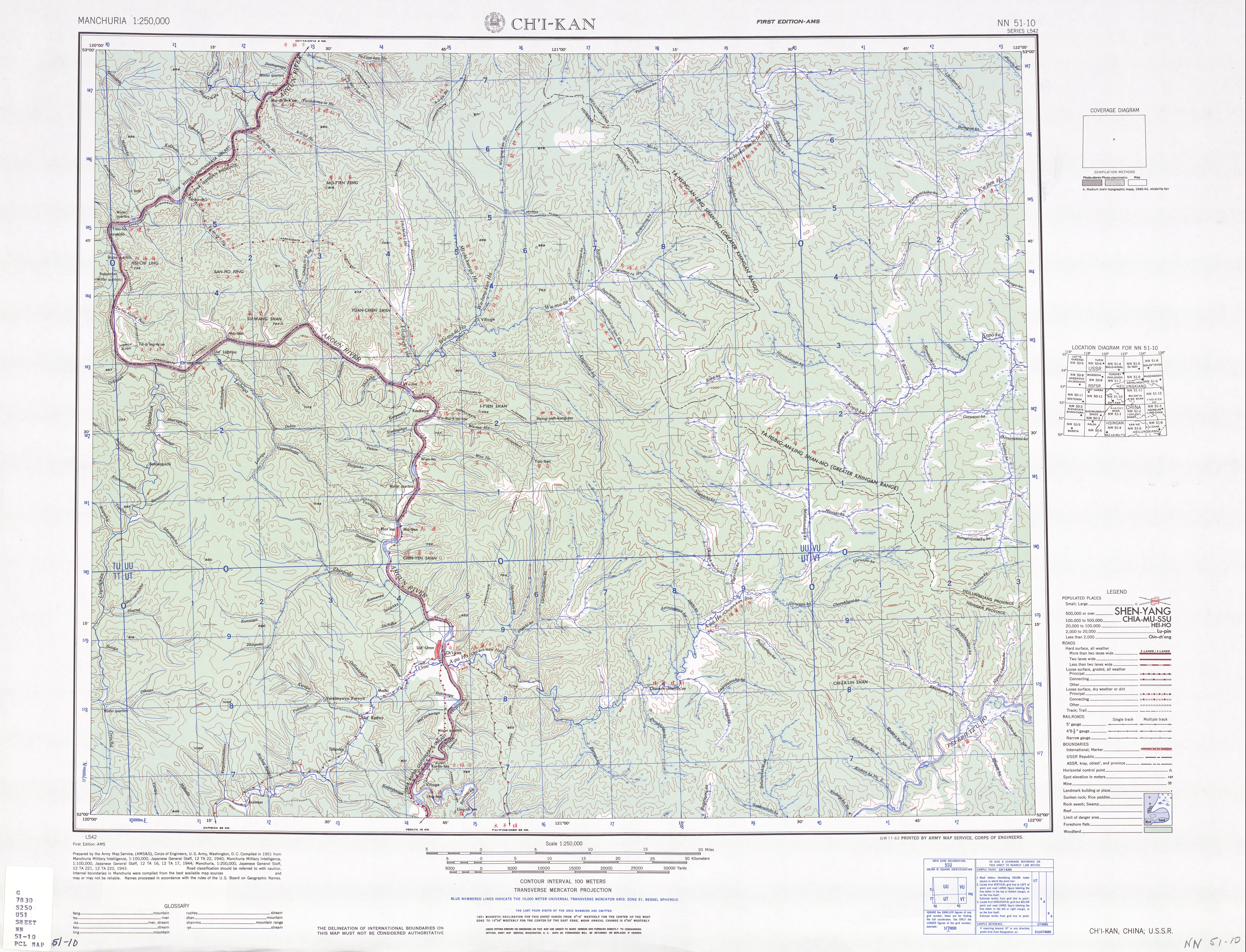
Jiqian (labelled as Ch'i-kan 奇乾) (1951)

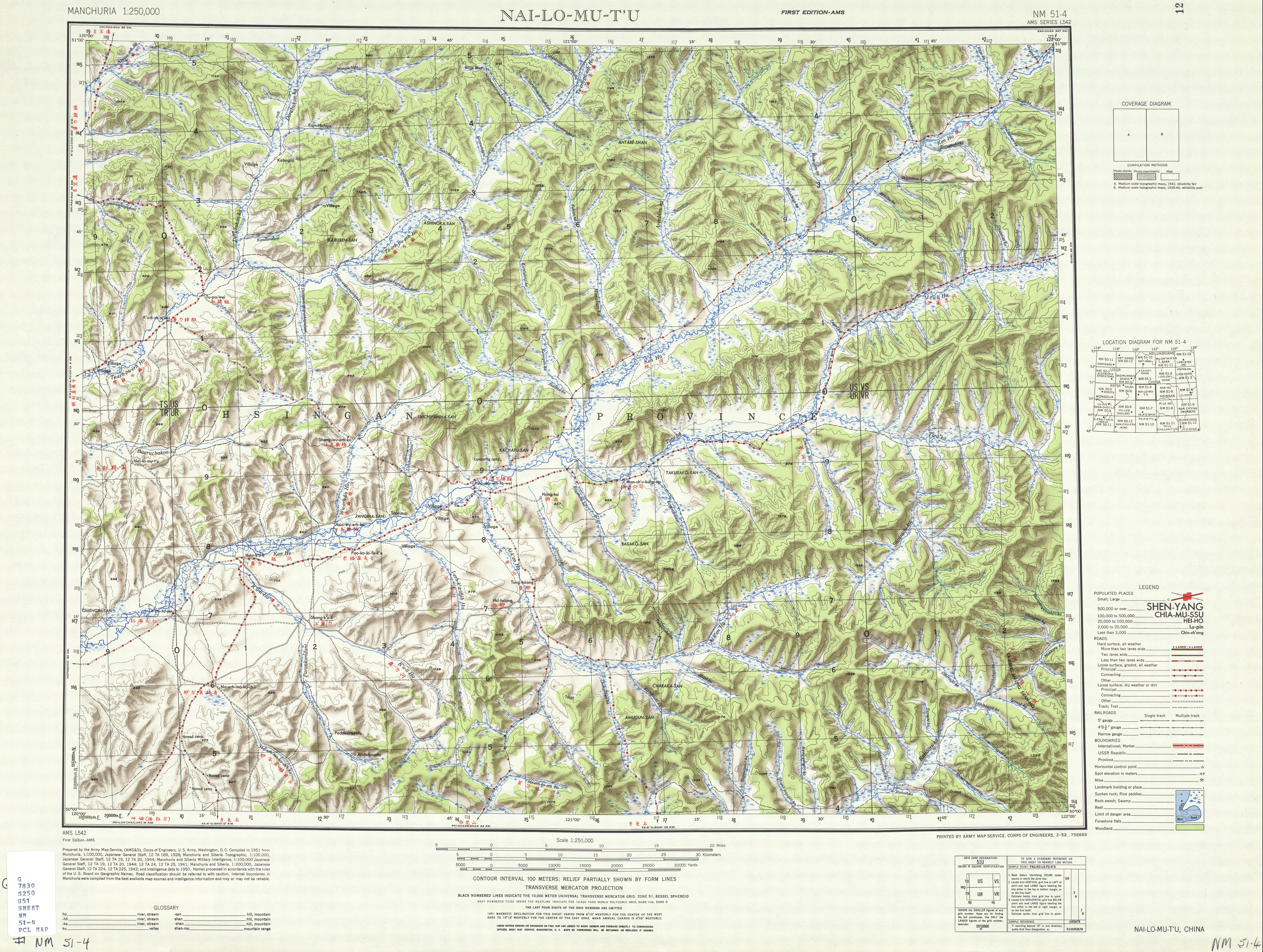
Map including part of Ergun (AMS, 1951)

=== Ergun Wetlands ===
The city hosts Ergun Wetlands (formerly known as the Genhe Wetlands), a plain delta formed by the Argun River, the Gen River, the Delbur River, and the Hawu'er River. The Ergun Wetlands is one of the largest wetlands in Asia, lying about 3 km to the west of Labdalin Subdistrict, Ergun's urban area and seat of government.

After the end of September the wetlands wither and turn dark. A panoramic view of the wetlands is afforded from a tourist scenic view overlooking the area from a hill 720 meters above sea level.

The encroachment of urban development has made preservation of the wetland difficult but were bolstered by a wetland protection law in 2012.

=== Climate ===
The city experiences an average annual temperature of −3.1 °C (26.4 °F), and an average annual precipitation of 375 millimetres (14.8 in).

Climate data for Ergun, elevation 581 m (1,906 ft), (1991–2020 normals, extremes 1981–2010)
Month	Jan	Feb	Mar	Apr	May	Jun	Jul	Aug	Sep	Oct	Nov	Dec	Year
Record high °C (°F)	−2.1 (28.2)	2.4 (36.3)	17.1 (62.8)	28.4 (83.1)	35.2 (95.4)	39.0 (102.2)	37.9 (100.2)	35.2 (95.4)	33.4 (92.1)	26.0 (78.8)	11.8 (53.2)	−1.0 (30.2)	39.0 (102.2)
Mean daily maximum °C (°F)	−22.0 (−7.6)	−15.2 (4.6)	−3.9 (25.0)	9.7 (49.5)	19.0 (66.2)	24.9 (76.8)	26.5 (79.7)	24.4 (75.9)	18.0 (64.4)	7.5 (45.5)	−7.7 (18.1)	−19.8 (−3.6)	5.1 (41.2)
Daily mean °C (°F)	−28.0 (−18.4)	−22.7 (−8.9)	−11.1 (12.0)	2.7 (36.9)	11.7 (53.1)	18.0 (64.4)	20.3 (68.5)	17.8 (64.0)	10.4 (50.7)	0.4 (32.7)	−13.8 (7.2)	−25.1 (−13.2)	−1.6 (29.1)
Mean daily minimum °C (°F)	−32.7 (−26.9)	−28.7 (−19.7)	−18.1 (−0.6)	−4.1 (24.6)	3.9 (39.0)	10.6 (51.1)	14.2 (57.6)	11.7 (53.1)	3.9 (39.0)	−5.4 (22.3)	−18.9 (−2.0)	−29.6 (−21.3)	−7.8 (18.0)
Record low °C (°F)	−45.4 (−49.7)	−44.0 (−47.2)	−36.7 (−34.1)	−20.5 (−4.9)	−10.7 (12.7)	−0.8 (30.6)	3.5 (38.3)	−0.2 (31.6)	−10.3 (13.5)	−21.1 (−6.0)	−41.3 (−42.3)	−44.5 (−48.1)	−45.4 (−49.7)
Average precipitation mm (inches)	4.8 (0.19)	3.3 (0.13)	5.5 (0.22)	12.4 (0.49)	23.9 (0.94)	55.1 (2.17)	98.7 (3.89)	84.4 (3.32)	33.5 (1.32)	16.1 (0.63)	7.2 (0.28)	6.4 (0.25)	351.3 (13.83)
Average precipitation days (≥ 0.1 mm)	9.1	5.5	5.0	6.1	7.7	11.4	14.8	12.8	9.4	6.4	8.2	10.9	107.3
Average snowy days	11.4	8.0	7.6	6.3	1.6	0.1	0	0	0.7	5.6	11.3	14.1	66.7
Average relative humidity (%)	72	71	65	50	45	59	69	71	64	61	72	74	64
Mean monthly sunshine hours	164.9	207.5	273.1	260.3	273.1	275.9	251.2	244.0	221.7	208.0	165.0	136.1	2,680.8
Percentage possible sunshine	62	72	73	62	57	56	51	55	60	64	62	55	61
Source: China Meteorological Administration

== Administrative divisions ==
Ergun is divided into 2 subdistricts, 3 towns, 1 township, 2 ethnic townships and 1 sum. The city's seat of government is located in Labdalin Subdistrict.

Name	Simplified Chinese	Hanyu Pinyin	Mongolian (Hudum Script)	Mongolian (Cyrillic)	Population (2010)	Notes
Subdistricts
Labdalin Subdistrict	拉布大林街道	Lābùdàlín Jiēdào	ᠯᠠᠪᠳᠠᠯᠢᠨ ᠵᠡᠭᠡᠯᠢ ᠭᠤᠳᠤᠮᠵᠢ	Лавталин зээл гудамж	35,727	
Shangkuli Subdistrict	上库力街道	Shàngkùlì Jiēdào	ᠱᠠᠩ ᠺᠦ᠋ ᠯᠢ ᠵᠡᠭᠡᠯᠢ ᠭᠤᠳᠤᠮᠵᠢ	Шан кү ли зээл гудамж	6,708	
Towns
Heishantou	黑山头镇	Hēishāntóu Zhèn	ᠾᠧᠢ ᠱᠠᠨ ᠲᠧᠦ ᠪᠠᠯᠭᠠᠰᠤ	Гей шин дүү балгас	2,029	
Moridaga	莫尔道嘎镇	Mò'ěrdàogā Zhèn	ᠮᠣᠷᠢᠳᠠᠭ᠎ᠠ ᠪᠠᠯᠭᠠᠰᠤ	Мордоо балгас	17,970	
Engh Had	恩和哈达镇	Ēnhéhādá Zhèn	ᠡᠩᠬᠡ ᠬᠠᠳᠠ ᠪᠠᠯᠭᠠᠰᠤ	Энх хад балгас	N/A	
Township
Qiqian Township	奇乾乡	Qíqián Xiāng	ᠴᠢᠴᠠᠨ ᠰᠢᠶᠠᠩ	Чичан шиян	N/A	
Ethnic township
Sanhe Hui Ethnic Township	三河回族乡	Sānhé Huízú Xiāng	ᠰᠠᠨ ᠾᠧ ᠬᠣᠲᠣᠩ ᠦᠨᠳᠦᠰᠦᠲᠡᠨ ᠤ ᠰᠢᠶᠠᠩ	Сан ге хотон үндэстэний шиян	10,648	
Enhe Russian Ethnic Township	恩和俄罗斯族民族乡	Ēnhé Èluósīzú Mínzúxiāng	ᠡᠩᠬᠡ ᠣᠷᠣᠰ ᠦᠨᠳᠦᠰᠦᠲᠡᠨ ᠦ ᠰᠢᠶᠠᠩ	Энх огус үндэстэний шиян	N/A	(Russian); Эньхэ-Русская национальная волость
Sum
Mengwu Xiboge Sum	蒙兀室韦苏木	Méngwùshìwéi Sūmù	ᠮᠣᠩᠭᠣᠯ ᠰᠢᠭᠤᠢ ᠰᠤᠮᠤ	Монгол шугуй сум	N/A	
Other Township-level Divisions
Inner Mongolia Labdalin Ranch	内蒙古拉布大林农牧场	Nèi Ménggǔ Lābùdàlín Nóngmùchǎng			N/A	
Inner Mongolia Sanhe Stallion Ranch	内蒙古三河种马场	Nèi Ménggǔ Sānhé Zhǒngmǎchǎng				
Inner Mongolia Shangkuli Farm	内蒙古上库力农场	Nèi Ménggǔ Shàngkùlì Nóngchǎng				
Inner Mongolia Suqin Ranch	内蒙古苏沁农牧场	Nèi Ménggǔ Sūqìn Nóngmùchǎng				

== Demographics ==
Ergun is one of the least populated county-level divisions of Inner Mongolia, with a population of 79,155 as of 2019, making it the 87th most populated of the autonomous region's 103 divisions. This figure reflects a 1.0% decline from the 2018 population of 79,942. As of 2010, Ergun had a population of 76,667.

=== Ethnicity ===
Ergun City Ethnic Composition
Ethnic group	2000		2006		2018	
Ethnic group	Number	Percentage	Number	Percentage	Number	Percentage
Han Chinese	62,224	77.43%	64,591	75.84%	58,778	73.53%
Mongol	4,839	6.02%	7,294	8.56%	7,897	9.88%
Hui	6,616	8.23%	N/A	N/A	6,583	8.23%
Russian	2,713	3.38%	2,468	2.90%	2,613	3.27%
Manchu	2,713	3.38%	N/A	N/A	N/A	N/A
Daur	763	0.95%	N/A	N/A	N/A	N/A
Korean	182	0.23%	N/A	N/A	N/A	N/A
Evenk	156	0.19%	N/A	N/A	N/A	N/A
Oroqen	63	0.08%	N/A	N/A	N/A	N/A
Miao	55	0.07%	N/A	N/A	N/A	N/A
Tujia	29	0.04%	N/A	N/A	N/A	N/A
Sibe	3	<0.01%	N/A	N/A	N/A	N/A
Yi	2	<0.01%	N/A	N/A	N/A	N/A
Other	0	0.00%	10,809	12.69%	4,071	5.09%
Total	80,358	100.00%	85,162	100.00%	79,942	100.00%

In Ergun's towns and villages along the Argun River are thousands of descendants of intermarriages between Han Chinese men and Russian women. This Russian descended population forms a large portion of the total number of Russians in China. One of these locations is Enhe Russian Ethnic Township, the sole official ethnic Russian township.

== Economy ==
Ergun's gross domestic product was ¥4.059 billion as of 2019, and ¥4.519 billion as of 2018. As of 2018, 42.1% of the city's gross domestic product came from its primary sector, 11.1% came from its secondary sector, and 46.8% came from its tertiary sector. The city's public budget revenue in 2019 was ¥150.55 million, ranking 91st out of Inner Mongolia's 103 county-level divisions. Its consumer retail sales totaled ¥1.826 billion, and its foreign trade totaled 56.32 million USD.

Ergun City Economic Composition
Sector	2018		2019	
Sector	Total (RMB)	Percent of whole	Total (RMB)	Percent of whole
Primary	1.902 billion	42.09%	1.70576 billion	42.02%
Secondary	0.502 billion	11.11%	0.45242 billion	11.14%
Tertiary	2.115 billion	46.80%	1.90133 billion	46.84%
Total	4.519 billion	100.00%	4.05951 billion	100.00%

The average household disposable income of Ergun's residents totaled ¥30,371 in 2019, a 7.8% increase from the ¥28,173 reported in 2018. For urban households, this number stood at ¥30,953 in 2019, a 7.0% increase from the ¥28,928 reported in 2018, which ranked 75th of the 101 county-level divisions in Inner Mongolia for which this statistic was reported. Rural households in Ergun average ¥28,470 in disposable income as of 2019, a 10.0% increase from 2018, which ranked the 3rd highest of the 90 county-level divisions in Inner Mongolia which reported this statistic.

As of 2019, there are 99,140 mobile telephone subscriptions in Ergun (1.25 per capita), and 28,962 internet subscriptions (0.37 per capita).

Mineral deposits in Ergun include coal, gold, lead, zinc, iron, tungsten, copper, and fluorite.

=== Agriculture ===
The total value of Ergun's agriculture, forestry, animal husbandry, and aquaculture industry as of 2018 was ¥3.072 billion.

In 2019, Ergun produced 263,482 tons of grain, the 37th most of the 96 county-level divisions of Inner Mongolia which reported this statistic. The city produced 9,255 tons of meat the same year, ranking 74th of Inner Mongolia's 103 county-level divisions.

=== Tourism ===
Ergun has a significant tourism industry, attracting 5.733 million tourists in 2019 alone.

The Ergun Wetland Scenic Area (Chinese: 额尔古纳湿地景区) is designated as a AAAA Tourist Attraction.

Enhe Russian Ethnic Township has become a major tourist destination in recent years, attracting about 500,000 tourists in 2017 alone. Much of the town's tourism is derived from its small rural character, as well as its unique intersection of Russian and Chinese culture. Due to the cold climate of the region, most of the ethnic township's tourism takes place in summer months.

Ergun also hosts the ancient ruins of the city of Heishantou and portions of the Great Wall of Jin.

== Education ==
As of 2019, the city has 10 primary schools and 5 secondary schools.

Secondary schools include:

- Ergun City No. 2 Secondary School (额尔古纳市第二中学)
- Ergun City No. 3 Secondary School (额尔古纳市第三中学)
- Ergun City Moridaga Secondary School (额尔古纳市莫尔道嘎中学)
- Ergun City Sanhe Secondary School (额尔古纳市三河中学)

Primary schools include:

- Ergun City No. 1 Primary School (额尔古纳市第一小学)
- Ergun City No. 2 Primary School (额尔古纳市第二小学)
- Ergun City No. 3 Primary School (额尔古纳市第三小学)
- Ergun City Enhe Primary School (额尔古纳市恩和小学)
- Ergun City Heishantou Primary School (额尔古纳市黑山头小学)
- Ergun City Moridaga Primary School 1 (额尔古纳市莫尔道嘎一小)
- Ergun City Sanhe Primary School (额尔古纳市三河小学)
- Ergun City Shangkuli Primary School (额尔古纳市上库力小学)
- Ergun City Shiwei Primary School (额尔古纳市室韦小学)
- Ergun City Suqin Primary School (额尔古纳市苏沁小学)

== Healthcare ==
As of 2019, Ergun's medical institutions have 414 beds, and are staffed by 597 personnel.

== Transportation ==
Ergun hosts 2,430 kilometres (1,510 mi) of highway as of 2019. Inner Mongolia Provincial Highway 201 and Inner Mongolia Provincial Highway 301 both run through Ergun.

Ergun has two international border crossings: one in Shiwei, and another in Heishantou.
