= Prostitution in Vietnam =

Sex workers weaving in a re-education center in Ho Chi Minh City, 1980

Prostitution in Vietnam is illegal and considered a serious crime. Nonetheless, Vietnam's Ministry of Labour, Invalids and Social Affairs (MOLISA) has estimated that there were 71,936 prostitutes in the country in 2013. Other estimates put the number at up to 200,000.

Sex workers' organizations report that law enforcement is abusive and corrupt.

MOLISA reported that in 2011, 750 prostitutes and 300 pimps were arrested. 251 businesses had their business licenses revoked for involvement in the sex trade that year.

== History ==
=== Đại Việt period ===
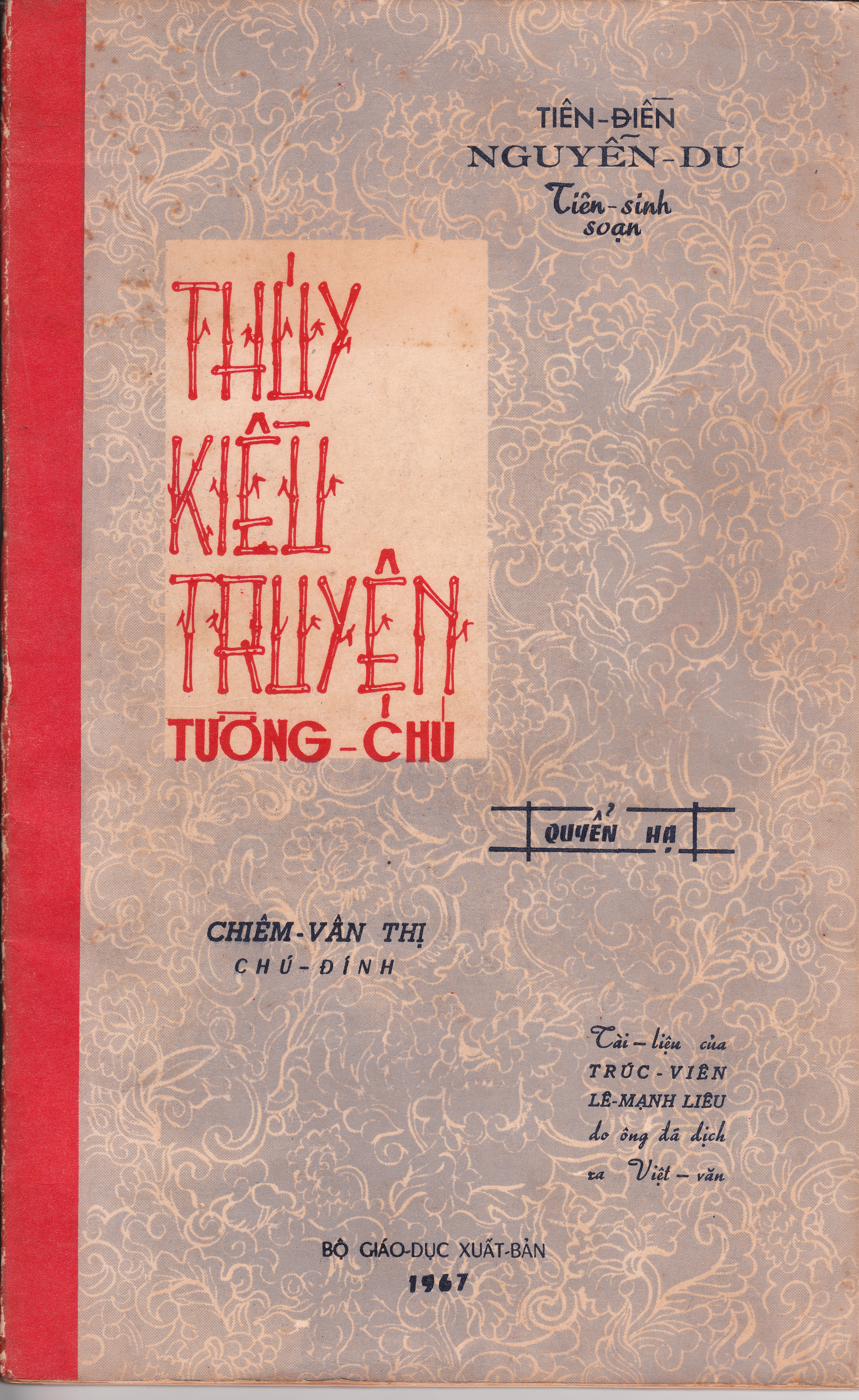
Cover of The Tale of Kiều (1967 reprint) in quốc ngữ script

It is unclear when prostitution and other forms of sex work first appeared in Vietnam. One of the well-known depictions of female sex work in Vietnamese literature appears in The Tale of Kiều (Vietnamese: Truyện Kiều), an epic poem written c. 1800 by the celebrated Vietnamese writer Nguyễn Du. The poem's story centers on the life of Thúy Kiều, a young woman living in mid-sixteenth-century Ming China, who sacrifices herself to save her family. To prevent the imprisonment of her brother and father, she sells herself into marriage, unaware that her new husband is a pimp who forces her into sex work. Despite the poem's focus on forced sex work, it remains popular and moving even for present-day readers, suggesting that sex work is not strictly taboo in Vietnamese society.

The poem is set during the reign of the Jiajing Emperor of Ming China, when Đại Việt was politically independent from China but asserted its membership in a shared, Confucian cultural world alongside China. The poem depicts a form of sex work that resembles Chinese courtesan culture. The protagonist, Kiều, is not just a provider of sexual services but also an entertainer, a performer, and a potential lover. This view of female sex work in Đại Việt, though fictional, complicates the assumption that sex work is necessarily or has always been a transactional exchange of sex for money. The poem reveals a 19th-century understanding of sex work in Vietnam that is rooted in performative and affective, not just sexual, labor. Its continued resonance suggests that this understanding of sex work persists in the present.

Apart from the depiction of female sex work in The Tale of Kiều, scholars have found scant mention of the topic in other documents and texts from the Đại Việt period of Vietnamese history. This lacuna suggests that even if sex work was present, it was treated ambiguously by the Đại Việt rulers. To illustrate, the 1812 legal code promulgated by Emperor Gia Long of the Nguyễn dynasty, the most well-known of pre-colonial legal documents from Vietnam, does not contain any explicit prohibition of sex work, but it does include a provision for punishing male court officials who visit ả đào singing houses, which have a reputation as historic sites of female sex work coupled with courtly entertainment.

=== Colonial period ===
==== Overview ====
During the colonial period, female prostitution and other forms of sex work were not banned but instead heavily regulated by French authorities. The regulations focused heavily on encounters between the colonizing and the colonized (i.e., European men and Vietnamese women), leaving other kinds of sexual encounters and other forms of sex work, including ones involving native men or European women, unregulated. Even then, there was plenty of clandestine or "black market" sex work that took place outside of the regulation system in the colonial period. This situation is akin to that of the pre-colonial period, when sex work was regulated, albeit more loosely, and clandestine sex work also took place outside of the Đại Việt regulation system.

The regulation of female sex work did not exist in a vacuum. Instead, it was part of the colonial government's general system of regulating carnal encounters between the European and the Vietnamese populations. As anthropologist-historian Ann Laura Stoler observes, sex work came to be seen as increasingly permissible when concubinage began falling out of favor with the government in the early 20th century. Concubinage, both in Indochina and much of Southeast Asia, was initially seen in the late 19th century as more conducive than sex work for stabilizing racial hierarchies and preserving public health, because it provided European men in the colonies with an opportunity to build interracial relationships outside of marriage that are stable and do not risk the spread of venereal diseases. However, concubinage produced mixed-race (French: métis) progeny whose identities were seen, increasingly in the early 20th century, as threatening to blur the boundary between colonizer and colonized and, thus, undermine racial hierarchies. In that context, another historian notes that to colonial authorities, sex work became permissible or even preferable to concubinage, because it was seen as a loveless transaction; as such, it was highly regulated but not prohibited outright.

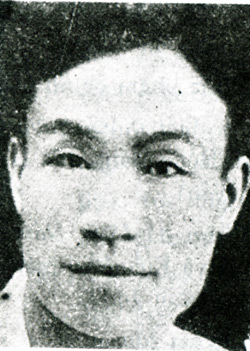
Portrait of Vũ Trọng Phụng, author of Lục Xì

Both colonial records and contemporary native reportages (Vietnamese: phóng sự) tend to frame female sex work in colonial Vietnam as a problem that was not only morally and medically improper but was also a microcosm of some larger problem or fear, whether it had to do with the ineffectiveness of French colonial governance or the decline of Vietnamese society. A clear example of this framing can be found in Lục Xì, a classic reportage of sex work in colonial Hanoi, written in 1937 by Vũ Trọng Phụng, a renowned journalist and author of modernist Vietnamese literature. The work was initially published in a local newspaper (Tương Lai, 'Future') in a serialized format, before it was published as a book later in 1937.

Phụng’s detailed study of the sex industry was only possible because Hanoi's officials wanted to showcase the city's ostensible success in dealing with sex work to journalists and writers like Phụng, which gave him and his contemporaries unprecedented access in 1937 to the municipal dispensary (Vietnamese: nhà lục xì, lit. 'the look-see house') where sex workers were treated for venereal diseases. However, sex work was by no means hidden from public view at the time, nor was the reportage Phụng’s first foray into writing about sex work, as he had just published a novel in 1936 (Làm Đĩ, 'Prostitute') with a fictionalized account of how an upper-class woman becomes a sex worker, written in the style of social realism. Phụng’s view is not simply that sex work was immoral, but that the outsize presence of sex work in Hanoi was a symptom of larger problems—such as exploitative or ineffectual colonial policies, materialistic attitudes, poverty, and the spread of venereal diseases—which stood in stark contrast to French claims that Vietnam was prospering under colonial rule.

On the other hand, the academic scholarship on the colonial period generally presents a view of female sex work as more than just an object of colonial regulation in the name of dealing with moral or medical impropriety, but also as an indication of the sex workers’ agency and a metaphor for the gendered and racial hierarchies that are at the heart of the colonial enterprise. Many sex workers chose this line of work because they wished to escape rural poverty, and the sex industry provided a viable professional opportunity for them to uplift themselves economically. This sense of agency also compelled sex workers to ply their trade in the black market, outside of onerous regulatory requirements and the state's taxation regime. At the same time, sex workers did not always make the choice of entering the profession freely; they might have turned to sex work out of sheer economic desperation or fallen victim to indenture or trafficking schemes. The fact that sex work was even a viable pursuit at all—that European men would patronize Vietnamese female sex workers—also had to do with the gendered and racial order in place at the time, which frequently cast Vietnamese women, in literary, visual, and epistolary depictions, as sexual objects for the European male gaze and desire.

==== Regulations ====
Historians have generally observed that regulations pertaining to sex work in colonial Indochina frequently echoed and influenced similar regulations in France, as described and analyzed by French historian Alain Corbin.

===== Tonkin =====
A dispensary nurse in Hanoi gives a lesson to sex workers on sexual hygiene, c. 1937. (From Lục Xì by Vũ Trọng Phụng.)

Shortly after the establishment of Tonkin as a French protectorate, in 1888, the Hanoi Municipal Council put in place formal regulations on prostitution in the city. (Similar regulations had also been introduced in Haiphong in 1886.) The 1888 regulations include a provision for the official licensing of brothel houses; these licensed brothels (French: maison de tolérance) were the only places where sex work was permitted. At the same time, sex workers had to register their names, ages, places of origin, and place of employment with the municipal police, who maintained an official register of sex workers. Registered prostitutes were known in French as filles publiques, 'public girls' or filles soumises, 'submissive girls' (i.e., they have submitted to the regulatory regime), or in Vietnamese as có giấy, 'has papers'. The regulations also establish a municipal dispensary to screen sex workers for venereal diseases and house them for treatment if necessary—the same institution that would come to occupy the attention of Vũ Trọng Phụng in 1937. In addition, the regulations expressly forbid the act of procuring and dictate that only a woman can be the proprietor of a brothel.

The Hanoi regulations were not set in stone: A modified set of rules, promulgated in 1891, permitted independent sex workers (French: filles isolées) to be licensed to work at a location of their own choosing rather than only at a licensed brothel. In 1907, municipal authorities created a separate "vice squad" or service des moeurs (Vietnamese: đội con gái) in the police force to deal with all matters relating to sex work, including the registration of brothels. Eventually, an extensive, uniform law governing sex work in all of Tonkin was promulgated by the protectorate's résident supérieur (resident superior) in 1921. Besides instituting requirements for registration and regular health checks, and mandatory treatment if a venereal infection were to be discovered, the 1921 law also taxes sex workers’ incomes.

The 1921 law, though ostensibly uniformly applied throughout Tonkin, was, strictly speaking, in force only in the French concessions—the cities of Hanoi and Haiphong, provincial capitals, and military bases—because the French indirectly ruled the rest of the protectorate through the Vietnamese emperor of the Nguyễn dynasty (Emperor Khải Định at the time). (It has also been suggested that the special attention paid to military bases reveals that protecting the health of soldiers in the colonies was a key objective for regulating sex work and preventing the spread of venereal diseases in Tonkin.) This patchwork legal situation created many spaces of non-regulation that sex workers would flock to if they did not wish to submit themselves to a regulatory system that they deemed onerous and oppressive, thus creating a thriving black market for clandestine sex work in Tonkin in the interwar years. The presence of this black market was something that colonial officials frequently worried about, owing to fears about the possibility, in their minds, of an uncontrolled spread of venereal diseases among the buyers and sellers of clandestine, unregulated sex.

===== Cochinchina =====
Much less research has been done on the history of sex work during the colonial period in central and south Vietnam, compared to north Vietnam (Tonkin). Whatever details that have been uncovered by historians about the regulation of sex work in Cochinchina suggest great similarity with the situation in Tonkin. There exist provisions in a 1878 ordinance for the regulation of licensed brothel houses (maison de tolérance), the registration of sex workers either as attached to specific brothels or as independent filles isolées, and regular checks for venereal diseases (French: visite sanitaire) at the municipal dispensary, especially in Saigon and Chợ Lớn (which would merge with Saigon to form a single city in 1931). Just like in Tonkin, the regulatory system was run by a specialized "vice squad" or police des moeurs of the municipal police forces.

According to police and court records from the Cochinchinese archives, proprietors of brothel houses, as well as sex workers themselves, were given short prison sentences of 15 to over 30 days for violating any of the regulations concerning the registration or regular medical inspection of sex workers. In particular, clandestine sex workers—who refused to be subjected to registration and medical requirements—were targeted for harsh enforcement, due to the colonial government's public health fears about them spreading venereal diseases, both amongst themselves and to their European male clients.

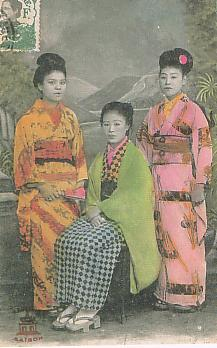
Japanese sex workers in Saigon, c. 1910

==== Foreign sex workers ====
Besides native Vietnamese women, the sex industry in colonial Vietnam also saw the participation of sex workers of other nationalities, including Chinese, Korean, and Japanese. Japanese women who traveled to other places to become sex workers are known as karayuki-san (唐行きさん, 'Ms. Gone-Abroad'). In Vietnam, the French word mousmé was used to refer to Japanese sex workers more specifically as well as all Japanese women more generally, which suggests either that most Japanese women in Vietnam at the time were sex workers or that the French always saw Japanese women in highly sexualized terms. Perspectives on Japanese women in Vietnam at the time were also possibly affected by the 1887 publication of Pierre Loti's novel, Madame Chrysanthème, which has as one of its main characters a mousmé who marries a French naval officer stationed in Meiji era Japan.

Japanese sex workers were present from early in the colonial period: records show that the first mention of a Japanese sex worker in Cochinchina dates to 1883, while in Haiphong, it dates to 1885. They were engaged in similar activities as their native peers, but they would typically offer their services in separate brothels and places of entertainment, or as independent workers. Unlike their Vietnamese peers, many Japanese sex workers would start off being under the yoke of indenture to cover the cost of their journey from Japan to Indochina. Officials saw the Japanese sex workers, in an Orientalizing manner, as allegories or representations of the Japanese nation or certain essentialized Japanese values. The colonial authorities did not seek to prohibit Japanese women from sex work, but merely subjected them to the same registration and medical regulations that applied to Vietnamese sex workers.

Japan exported prostitutes called Karayuki-san during the Meiji and Taisho eras to China, Canada, the United States, Australia, French Indochina, British Malaya, British Borneo, British India and British East Africa, where they served western soldiers and Chinese coolies. The French viewed Japanese prostitutes as cleaner than Vietnamese prostitutes, almost like European women. Japanese prostitutes in French Indochina refused to serve Vietnamese (Annamese) men since they held Vietnamese in contempt as a servant race. French men frequented both Vietnamese prostitutes and Japanese prostitutes in French Indochina.

Japanese women called Karayuki-san migrated to cities like Hanoi, Haiphong and Saigon in colonial French Indochina in the late 19th century to work as prostitutes and provide sexual services to French soldiers who were occupying Vietnam. Since the French viewed Japanese women as clean, they were highly popular. The Japanese prostitutes refused service to Vietnamese men. Images of the Japanese prostitutes in Vietnam were put on French postcards by French photographers. The Japanese government tried to hide the existence of these Japanese prostitutes who went abroad and did not mention them in books on history. Japanese prostitutes were also in other European colonies in Southeast Asia, as well as Australia and the US.

There was also a sizeable number of Chinese sex workers in Vietnam at the time. Their clientele was likely more narrowly focused on the significant populations of Chinese men located throughout the Indochinese colonies then. An attempt in 1903 by the Saigon authorities to subject the places that housed Chinese entertainers to the same regulations as all other brothels in the city did not go well, as the Chinese Chamber of commerce in Saigon intervened to argue that the new regulations were dehumanizing as well as to force the authorities to refrain from imposing new regulations.

=== Vietnam War period ===
During the Vietnam War (American War in Vietnam), a sex industry developed around American servicemen. The number of prostitutes was unknown. Prior to 1975, statistics from the Ministry of Society of the Saigon government reported about 200,000 professional prostitutes. In Saigon alone in 1968, there were about 10,000 professional prostitutes. By 1974, the figure had reached 100,000. While other estimate it higher 300,000 and 500,000, eighty per cent of whom are thought to have had a venereal disease. Prostitutes congregated at bars frequented by GIs, and by Vietnamese soldiers and citizens. They offered a variety of services. Some of the prostitutes became pregnant, and several Amerasian children were born as a result. These children were ostracized and given the derisive name bui doi ('dust of life'). Often, these children were themselves forced into prostitution.

During the war, hooch maids often cleaned up after the soldiers in their dwellings. One soldier described the maids as being, "...good Catholics who might flirt with you but would never date an American soldier." At the same time, it was not unheard of for maids to "keep the plumbing clean" for soldiers to earn extra income.

After the war, the Vietnamese government introduced a rehabilitation program for former prostitutes. Despite this and the government's subsequent HIV/AIDS education program, economic development during the 1990s saw women from poor rural communities taking up prostitution with a new class of professional clients.

== Legal situation ==
The "Ordinance on Prostitution Prevention and Combat" 2003 states:

- Article 4: The following acts are strictly prohibited:
  - 1. Buying sex;
  - 2. Selling sex;
  - 3. Harboring prostitution;
  - 4. Organizing prostitution activities;
  - 5. Forcing prostitution;
  - 6. Brokering prostitution;
  - 7. Protecting prostitution;
  - 8. Abusing the service business for prostitution activities;
  - 9. Other acts related to prostitution activities as prescribed by law.
- Article 23.- Handling of prostitutes
  - 1. Prostitutes shall, depending on the nature and seriousness of their violations, be administratively sanctioned, applied with the measure of education in communes, wards or townships or sent into medical treatment establishments. Foreign prostitutes shall, depending on the nature and seriousness of their violations, be administratively sanctioned in the forms of caution, fine and/or expulsion.
  - 2. Prostitutes who, though being aware of their HIV infection, deliberately transmit the disease to other persons shall be examined for penal liability.
- Article 24.- Handling of persons committing prostitution-related acts
  - 1. Those who protect prostitution, contribute capital for use for prostitution purposes, shall, depending on the nature and seriousness of their violations, be administratively sanctioned or examined for penal liability.
  - 2. Those who act as go-betweens for prostitution, harbor prostitution, coerce prostitution, organize prostitution, traffic in women and/or children in the service of prostitution activities shall be examined for penal liability.

Following complaints that Article 23.1 was in violation of the prostitute's rights, in June 2012, the "Law on Administrative Sanctions" ordered the release of all prostitutes and replaced "re-education" with a fine of between the equivalent of $25 and $100. (About 1,300 prostitutes were in "rehabilitation’ centres" in July 2011, being "treated and re-educated’).

=== Calls for decriminalization ===
A survey of 150 prostitutes by the Vietnamese government-run "Institute of Labor Science and Social Affairs" found that 44 percent of prostitutes had suffered violence at the hands of clients. Just under half did not report the crimes to the authorities. The "Vietnam Network of Sex Workers" have called for decriminalization to make sex work safer. Kimberly Kay Hoang, assistant professor of sociology at the University of Chicago, who conducted a 2011 study of prostitutes in Ho Chi Minh City, is quoted as saying: "Legalising prostitution would also reduce violence and sex crimes such as rape and sexual violence. Prostitutes would feel safe calling the police to report instances of violence and abuse by clients, traffickers, and pimps to law enforcement officials." Mr. Le Duc Hien, deputy director of a government department tasked with fighting social evils under the labor ministry, crystallized this by telling the media: "It would be a strategic mistake to tap prostitution as an industry to boost tourism revenues. What would happen if we recognize sex work as a profession but fail to manage it later on?"

== Terminology ==
Various groups and individuals in Vietnam, including sex worker activists, scholars, the media, and non-governmental organizations such as the Vietnam Network of Sex Workers (part of the Asia Pacific Network of Sex Workers), prefer using the term sex work instead of prostitution. The Vietnamese government still refers almost exclusively to prostitution and prostitutes as the targets of its policies, whether that is the criminalization or the potential legalization of sex work in the country. There is no clear or consistent pattern in how the terms are applied, even though there is an increasing awareness of other forms of sex work that so-called prostitutes may in fact be engaging in, such as webcam modeling. There is also a recognition that the term sex work may not fully encompass the problem of sex trafficking, which Vietnam continues to deal with, as the term implies that a certain level of agency and willingness to engage in sexual labor, which victims of sex trafficking have been denied. In discussing the historical phenomenon, some scholars argue that using the term sex work is anachronistic and prefer the term prostitution instead, as the latter term is what was used in documents and texts from the past. Conversely, other scholars argue that the phenomenon was just as diverse in the past as it is in the present, so the term sex work is perhaps more appropriate than the term prostitution as an all-encompassing reference, and certainly more aligned with how sex workers in the present prefer to be identified and discussed.

== HIV ==
There is a problem of HIV among sex workers. Fear of detection prevents prostitutes from accessing health services, and so infections go untreated and spread. Advocates of decriminalization submit that where prostitution is illegal, sex workers are more susceptible to STIs.

At a conference in 2011, a paper presented by Vietnam's Labor Ministry said 9.3% of prostitutes in the country were infected with HIV. However, some areas were considerably higher: Hanoi 20%, Ho Chi Minh City 16%, and Hai Phong 23%. Lack of access to condoms and medical services was the primary cause. Prostitutes may also avoid condoms, as they can be used as evidence of prostitution.

A study of 5,298 prostitutes published in 2015 by "Drug Alcohol Depend" concluded that injected drug use is also a key risk factor for HIV transmission amongst prostitutes.

== Vietnamese prostitution in other nations ==
Vietnamese prostitution is not confined to the country itself. In Ho Chi Minh City and the Mekong Delta, there are reports of women being forced into prostitution after marrying overseas, particularly in other Asian countries. In Macau, the exploitation of women has been supported by legal organizations. In the end, these women were often forced into indentured servitude or prostitution. Many women travel from Lao Cai to Hekou County in China to work in brothels that cater to Chinese men.

== Child trafficking ==
In Ho Chi Minh City, many of the prostitutes are under 18 years of age. Some were forced into the trade because of economic needs. The prostitutes are both girls and boys (called Trai bao ("covered boy") and trai gọi ("call boy")). In addition, children are trafficked due to the demand for prostitution in other countries. One non-governmental organization estimates that the average age of trafficked girls is between 15 and 17, although the average age of girls trafficked to Cambodia is estimated to be much lower. In the Sa Pa tourist region, an Australian non-governmental organization uncovered 80 commercial cases of child exploitation by foreign nationals in 2007, the same year that the nation established a child sex tourism investigative unit within the Vietnam Ministry of Public Security.

== Sex trafficking ==
Vietnam is listed as a Tier 2 country for human trafficking by the US Department of State Office to Monitor and Combat Trafficking in Persons.

Vietnam is a source and, to a lesser extent, a destination country for women and children subjected to sex trafficking. Vietnamese women and children are subjected to sex trafficking abroad; many are misled by fraudulent employment opportunities and sold to brothel operators on the borders of China, Cambodia, and Laos, and elsewhere in Asia, including Thailand, Malaysia, the Republic of Korea, Taiwan, and Singapore. Some Vietnamese women who travel abroad for internationally brokered marriages or jobs in restaurants, massage parlors, and karaoke bars — mostly to China, Malaysia, and Singapore – are subjected to forced prostitution. False advertising, debt bondage, passport confiscation, and threats of deportation are tactics commonly used to compel Vietnamese victims into servitude. Traffickers increasingly use the internet, gaming sites, and particularly social media to lure potential victims into vulnerable situations; for example, men entice young women and girls with online dating relationships and persuade them to move abroad, then subject them to sex trafficking.

Many children from impoverished rural areas, and a rising number from middle-class and urban settings, are subjected to sex trafficking. Child sex tourists, reportedly from elsewhere in Asia, the United Kingdom and other countries in Europe, Australia, Canada, and the United States, exploit children in Vietnam.

== Portrayal in media ==
=== Miss Saigon ===
The protagonist of the 1989 musical Miss Saigon is a Vietnamese prostitute named Kim. Echoing the plot of Puccini's opera Madama Butterfly, Kim falls in love with and is left pregnant by a client who is a white American soldier with a wife at home. After he has abandoned her for his American wife, Kim realizes her child's father will never return and shoots herself. The show drew criticism for promoting the stereotype of a dominant/submissive relationship between a Western man and an Asian prostitute.

=== Âm Tính ===
The 2008 Vietnamese television series Âm Tính is a documentary about Lam Uyen Nhi, a former beauty contest winner turned prostitute and drug addict. Eventually, Lam died in 2007 after a battle with HIV/AIDS. The 20-part series focuses on Lam's ups and downs, with 2006 Miss Vietnam winner Mai Phuong Thuy playing the role of Lam.

=== Hearts and Minds ===
The 1974 film Hearts and Minds features scenes of prostitution at both the beginning of the film and during the middle of it. The first scene depicts soldiers soliciting prostitutes in Saigon, and the second scene includes interviews with soldiers who are with prostitutes, with questions asked about the war and their current activities.

=== Lost in Paradise ===
The 2011 film Lost in Paradise is a film that features two storylines; the main storyline focuses on gay male prostitution, and the secondary storyline features a female prostitute. The film also includes violence against prostitutes for being gay. A Vancouver International Film Festival reviewer said that he felt the film's portrayal of gay prostitution was "authentic."

== See also ==
- Prostitutes in South Korea for the U.S. military
- Prostitution in colonial India
- History of prostitution in France
