= Hailar (disambiguation) =

Hailar may refer to:

- Hailar District, district (former city) in Inner Mongolia, China
- Hailar River, part of the Russia-China border
- Hailar Fortress, former Japanese military fortress, now memorial site in Hulunbuir, Inner Mongolia, China
