= Sanhe Hui Ethnic Township =

Sanhe Township 三河回族乡 ᠰᠠᠨ ᠾᠧ ᠬᠣᠲᠣᠩ ᠦᠨᠳᠦᠰᠦᠲᠡᠨ ᠤ ᠰᠢᠶᠠᠩ
- Ethnic township
- Location in Inner Mongolia
- Coordinates: 50°27′03″N 120°06′33″E
- Country: People's Republic of China
- Region: Inner Mongolia
- Prefecture-level city: Hulunbuir
- County-level city: Ergun
- Village-level divisions: 3 residential communities
- Elevation: 645 m (2,116 ft)

Population (2006)
  - Total: 11,497
- Time zone: UTC+8 (China Standard)
- Area code: 0470

Sanhe (Chinese: 三河; pinyin: Sānhé; lit. 'three rivers') San gye khoton ündestenii shiyan (Mongolian: ᠰᠠᠨ
ᠾᠧ
ᠬᠣᠲᠣᠩ
ᠦᠨᠳᠦᠰᠦᠲᠡᠨ ᠤ
ᠰᠢᠶᠠᠩ ; Сан ге хотон үндэстэний шиян) is a Hui ethnic township of Ergun City in northeastern Inner Mongolia, People's Republic of China, located about 24 kilometres (15 mi) north-northwest of downtown Ergun. As of 2018, it has 3 residential communities (居委会) under its administration, and as of 2006, 11,497 resided here. It is the home of the Sanhe cattle and Sanhe horse.

== Education ==
There are two schools: Ergun City Sanhe Primary School (额尔古纳市三河小学) and Ergun City Sanhe Secondary School (额尔古纳市三河中学).

== See also ==
- List of township-level divisions of Inner Mongolia
