= Enhe =

Enhe Russian Ethnic Township: 恩和俄罗斯族民族乡 (Chinese); Эньхэ-Русская национальная волость (Russian); ᠡᠩᠬᠡ ᠣᠷᠣᠰ ᠦᠨᠳᠦᠰᠦᠲᠡᠨ ᠦ ᠰᠢᠶᠠᠩ (Mongolian)
- Ethnic township
- Location within Inner Mongolia Location within China
- Coordinates: 50.819°N 119.911°E
- Country: China
- Autonomous region: Inner Mongolia
- Prefecture-level city: Hulunbuir
- County-level city: Ergun City

Area
  - Total: 2,068 km^{2} (798 sq mi)

Population (2017)
  - Total: 2,339
  - Density: 1.131/km^{2} (2.929/sq mi)

Enhe

Chinese name
- Simplified Chinese: 恩和俄罗斯民族乡
- Traditional Chinese: 恩和俄羅斯民族鄉
Transcriptions
Standard Mandarin
- Hanyu Pinyin: Ēnhé Èluósī Mínzú Xiāng

Mongolian name
- Mongolian script: ᠡᠩᠬᠡ ᠣᠷᠣᠰ ᠦᠨᠳᠦᠰᠦᠲᠡᠨ ᠦ ᠰᠢᠶᠠᠩ

Russian name
- Russian: Эньхэ-Русская национальная волость

Enhe Russian Ethnic Township (Note: Chinese: 恩和俄罗斯民族乡; pinyin: Ēnhé Èluósī Mínzú Xiāng; Russian: Эньхэ-Русская национальная волость; Mongolian: ᠡᠩᠬᠡ ᠣᠷᠣᠰ ᠦᠨᠳᠦᠰᠦᠲᠡᠨ ᠦ ᠰᠢᠶᠠᠩ) is an ethnic township in Northeast Inner Mongolia under the administration of Ergun City. The township along the banks of the Argun River. Enhe is the only ethnic township in China designated for China's Russian minority. Enhe spans an area of 2,068 square kilometres (798 mi^{2}), and has a population of 2,339 people as of 2017.

== Geography ==
Enhe spans an area of 2,068 square kilometres (798 mi^{2}), with its center located 98 kilometres (61 mi) north of Ergun's urban center. Enhe's terrain is largely hilly, with its elevation ranging from 700 metres (2,300 ft) to 1,000 metres (3,300 ft) above sea level. The ethnic township shares a 75 kilometres (47 mi) border with Russia, determined by the Argun River.

=== Flora and fauna ===
The ethnic township hosts much undisturbed nature, including large swathes of virgin forests and grasslands. Plants native to Enhe include lingonberries, blueberries, Chinese skullcaps, and dangshen. Animals native to Enhe include the Asian black bear, the Siberian roe deer, the lynx, and the Hazel grouse.

=== Climate ===
Enhe experiences an average annual temperature between −5 °C (23 °F) and −4 °C (25 °F), with the lowest recorded temperature being −50 °C (−58 °F), and the highest recorded temperature being 39 °C (102 °F). The ethnic township experiences an average annual precipitation between 450 millimetres (18 in) and 600 millimetres (24 in). On average, Enhe experiences 90 frost-free days per year.

== Demographics ==
As of March 2017, Enhe's population totals 2,339, and is largely descended from mixed marriages of Han Chinese and Russians. A 2019 publication from the ethnic township's government states that 1,309 of Enhe's 2,339 people, or 55.96% of its total population, is either ethnically Russian or have both Russian and Chinese heritage, whereas a 2021 publication from Ergun's municipal government suggests that 80% of Enhe's population have some Russian lineage. A 2026 report indicated that much of the Russian heritage of the city has become largely decorative to display for tourists, however. Most of the 40% of the population registered as Russians only speak Chinese, and the Russian Orthodox Church in the town has been closed.

Records of marriages between Chinese and Russians in the region date back to the 1890s from the beginning of Russian colonization of Manchuria. Unlike the conventional colonial marriage pattern of Western men marrying native women, the predominant combination in Manchuria was between Russian women and Chinese men. Mixed families are mainly settled along the towns and villages of the Argun River including Enhe, which is the only one of the settlements to be an official ethnic Russian township.

In addition to Russian and Han Chinese populations, Enhe is also home to Mongol, Hui, Manchu, Korean, Daur, Oroqen, and Evenk populations.

== Economy ==
Sizable mineral resources run through the region, including gold, lead, zinc, iron and copper.

Enhe hosts one state-owned ranch and two state-owned tree farms.

== History ==
In the 19th century, the discovery of gold brought Russian miners into the region. A railway line was also built to manage extraction of resources. Meanwhile, Chinese laborers – nearly all single men – helped build and work on these Russian-led ventures, some of them marrying Russian women. After the 1917 Russian Revolution, defeated "Whites" who had opposed the "Reds" (Bolsheviks) fled Russia, some of them coming to Enhe, resulting in another wave of Russians.

The independence of the Russian community was curtailed during the Cultural Revolution of 1966–1976 as well as the Sino-Soviet split. The Red Guards destroyed many Orthodox churches and ethnic Russians were denounced for disloyalty, resulting in many of them fleeing back to Russia or to elsewhere. It was largely the children of the mixed marriages who stayed during this period.

== Education ==
There is one school: Ergun City Enhe Primary School (额尔古纳市恩和小学).

== Tourism ==
Enhe has emerged as a tourism destination noted for its peaceful countryside backdrop. Lonely Planet describes Enhe as "a charming village brimming with an unhurried and authentic atmosphere" where "herders milk their cows outside their properties when they aren't taking them out to pasture". Tourism is also enhanced by the Russian cultural ties of the township including Russian bakeries and buildings with the architectural stylings of traditional Russian wooden cottages. There is also homestay accommodation in Enhe giving a representation of traditional Russian village living.

There were plans to enclose the village and charge an entrance fee, though as of 2023 no such actions have been taken.

== See also ==
- Shiwei, Inner Mongolia – neighboring town
