= Shiwei, Inner Mongolia =

Mengwu Shiwei 蒙兀室韦苏木 • Мынъу-Шивэй • ᠮᠣᠩᠭᠣᠯ ᠰᠢᠭᠤᠢ ᠰᠤᠮᠤ
- Sum
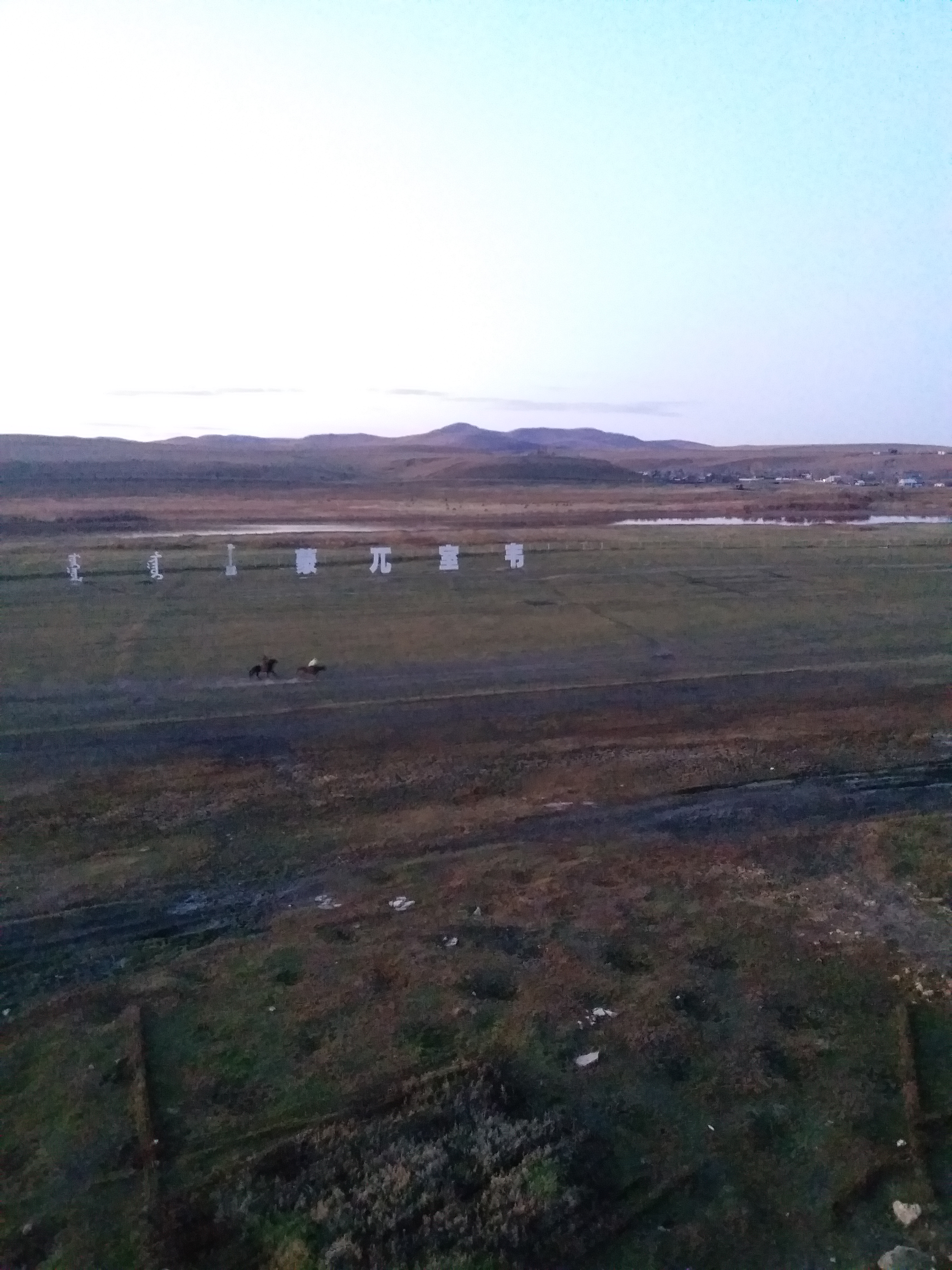
- Facing Russia across the Ergun River
- Interactive map of Mengwu Shiwei
- Coordinates: 51°20′14″N 119°53′47″E
- Country: China
- Autonomous region: Inner Mongolia
- Prefecture-level city: Hulunbuir
- County-level city: Ergun City

Mengwu Shiwei (Chinese: 蒙兀室韦苏木; pinyin: Mēng wù Shì wéi Sū mù); Russian: Сомон Мынъу-Шивэй) Mongol Shugui Sum (Mongolian: ᠮᠣᠩᠭᠣᠯ
ᠰᠢᠭᠤᠢ
ᠰᠤᠮᠤ; Монгол Шугуй Сум) is a sum (a type of township-level division) under the administration of Ergun City, northeastern Inner Mongolia, situated directly on the border with the Russian-Siberian Far East. Shiwei is known for its use of Russian architecture, including many domed buildings in the Russian style.

The township is one of the main border crossings between China and Russia, lying on one side of the Ergune River. On the opposite bank lies the Russian village of Olochi, Zabaykalsky Krai, which connects to Shiwei via the Friendship Bridge.

== Demographics ==
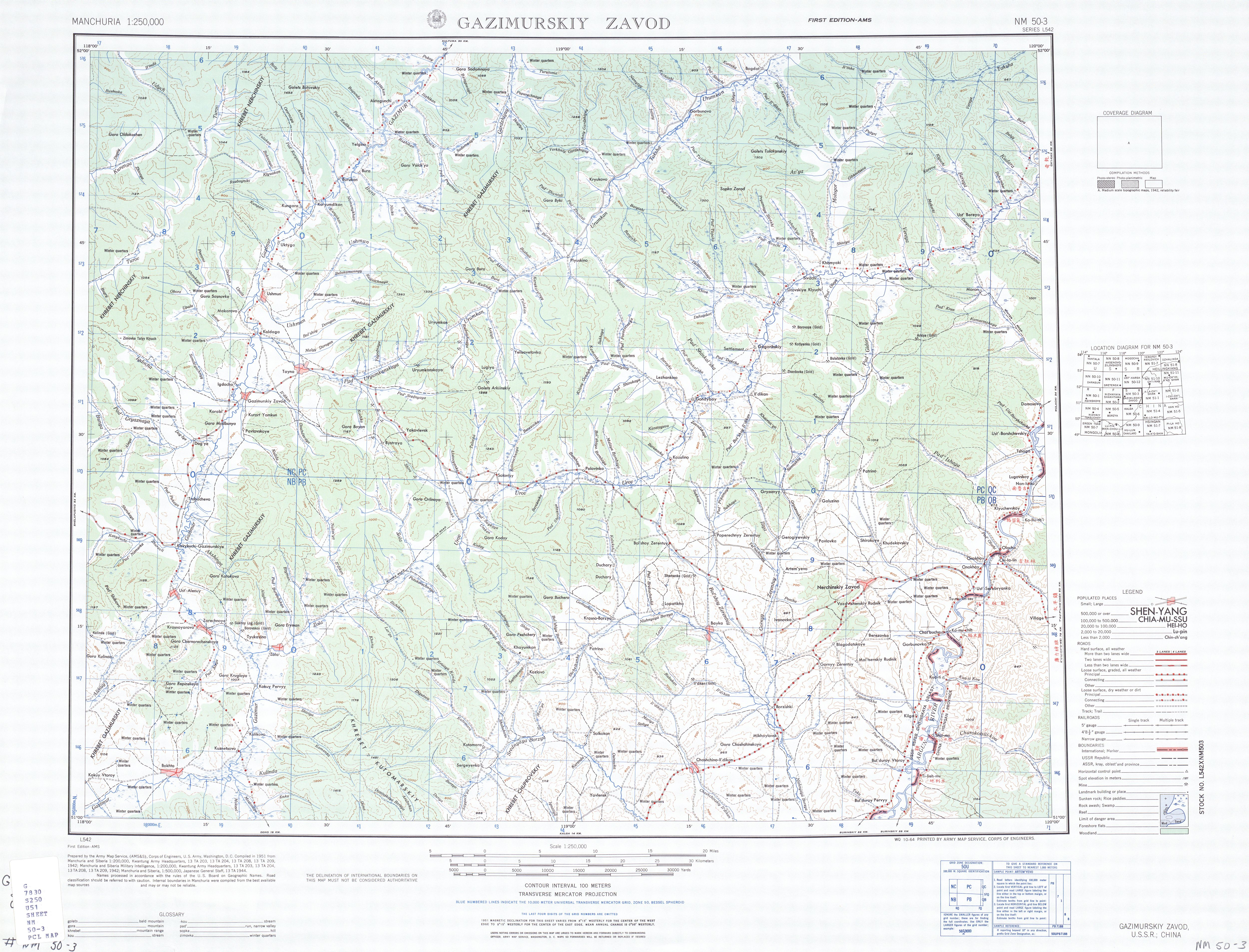
Map, including the area where the modern bridge was erected (1951).

Shiwei is notable for being home to descendants of ethnic Russians, one of China's smallest minorities (Russians are among the 56 nationalities officially recognized in China). They mostly live in the neighboring township of Enhe (恩和俄羅斯族鄉), which, since 2011, has split with Shiwei to become an ethnic township.

Ethnic Russians first arrived in large numbers to (what was) Manchuria during the 1890s as colonists. Marriages between Russian women and Han Chinese men in the towns and villages of the frontier areas along the Ergun River, including in Shiwei, became more common around this time and into the early twentieth century. However, intermarrying between Chinese women and Russian men were relatively rare, a contrast to the stereotypical image of Asian women marrying European (or otherwise Western) men.

== Economy ==
Shiwei serves as a border crossing between China and Russia. A Friendship Bridge was built following a joint agreement between Russia and China to construct it in 2001, an outcome of the 1991 Sino-Soviet Border Agreement. The treaty was implemented to resolve border disputes between the two states. Social anthropologist Ed Pulford has described the Friendship Bridge as an example of how "even the most fervent attempts to forge cross-border linkages can become almost comically ineffective" when it comes to Russian–Chinese relations, as passenger traffic is not permitted, and the bridge primarily serves as a crossing for trucks carrying quarried stone into China, amongst other goods transported between the countries.

== Education ==
There is one school, Ergun City Shiwei Primary School (额尔古纳市室韦小学).

== Tourism ==
Domestic tourists on package tours stop in Shiwei to view the Russian side from a viewing platform, on the riverbank on the Chinese side of the Friendship Bridge. The central square of Shiwei offers nighttime entertainment in the form of neon lights, techno music, and an atmosphere of "revelry", in addition to many shops and eateries.

Along with neighboring Enhe, Shiwei is marketed as a tourist destination, inviting visitors to experience a "Russian town" in China. Since being listed in 2005 by CCTV as one of the "top ten most beautiful townships in China", Shiwei has seen an influx of tourists. However, domestic media and tour operators have seemingly given more weight to Enhe as the preferred locale to experience a "Russian" village.
