= Argun (Amur) =

River in Russia and China

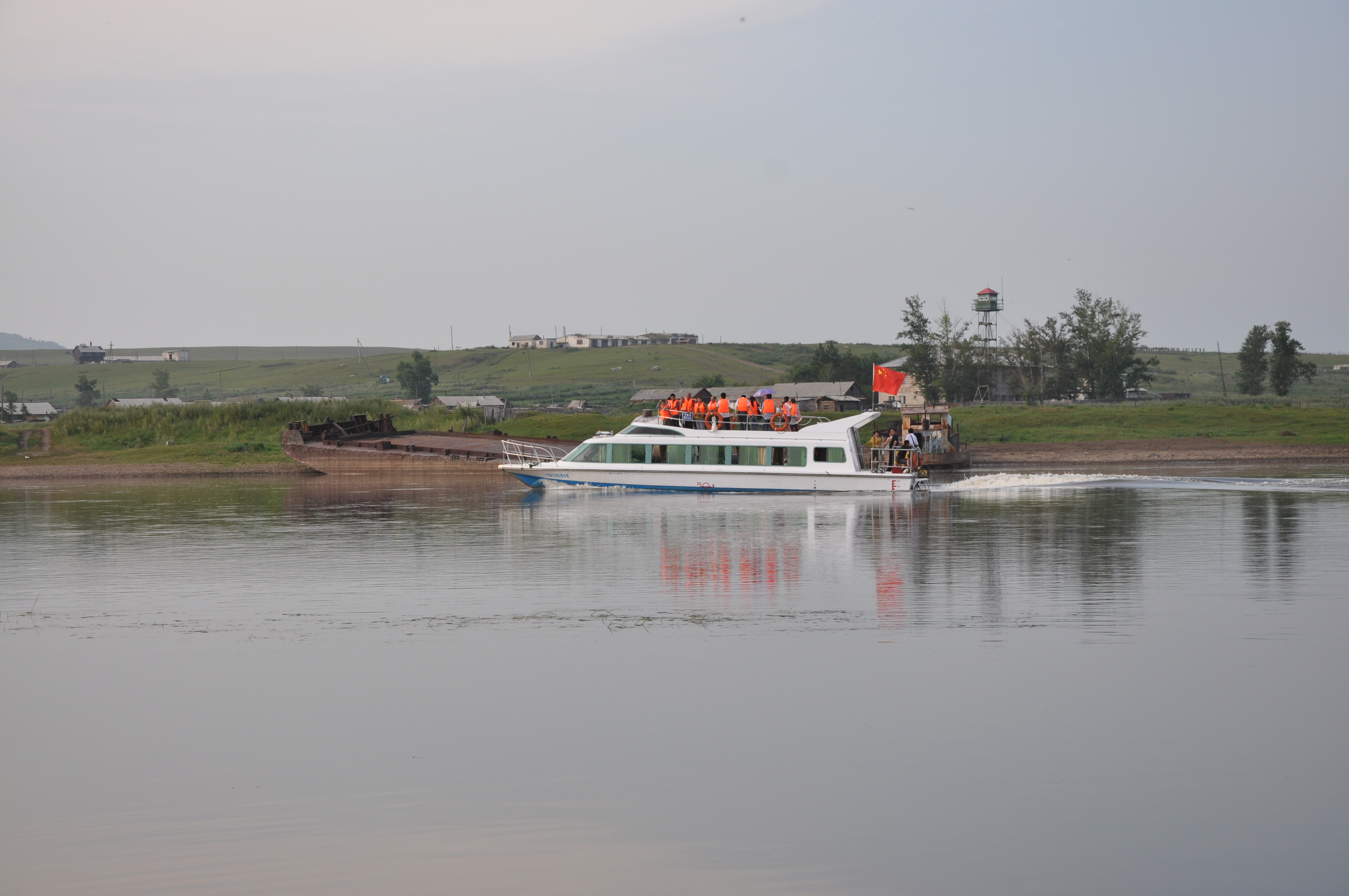
- Taken from Shiwei, Inner Mongolia, China. Russia is on the opposite side.

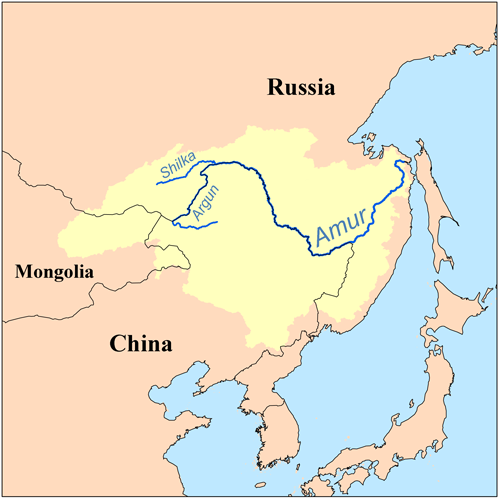
- Etymology: Derived from Proto-Mongolic *ergene 'wide'
- Native name: Эргүнэ (Mongolian); Эргэнэ (Buryat); 额尔古纳 (Chinese); Ергэне (Evenki); Аргунь (Russian)

Location
- Country: China, Russia
- Russian Krai: Zabaykalsky Krai
- Chinese Region: Hulunbuir

Physical characteristics
- Source: Hailar
  - location: Greater Khingan mountains
  - coordinates: 49.937°N 122.465°E
- 2nd source: Kherlen
  - location: about 195 kilometres (121 mi) from Ulaanbaatar
  - coordinates: 48°N 109°E
  - elevation: 1,961 m (6,434 ft)
- Mouth: Amur
  - coordinates: 53°20′N 121°28′E
- Length: 1,620 km (1,010 mi)
- Basin size: 164,000 km^{2} (63,000 sq mi)
- Discharge
  - average: 340 m^{3}/s (12,000 cu ft/s)

Basin features
- Progression: Amur→ Sea of Okhotsk

Argun
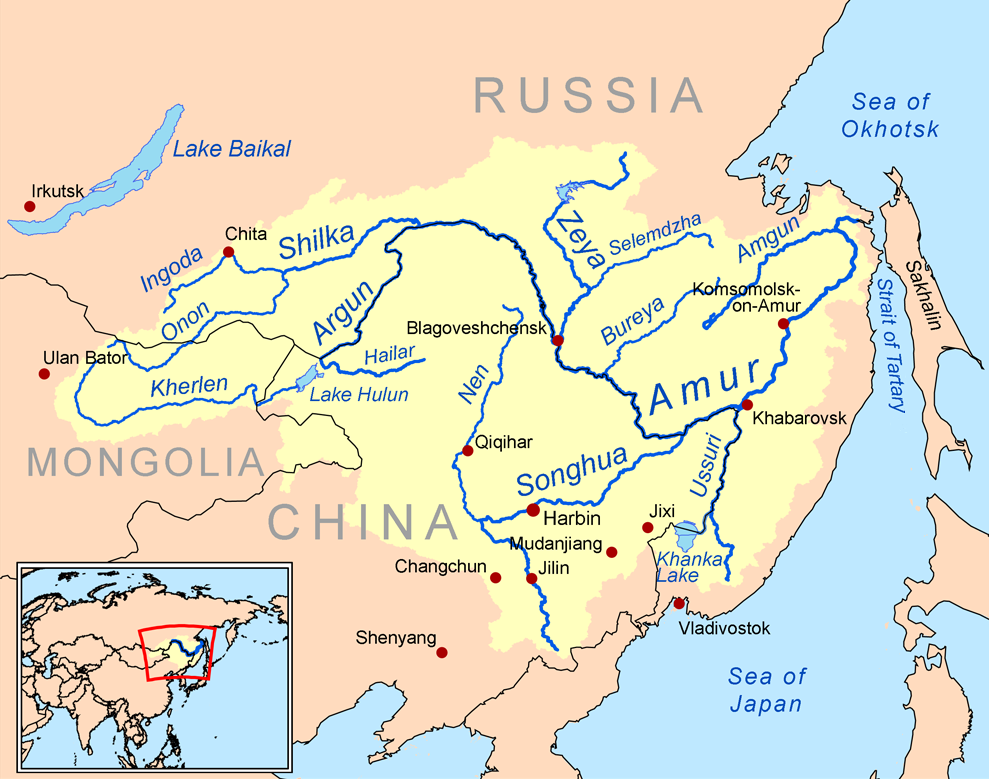
- Argun River in the Amur basin

Chinese name
- Chinese: 额尔古纳河
Transcriptions
Standard Mandarin
- Hanyu Pinyin: Érgǔnà hé

Mongolian name
- Mongolian Cyrillic: Эргүнэ мөрөн
Transcriptions
- SASM/GNC: Ergüne gol

Manchu name
- Manchu script
- Romanization: Ergune bira

Russian name
- Russian: Аргунь

The Argun /ɑːrˈɡuːn/ or Ergune (Chinese: 额尔古纳河) is a 1,620-kilometre (1,010 mi) long river that forms part of the eastern China–Russia border, together with the Amur. Its upper reaches are known as the Hailar River (海拉尔河) in China. The Argun marks the border (established by the Treaty of Nerchinsk in 1689) between Russia and China for about 944 kilometres (587 mi), until it meets the Amur.

== Name ==
The name derives from Buryat Urgengol 'wide river' (urgen 'wide' + gol 'river'). Mongolian word "ergün" (in Traditional Mongolian alphabet) or "örgön" (in modern Mongolian) means "wide".

== Geography ==
The river flows from the western slope of the Greater Xing'an Range in China's Inner Mongolia, and forms the Chinese side of the two rivers that flow together to produce the Amur (Heilong). Its confluence with the Shilka at Ust-Strelka on the Russian side forms the Amur. The Argun is 1,620 kilometres (1,010 mi) long including its upper course Hailar, and has a drainage basin of 164,000 square kilometres (63,000 sq mi). Its main tributaries are the Urov, Uryumkan and Gazimur from the left, and the Gen He from the right.

== Kherlen–Argun–Amur ==
In years with high precipitation, the normally exitless Hulun Lake may overflow at its northern shore, and the water will meet the Argun after about 30 kilometres (19 mi). The Kherlen–Argun–Amur system has a total length of 5,052 kilometres (3,139 mi).

== History ==
In The Secret History of the Mongols is a legend related to the Ergüne hun Mongol ancestry. In this legend, the Mongols prevailed over other tribes and carried such slaughter among them, that in living remained no more than two men and two women. These two families, in fear of the enemy, fled to the inhospitable terrain, which included only mountains and forests and to which there was no road. Among those mountains was the abundant grass and healthy climate of the steppe. Then, legend tells that in Ergune-Khun, Mongols multiplied and become masters of iron smelting and blacksmithing. According to legend, it is the art of melting iron that has helped them escape from the mountain gorges on scope of the current Mongolian steppes, to the Kherlen (Kelulun) and Onon rivers.

Prior to the emergence of the Mongols, the Amur River basin was home to certain tribes of Jurchen people, who founded the Jin dynasty (1115–1234) in northern China. The Manchu people who founded the Qing dynasty (1644–1912) additionally claimed descent from the Jurchens. Following the Russian conquest of Siberia in the 17th century, Russia-China relations were formalized in the 1689 Treaty of Nerchinsk, which established the Argun River as the China–Russia border. However, prior to the Amur Annexation of Outer Manchuria, China's border extended further to include the so-called Sixty-Four Villages East of the River in present-day Amur Oblast, southern Khabarovsk, and all of Primorsky Krai. Although the subsequent Amur Annexation fixed the eastern Sino-Russian border at the Amur, it would only be at the 1991 Sino-Soviet Border Agreement when all Sino-Soviet border conflicts would be resolved.
