= Haikou Ring Expressway =

Road in Hainan, China

Haikou Ring Expressway
- 海口绕城高速公路

Route information
- Length: 50.1 km (31.1 mi)

Major junctions
- West end: G98 / G225 in Chengmai County, Hainan
- East end: G9812 in Meilan District, Haikou, Hainan

Location
- Country: China

Highway system
- National Trunk Highway System; Primary; Auxiliary; National Highways; Transport in China

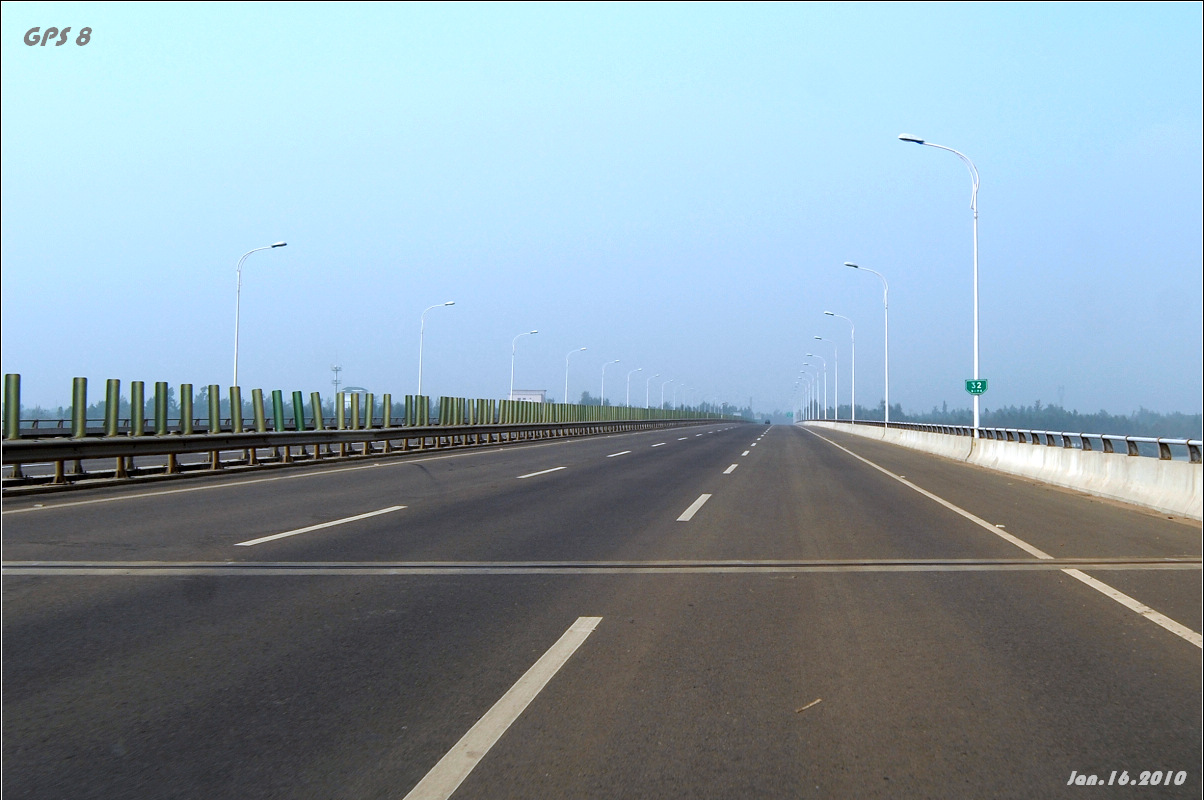
Haikou Ring Expressway in January 2010

The Haikou Ring Expressway (Chinese: 海口绕城高速公路), designated as G98 and Hainan Provincial Expressway S82, is a 50.1-kilometre-long expressway (31.1 mi) in Haikou, Hainan, China.

== History ==
Opened on 6 August 2008, it is now part of G98 (Haikou section, connecting the original East-West Expressway). The second phase of the project G9812 (Meilan Airport Interchange-Yanfeng Interchange) was opened to traffic on 21 September 2019.

The expressway originally had the G1501 route marker until 2017 when it was renumbered as the G9801. In July 2022, the G9801 designation was officially removed, along with a number of other ring roads of coastal cities in the NTHS, because Haikou is a coastal city and it would be inefficient to route a brand new expressway into the sea for no reason.
