= G9813 Wanning–Yangpu Expressway =

Expressway in Hainan, China

Wanning–Yangpu Expressway
- 万宁－洋浦高速公路

Route information
- Length: 163.524 km (101.609 mi)

Location
- Country: China

Highway system
- National Trunk Highway System; Primary; Auxiliary; National Highways; Transport in China
← G9812	→ G9901

The Wanning-Yangpu Expressway (Chinese: 万洋高速公路), designated as G9813, is an expressway located in Hainan, China. The starting point is G98 Hainan Interchange, via Qiongzhong (Lingmen Junction in Qiongzhong and G9811 Haikou–Sanya Expressway is connected), with Danzhou reaching the end of Baimajing Interchange, connecting G98 Hainan Ring Road West Section and the Luzhou Yangpu Bridge connecting line.
