= China National Highway 228 (Taiwan) =

Hypothetical road, planned by the mainland China government in Taiwan

National Highway 228
- 228国道

Route information
- Length: 956 km (594 mi)

Location
- Country: China

Highway system
- National Trunk Highway System; Primary; Auxiliary

National Highway 228 was a hypothetical highway encircling the island of Taiwan as part of the National Highway System of the People's Republic of China. It never came into existence due to the political status of Taiwan. The People's Republic of China claims control over Taiwan, but has never controlled it. Taiwan is administered by the Republic of China. Taiwan has its own highway system and does not recognize the designation by the People's Republic of China.

This observation was eventually dropped in new National Highway plans, replaced by the Dandong-Dongxing Highway in 2013.

== See also ==
- Taiwan Province, People's Republic of China
- G99 Taiwan Ring Expressway
- Highway system in Taiwan
