= Qushi'an =

Qu'ngoin 曲什安镇 · ཆུ་སྔོན་གྲོང་བརྡལ། Qushi'an
- Town
- Location in Qinghai
- Coordinates: 35°19′33″N 100°14′4″E
- Country: China
- Province: Qinghai
- Autonomous prefecture: Hainan
- County: Xinghai

Area
  - Total: 723.5 km^{2} (279.3 sq mi)

Population (2010)
  - Total: 5,389
  - Density: 7.449/km^{2} (19.29/sq mi)
- Time zone: UTC+8 (China Standard)
- Local dialing code: 974

Qu'ngoin or Qushi'an (Tibetan: ཆུ་སྔོན་གྲོང་བརྡལ།, Chinese: 曲什安镇) is a town under the jurisdiction of Xinghai County, Hainan Tibetan Autonomous Prefecture, Qinghai, China, surrounded by Balung Township of Tongde County across the Yellow River to the east, Zhongtü and Lungsang townships to the south, Qukoi Township to the west and Tangnag Township to the north. As of 2010, Qu'ngoin has a total population of 5,389: 2,958 males and 2,431 females: 1,248 aged under 14, 3,897 aged between 15 and 64 and 244 aged over 65.
