= China National Highway 226 =

Abandoned road in China

National Highway 226
- 226国道

Route information
- Length: 298 km (185 mi)

Major junctions
- From: Chuxiong, Yunnan
- To: Mojiang, Yunnan

Location
- Country: China

Highway system
- National Trunk Highway System; Primary; Auxiliary
← G225	→ G227

China National Highway 226 (226国道) was a planned National Highway in China which would run from Chuxiong City to Mojiang within the Yunnan province. It was planned to have a length of 298 km.

However, it was delegated to provincial highway as it is entirely in Yunnan.

== Route and distance ==
Route and distance

City	Distance (km)
Chuxiong, Yunnan	0
Shuangbai, Yunnan	58
Mojiang, Yunnan	298

== See also ==
- China National Highways
