= G98 Hainan Island Ring Expressway =

Beltway in Hainan Province of China

Hainan Island Ring Expressway
- 海南地区环线高速公路
- Hainan Island Ring Expressway 海南环岛高速

Route information
- Length: 612.8 km (380.8 mi)

Major junctions
- Orbital around Hainan
- G9801 / Hainan S81 / Hainan S82 in Haikou; G9812 in Qionghai (future); G9813 in Wanning (future); G224 / Hainan S85 in Sanya; Hainan S84 in Sanya; G9811 in Ledong; G9813 in Danzhou (future); G225 / G9801 in Chengmai; G224 in Haikou; G9811 in Haikou

Location
- Country: China
- Major cities: Haikou, Qionghai, Wanning, Sanya, Dongfang, Danzhou

Highway system
- National Trunk Highway System; Primary; Auxiliary; National Highways; Transport in China
← G9511	→ G9811

The Hainan Island Ring Expressway (simplified Chinese: 海南环岛高速; traditional Chinese: 海南環島高速; lit. 'Hainan ring around the island expressway'), officially the Hainan Region Ring Expressway (simplified Chinese: 海南地区环岛线高速公路; traditional Chinese: 海南地區環島線高速公路) and designated G98, is a 612.8-kilometre-long orbital expressway (380.8 mi) that encircles the island of Hainan in the People's Republic of China.

== History ==
In August 2010, the expressway was formed from the amalgamation of parts from four different expressways:

- Hainan East Line Expressway (Chinese: 海南东线高速公路), traversing the eastern portion of the island. Leftover was a small section north of the Longqiao interchange, which was redesignated S81 and named the Haikou Connecting Line (Chinese: 海口联路线).
- Hainan West Line Expressway (Chinese: 海南西线高速公路), traversing the western portion of the island, along the coast
- Haikou Ring Expressway (Chinese: 海口绕城高速公路), which previously served as a bypass of the city center of Haikou. Leftover was a small section east of the Longqiao interchange, connecting the expressway network to Haikou Meilan International Airport, which was not included in the new designation, and was renamed the Meilan Airport Connecting Line (Chinese: 美兰机场联络线) and redesignated S82.
- Sanya Ring Expressway (Chinese: 三亚绕城高速公路), which previously served as a bypass of the city center of Sanya.

As part of this amalgamation, the kilometre zero marker of the expressway was set at the Longqiao interchange in Haikou's Longhua District, with numbers increasing clockwise along the expressway.

== Route ==
The Hainan Ring Expressway forms an orbital route that traverses the island of Hainan. The expressway follows much of the coast of the island, except for a section in the east between Haikou and Qionghai, which takes a more inward and direct route. The G9812 Haikou–Qionghai Expressway, which is partially complete, uses the coastal route for this stretch.

The Hainan Ring Expressway is currently not connected to any other national-level expressways in China. A bridge is currently being planned from Hainan to Mainland China, over the Qiongzhou Strait. This would connect the Hainan Ring Expressway with the G15 Shenyang–Haikou Expressway and G75 Lanzhou–Haikou Expressway concurrently, which would provide a connection to the rest of the expressway system in China.

A section of the expressway between the Longqiao interchange in Haikou and the Bailian interchange in Chengmai County, originally part of the Haikou Ring Expressway, is concurrent with the G9801 Haikou Ring Expressway.

=== Eastern route ===
The eastern portion, formerly known as the Hainan East Line Expressway, traverses through the following administrative divisions from north to south:

- Haikou
- Ding'an County
- Qionghai
- Wanning
- Lingshui Li Autonomous County
- Sanya

=== Western route ===
The western portion, formerly known as the Hainan West Line Expressway, traverses through the following cities from north to south:

- Haikou
- Chengmai County
- Lingao County
- Danzhou
- Changjiang Li Autonomous County
- Dongfang
- Ledong Li Autonomous County
- Sanya
