= Longcang Township, Qinghai =

Lungsang Township 龙藏乡 · ལུང་བཟང་ཞང་། Longzang, Longcang
- Township
- Location in Qinghai
- Coordinates: 35°16′46″N 100°4′31″E
- Country: China
- Province: Qinghai
- Autonomous prefecture: Hainan
- County: Xinghai
- Village-level divisions: 7

Area
  - Total: 869.9 km^{2} (335.9 sq mi)

Population (2010)
  - Total: 5,916
  - Density: 6.801/km^{2} (17.61/sq mi)
- Time zone: UTC+8 (China Standard)
- Local dialing code: 974

Lungsang Township (Tibetan: ལུང་བཟང་ཞང་།) also known as Longzang Township (Chinese: 龙藏乡; pinyin: Lóngzàng Xiāng) or Longcang Township is a township under the jurisdiction of Xinghai County, Hainan Tibetan Autonomous Prefecture, Qinghai, China. Lungsang Township's is bordered by Zhongtü Township to its east, Maqên County and Qimuqu River (切木曲) to its south, Qukoi Township to its west and Qu'ngoin town to its north. In 2010, Lungsang Township had a total population of 5,916 people: 3,010 males and 2,906 females: 1,844 under 14 years old, 3,782 aged between 15 and 64 and 290 over 65 years old. Lungsang Township has jurisdiction over the following villages:

- Sairiba Village (赛日巴村)
- Langqing Village (浪青村)
- Sangshidou Village (桑什斗村)
- Muguo Village (木果村)
- Marimao Village (麻日毛村)
- Rixu Village (日旭村)
- Nadong Village (那洞村)
