= Shilu =

Shilu is the Pinyin transcription of several Chinese words and proper names. It may refer to:

- Shilu, Hainan (石碌镇), a town in Hainan Island.
- Shilu, Suzhou (lit. Stone Road, 石路), a business street in Suzhou
- Veritable Records, historical records of Chinese imperial administrations
- Shi Lu (石鲁), Chinese painter
- Shilu (Jurchen) (石魯), Jurchen chieftain in the Liao dynasty

== Shilu station ==
- Shi Lu station (石路站) of the Suzhou Metro in Suzhou, Jiangsu Province, China.
- Shilu railway station (石碌站) on a branch of Hainan western ring railway, in Shilu, Hainan Province, China.
- Fengcheng 10 Lu station (凤城十路站) or Fengcheng Shi Lu station, in Xi'an, Shaanxi Province, China.
