= Quercus bawanglingensis =

Conservation status
- Critically Endangered (IUCN 3.1)

Scientific classification
- Kingdom: Plantae
- Clade: Embryophytes
- Clade: Tracheophytes
- Clade: Spermatophytes
- Clade: Angiosperms
- Clade: Eudicots
- Clade: Rosids
- Order: Fagales
- Family: Fagaceae
- Genus: Quercus
- Subgenus: Quercus subg. Cerris
- Section: Quercus sect. Ilex
- Species: Q. bawanglingensis

Binomial name
- Quercus bawanglingensis C.C.Huang, Ze X.Li & F.W.Xing (1996)

Species of oak

Quercus bawanglingensis is a species of oak. It is an evergreen tree native to the island of Hainan in southern China.

The species belongs to Quercus section Ilex, and is closely related to Q. tarokoensis of Taiwan.

Quercus bawanglingensis is known only from a single population in Bawangling in the Changjiang Li Autonomous County of Hainan, where it grows in tropical montane dwarf forests from 900 to 1000 meters elevation. There are estimated to be only 20 mature trees in the wild, and it is threatened with habitat loss from forest clearance.
