= G98 =

G98 may refer to:

- Gewehr 98, a German bolt action Mauser rifle
- G98 Hainan Island Ring Expressway, an expressway in the Chinese province of Hainan
- Codename for the GeForce 9 series of GPUs
