= China National Highway 229 =

National highway in China

National Highway 229
- 229国道

Major junctions
- From: Raohe, Heilongjiang
- To: Gaizhou, Liaoning

Location
- Country: China

Highway system
- National Trunk Highway System; Primary; Auxiliary
← G228	→ G230

China National Highway 229 (229国道) runs from Raohe, Heilongjiang to Gaizhou, Liaoning. It runs southwest from Raohe towards Gaizhou.
