= China National Highway 671 =

Highway in China

National Highway 671
- 671国道

Route information
- Length: 74.202 km (46.107 mi)

Major junctions
- From: Heshui County, Gansu
- To: Huachi County, Gansu

Location
- Country: China

Highway system
- National Trunk Highway System; Primary; Auxiliary
← G670	→ G672

China National Highway 671, also known as the Heshui-Huachi Highway, is a highway under construction in China. The highway connects Heshui County and Huachi County in Gansu. Construction on the highway began on 13 May 2022.
