= Heka =

Heka may refer to:

- Heka (god), the deification of magic and medicine in ancient Egypt
- Heka, Qinghai, a town in China
- Lambda Orionis, a star in the constellation of Orion, also known by the traditional names "Meissa" and "Heka"
- Heka Nanai (born 1988), Australian rugby league footballer
- Etelka Kenéz Heka (1936–2024), Hungarian writer, poet and singer
- Tutuli Heka, Niuean politician
- Donna Heka, a fictional character in the television series Shortland Street
- Heka, an AMD Phenom II processor core
