= National highways of China =

National network of trunk roads in mainland China

China National Highways
- CNH (Guodao) trunk road marker

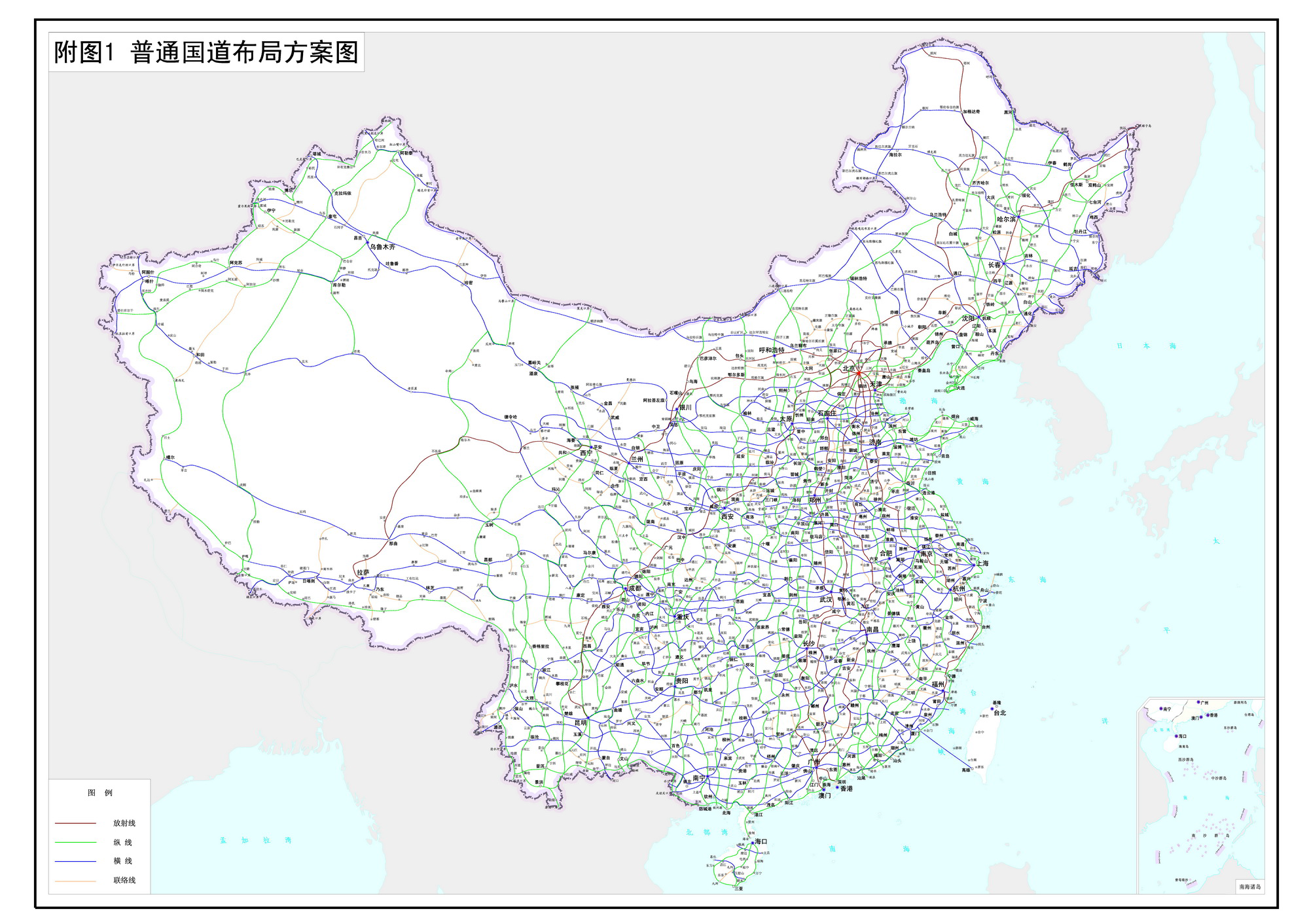
- Official CNH Trunk roads in China

Highway names
- CNH: GXXX (red)

System links
- National Trunk Highway System; Primary; Auxiliary

The China National Highways (CNH/Guodao) (simplified Chinese: 中华人民共和国国道; traditional Chinese: 中華人民共和國國道; pinyin: Zhōnghuá Rénmín Gònghéguó Guódào) is a network of trunk roads across mainland China. Established to facilitate transportation and economic development, the system includes north–south and east–west arterial highways, expressways, and local roads. By 2024, the network encompasses over 1.9 million kilometers of highways, making it one of the most extensive in the world. Key milestones include the completion of major expressways by 2008 and ongoing expansions to enhance connectivity, especially in western and less developed areas.

Apart from the expressways of China that were planned and constructed later, most of the CNH are not controlled-access highways.

== History ==
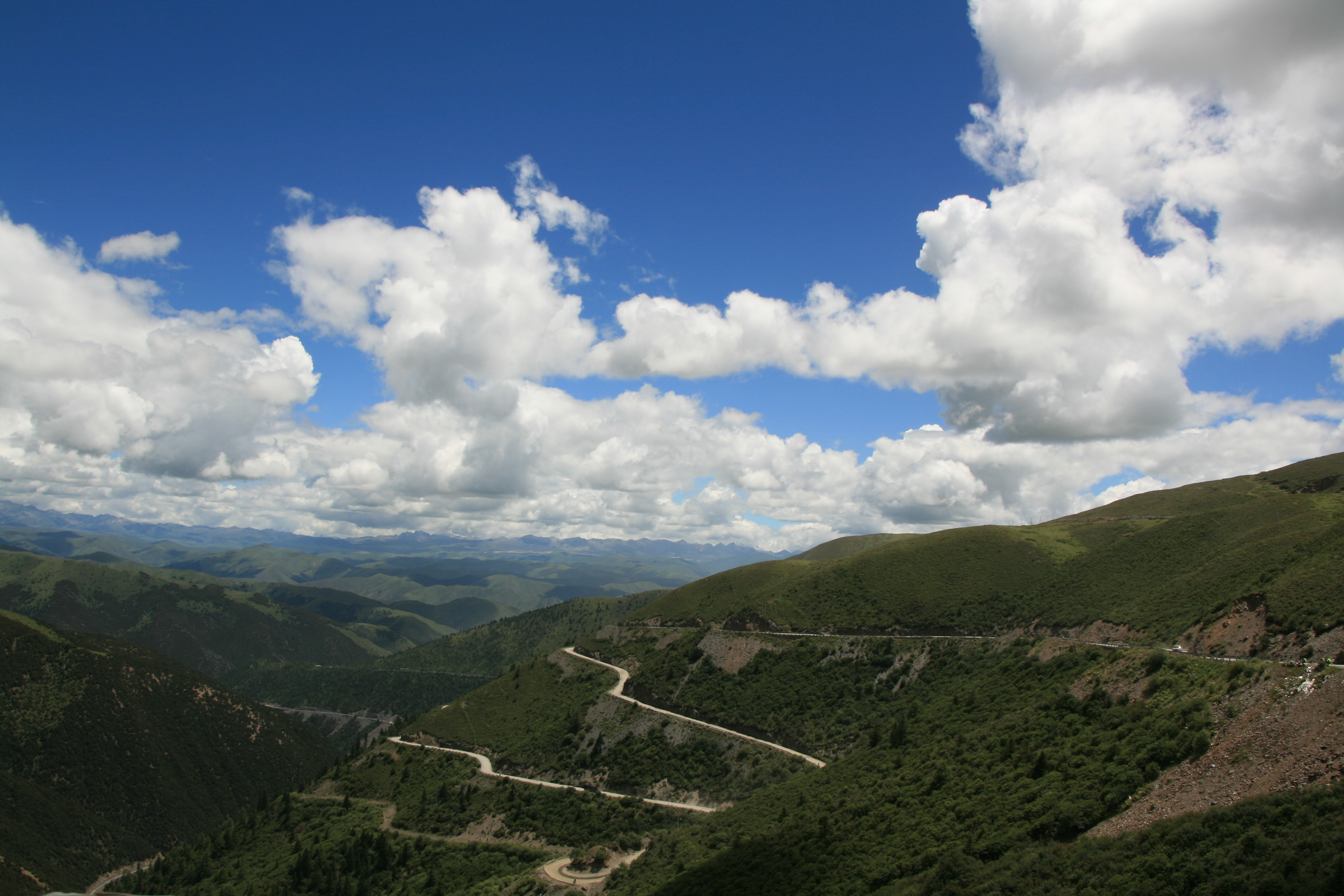
China National Highway 318 between Yajiang and Kangding, Sichuan

The building of highways is seen as key to accelerating infrastructure construction. In 2003, completed investment in highway construction was 350 billion yuan and 219 key highway projects progressed, focusing mainly on the five north–south and seven east–west national arterial highways as well as highways in western China and in rural areas. By the end of 2004, the total length of highways open to traffic reached 1.871 million km, including 34,300 km (21,300 mi) of expressways up to advanced modern transportation standard, ranking second in the world. The nation's highway density was 19.5 km per 100 km^{2}. With the completion in 2008 of the five north–south and the seven east–west national arterial highways, totaling 35,000 km (22,000 mi), Beijing and Shanghai were linked by major highways, chiefly expressways, to the capitals of all provinces and autonomous regions of China, creating highway connections between over 200 cities.

The aim of the National Expressway Network Plan approved in early 2005 is an expressway system connecting all capitals of provinces and autonomous regions with Beijing and with each other, linking major cities and important counties. The network will have a total length of about 85,000 km (53,000 mi), including seven originating in Beijing; the Beijing-Shanghai, Beijing-Taipei, Beijing-Hong Kong-Macau, Beijing-Kunming, Beijing-Lhasa, Beijing-Ürümqi, and Beijing-Harbin expressways. Half of the projects are already completed.

In 2013 the Ministry of Transport announced the "National Highway Network Planning (2013 – 2030)", which will bring the total number of highways to 119, with 81 connecting highways between them. The total mileage will be increased to 265,000 km (165,000 mi), with increased focus on the western and less developed regions.

In 2022, the NDRC and MOT published a new National Highway Network Plan (Chinese: 国家公路网规划), which added and re-formed several expressways and national highways. The plan aims for all national highways to connect all county-level (or above) administrative regions (except those that are parts of Sansha), important national tourist attractions, and border checkpoints.

== Regulation ==
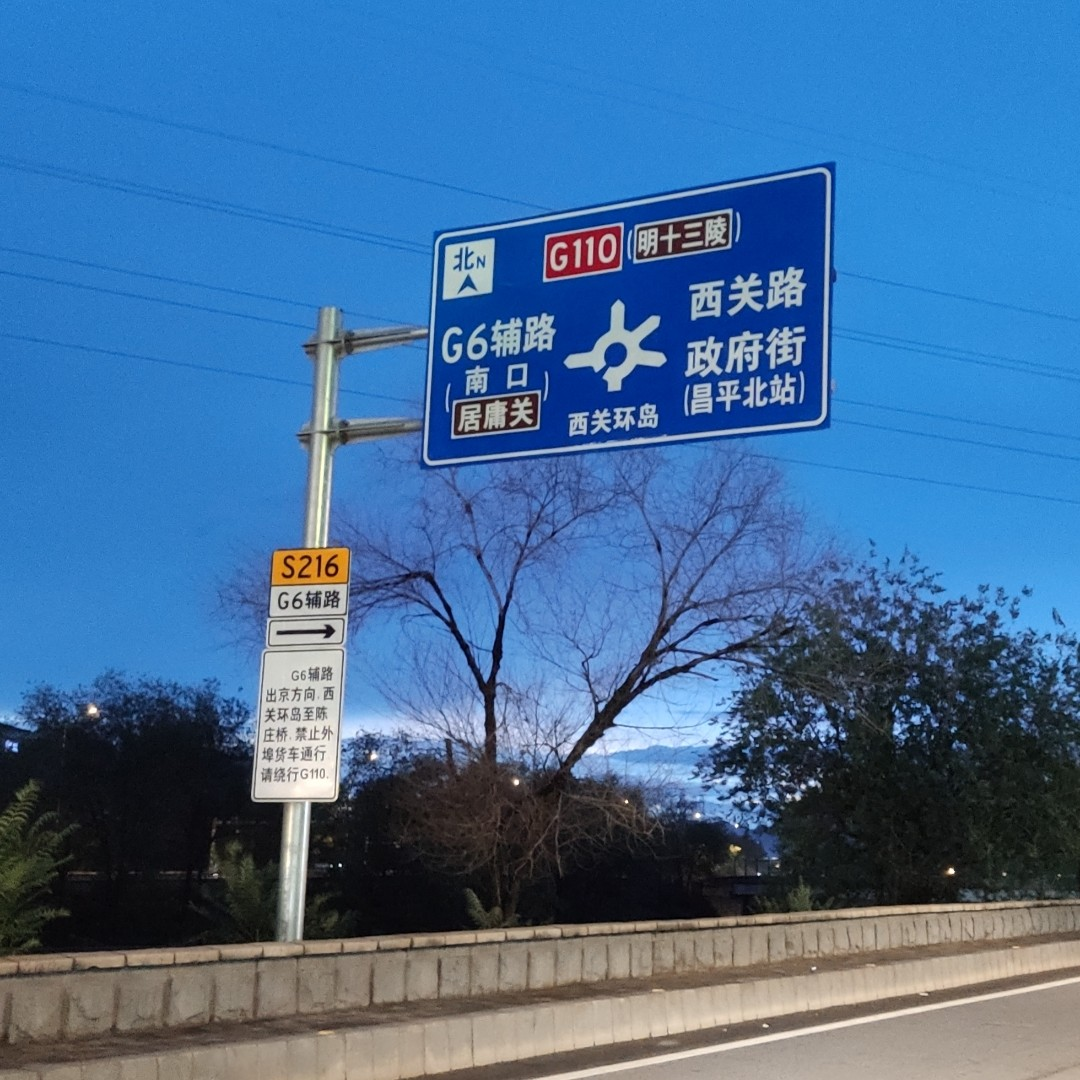
Roundabout sign on China National Highway 110, Changping District, Beijing

The speed limit on China National Highways is 80 km/h (50 mph), on sections with more than one lane per direction it may be up to 110 km/h (68 mph).

Nationwide highways often begin with the letter G, followed by three numerals, e.g.: G107. It is said that the G stands for 国家 (guójiā), or national.

The numbering of the highways is as follows:

- Five vertical and seven horizontal main routes were labelled in the former 000 series (the so-called "five downs and seven acrosses"), although these have been deprecated in favour of the "NTHS" (7, 11, 18) system.
- Highways in the 100 series (e.g. 102, 106) begin from Beijing – the capital city of the People's Republic of China – and spread out in all compass directions, except for China National Highway 112, which originates in Bazhou as it is a ring road around Jingjinji.
- Highways in the 200 series stretch from north to south (e.g., from Hohhot in Inner Mongolia through to Beihai in Guangxi province);
- Highways in the 300 series stretch from east to west (e.g., from Shanghai through to Ruili in Yunnan province);
- Highways in the 500, 600 and 700 series are connecting roads between other national highways.

In major cities, there is usually a gap in the road within the city.

== List of all China National Highways ==
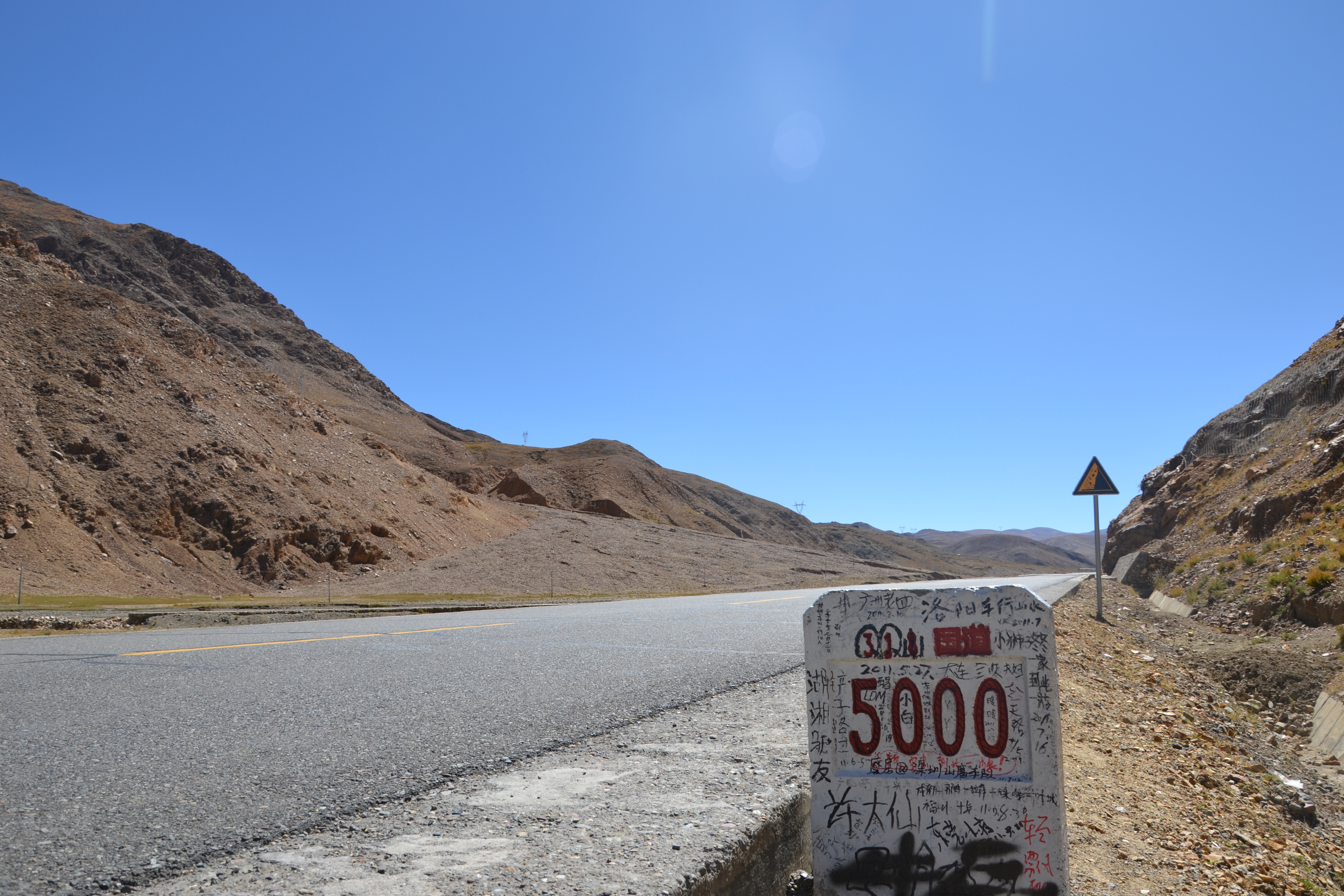
5000 kilometer milestone on G318, the longest China National Highway, in Lhatse County, Tibet.

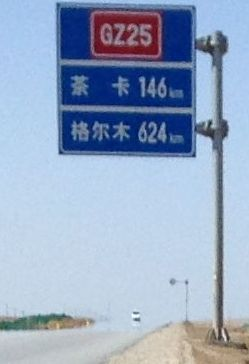
Road sign using the old GZXX format

=== Former 000 Series ===
Note: 000 Series China National Highways pointed to five specific vertical routes, as well as seven specific horizontal routes. Routes ending in "0" were north–south (vertical) routes; routes ending in "5" were east–west (horizontal) routes. The new system with two to four numbers that indicate the "NTHS" (7918) system is now in use instead of the 000 Series. For the expressways named under the new numbering system, see Expressways of China.

It seems that the old 0xx numbers are still signposted using the format GZXX, e.g. in the Qinghai province, there are signs at the G109 (old G025) showing the number GZ25.

Number	Name	English name	Start point	End point	Length	Status	Notes
G010	010国道	China National Highway 010	Tongjiang	Sanya	5,700 km (3,500 mi)	Redesignated	Was the longest China National Highway overall. Now G1011 and part of G1, G15, G1503 and G98.
G015	015国道	China National Highway 015	Suifenhe	Manzhouli	2,540 km (1,580 mi)	Redesignated	Now G10.
G020	020国道	China National Highway 020	Beijing	Fuzhou	2,540 km (1,580 mi)	Redesignated	Now part of G3.
G025	025国道	China National Highway 025	Dandong	Lhasa	4,590 km (2,850 mi)	Redesignated	Now part of G1113, G1 and G6.
G030	030国道	China National Highway 030	Beijing	Zhuhai	2,310 km (1,440 mi)	Redesignated	Now part of G4 and G0425.
G035	035国道	China National Highway 035	Qingdao	Yinchuan	1,610 km (1,000 mi)	Redesignated	Now G20.
G040	040国道	China National Highway 040	Erenhot	Hekou	3,610 km (2,240 mi)	Redesignated	Now part of G55, G5 and G80, and all of G8011.
G045	045国道	China National Highway 045	Lianyungang	Khorgas	3,980 km (2,470 mi)	Redesignated	Now G30.
G050	050国道	China National Highway 050	Chongqing	Zhanjiang	1,430 km (890 mi)	Redesignated	Now part of G15 and G75.
G055	055国道	China National Highway 055	Shanghai	Chengdu	2,970 km (1,850 mi)	Redesignated	Now G42.
G065	065国道	China National Highway 065	Shanghai	Ruili	4,090 km (2,540 mi)	Redesignated	Now G60 and part of G56.
G075	075国道	China National Highway 075	Hengyang	Kunming	1,980 km (1,230 mi)	Redesignated	Now part of G72, G80 and G78.

=== Current series ===
Number	Name	English Name	Start point	End point	Current Length	Status	Notes
100 Series
	101国道	China National Highway 101	Beijing, BJ	Shenyang, LN	909 km (565 mi)	Completed	Known as S35 in Beijing
	102国道	China National Highway 102	Beijing, BJ	Heixiazi Island, Fuyuan, HL	2,097 km (1,303 mi)	Completed	
	103国道	China National Highway 103	Beijing, BJ	Binhai, TJ	163 km (101 mi)	Completed	The shortest China National Highway from Beijing.
	104国道	China National Highway 104	Beijing, BJ	Pingtan, FJ	2,606 km (1,619 mi)	Completed	
	105国道	China National Highway 105	Beijing, BJ	Macau, MO	2,717 km (1,688 mi)	Partial	
	106国道	China National Highway 106	Beijing, BJ	Guangzhou, GD	2,476 km (1,539 mi)	Completed	
	107国道	China National Highway 107	Beijing, BJ	Hong Kong, HK	2,658 km (1,652 mi)	Partial	
	108国道	China National Highway 108	Beijing, BJ	Kunming, YN	3,356 km (2,085 mi)	Completed	
	109国道	China National Highway 109	Beijing, BJ	Lhasa, XZ	3,922 km (2,437 mi)	Completed	The longest China National Highway from Beijing. Includes the Qinghai-Tibet Highway.
	110国道	China National Highway 110	Beijing, BJ	Qingtongxia, NX	1,426 km (886 mi)	Partial	
	111国道	China National Highway 111	Beijing, BJ	port of Mohe, HL	2,717 km (1,688 mi)	Completed	
	112国道	China National Highway 112	Bazhou, HE		1,228 km (763 mi)	Completed	Ring road around Beijing. Planned in 2013 as Gaobedian-Gaobedian
200 Series
	201国道	China National Highway 201	Hegang, HL	Dalian, LN	1,964 km (1,220 mi)	Completed	
	202国道	China National Highway 202	Heihe, HL	Dalian, LN	1,818 km (1,130 mi)	Completed	
	203国道	China National Highway 203	Suihua, HL	Shenyang, LN	720 km (450 mi)	Partial	
	204国道	China National Highway 204	Yantai, SD	Shanghai, SH	1,031 km (641 mi)	Completed	
	205国道	China National Highway 205	Shanhaiguan, HE	Shenzhen, GD	3,160 km (1,960 mi)	Partial	
	206国道	China National Highway 206	Weihai, SD	Shantou, GD	2,375 km (1,476 mi)	Partial	
	207国道	China National Highway 207	Ulanhot, NM	Hai'an, GD	3,738 km (2,323 mi)	Partial	The longest north-south China National Highway.
	208国道	China National Highway 208	Erenhot, NM	Xichuan, HA	990 km (620 mi)	Partial	
	209国道	China National Highway 209	Sonid Left Banner, NM	Beihai, GX	3,435 km (2,134 mi)	Partial	
	210国道	China National Highway 210	Mandula port, DMU Banner, NM	Fangchenggang, GX	3,097 km (1,924 mi)	Partial	
	211国道	China National Highway 211	Yinchuan, NX	Rongjiang, GZ	691 km (429 mi)	Partial	
	212国道	China National Highway 212	Lanzhou, GS	port of Longbang, GX	1,302 km (809 mi)	Partial	
	213国道	China National Highway 213	port of Ceke, NM	port of Mohan, YN	2,877 km (1,788 mi)	Partial	
	214国道	China National Highway 214	Xining, QH	Lancang, YN	3,256 km (2,023 mi)	Partial	
	215国道	China National Highway 215	port of Mazongshan, GS	Ning'er, YN	641 km (398 mi)	Partial	
	216国道	China National Highway 216	Hongshanzui port, Fuhai, XJ	port of Gyirong, XZ	857 km (533 mi)	Partial	
	217国道	China National Highway 217	Altay, XJ	Tashkurgan, XJ	1,753 km (1,089 mi)	Partial	
	218国道	China National Highway 218	port of Khorgas, XJ	Ruoqiang, XJ	1,067 km (663 mi)	Partial	
	219国道	China National Highway 219	Kanas, XJ	Dongxing, GX	2,086 km (1,296 mi)	Partial	Will become the longest China National Highway overall.
	220国道	China National Highway 220	Dongying, SD	Shenzhen, GD	585 km (364 mi)	Partial	
	221国道	China National Highway 221	Tongjiang, HL	Harbin, HL	668 km (415 mi)	Completed	
	222国道	China National Highway 222	port of Jiayin, HL	Linjiang, JL	363 km (226 mi)	Partial	
	223国道	China National Highway 223	Haikou, HI	Yulin Port, Sanya, HI	323 km (201 mi)	Completed	Eastern route, via Qionghai, Wanning, Lingshui. It is the eastern part of Hainan Ring Highway.
	224国道	China National Highway 224	Haikou, HI	Yulin Port, Sanya, HI	309 km (192 mi)	Completed	Middle route, via Tunchang, Qiongzhong, Wuzhishan, the shortest north-south China National Highway.
	225国道	China National Highway 225	Haikou, HI	Yulin Port, Sanya, HI	429 km (267 mi)	Completed	Western route, via Chengmai, Danzhou, Changjiang, Dongfang.
	226国道	China National Highway 226	Chuxiong	Mojiang	288 km (179 mi)	Abandoned	Planned but cancelled. Eventually built as S218.
	227国道	China National Highway 227	Zhangye, GS	port of Menglian, YN	347 km (216 mi)	Completed	
	228国道	China National Highway 228	Taipei		956 km (594 mi)	Abandoned	Hypothetical highway in Taiwan, remaining outside of PRC's control
	228国道	China National Highway 228	Dandong, LN	Dongxing, GX		Partial	
	229国道	China National Highway 229	Raohe, HL	Gaizhou, LN		Planned	
	230国道	China National Highway 230	Tonghua, JL	Wuhan, HB		Planned	
	231国道	China National Highway 231	Nenjiang, HL	Shuangliao, JL		Planned	
	232国道	China National Highway 232	Boketu, Yakeshi, NM	Siping, JL		Planned	
	233国道	China National Highway 233	Hexigten, NM	Huangshan, AH		Planned	
	234国道	China National Highway 234	Xinglong, HE	Yangjiang, GD		Planned	
	235国道	China National Highway 235	Xinyi, JS	Haifeng, GD		Planned	
	236国道	China National Highway 236	Wuhu, AH	Zhelang, Shanwei, GD		Planned	
	237国道	China National Highway 237	Jining, SD	Ningde, FJ		Planned	
	238国道	China National Highway 238	Nanchang, JX	Huilai, GD		Planned	
	239国道	China National Highway 239	Sanggendalai, Zhenglan, NM	Yangquan, SX		Planned	
	240国道	China National Highway 240	Baoding, HE	Taishan, GD		Planned	
	241国道	China National Highway 241	Horinger, Hohhot, NM	Beihai, GX		Planned	
	242国道	China National Highway 242	Ganqimaodu port, Urad MB, NM	Qinzhou port, GX		Planned	
	243国道	China National Highway 243	Kaizhou, CQ	Pingxiang, GX		Planned	
	244国道	China National Highway 244	Wuhai, NM	Jiangjin, CQ		Partial	
	245国道	China National Highway 245	Bazhong, SC	Lüchun, YN		Partial	endpoint changed from Jinping to Lüchun in 2022
	246国道	China National Highway 246	Suining, SC	Malipo, YN		Planned	
	247国道	China National Highway 247	Jingtai, GS	Zhaotong, YN		Partial	
	248国道	China National Highway 248	Lanzhou, GS	Maguan, YN		Partial	
300 Series
	301国道	China National Highway 301	Suifenhe, HL	port of Manzhouli, NM	1,680 km (1,040 mi)	Completed	
	302国道	China National Highway 302	Fangchuan, Hunchun, JL	Arxan, NM	1,028 km (639 mi)	Partial	
	303国道	China National Highway 303	Ji'an, JL	Abag Banner, NM	1,263 km (785 mi)	Partial	
	304国道	China National Highway 304	Dandong, LN	Holingol, NM	889 km (552 mi)	Completed	
	305国道	China National Highway 305	Zhuanghe, LN	Bayanhua, W. Ujimqin Banner, NM	815 km (506 mi)	Partial	
	306国道	China National Highway 306	Suizhong port, LN	Zhu'engadabuqi port, E. Ujimqin, NM	497 km (309 mi)	Partial	
	307国道	China National Highway 307	Huanghua port, HE	Shandan, GS	1,351 km (839 mi)	Partial	
	308国道	China National Highway 308	Wendeng, SD	Shijiazhuang, HE	637 km (396 mi)	Partial	
	309国道	China National Highway 309	Qingdao, SD	Lanzhou, GS	2,208 km (1,372 mi)	Completed	
	310国道	China National Highway 310	Lianyungang, JS	Gonghe, QH	1,613 km (1,002 mi)	Partial	
	311国道	China National Highway 311	Lianyun, Lianyungang, JS	Luanchuan, HA	748 km (465 mi)	Partial	
	312国道	China National Highway 312	Shanghai, SH	port of Khorgas, XJ	4,967 km (3,086 mi)	Completed	
	313国道	China National Highway 313	Guazhou	Ruoqiang	821 km (510 mi)	Abandoned	Now part of S314, G215 and S313, as well as partially abandoned.
	314国道	China National Highway 314	Ürümqi, XJ	port of Khunjerab, XJ	1,948 km (1,210 mi)	Completed	Includes the Chinese part of the Karakoram Highway.
	315国道	China National Highway 315	Xining, QH	port of Torugart, XJ	3,063 km (1,903 mi)	Partial	
	316国道	China National Highway 316	Zhanggang, Changle, FJ	Tongren, QH	2,915 km (1,811 mi)	Partial	
	317国道	China National Highway 317	Chengdu, SC	Gar, XZ	2,043 km (1,269 mi)	Partial	
	318国道	China National Highway 318	Minhang, Shanghai, SH	Zhangmu port, Nyalam, XZ	5,476 km (3,403 mi)	Completed	
	319国道	China National Highway 319	Xiamen, FJ	Chengdu, SC	2,984 km (1,854 mi)	Partial	Officially is to start at Kaohsiung, Taiwan
	320国道	China National Highway 320	Shanghai, SH	Ruili, YN	3,695 km (2,296 mi)	Completed	
	321国道	China National Highway 321	Guangzhou, GD	Chengdu, SC	2,220 km (1,380 mi)	Completed	
	322国道	China National Highway 322	Rui'an, ZJ	port of Youyiguan, YN	1,039 km (646 mi)	Partial	
	323国道	China National Highway 323	Ruijin, JX	Qingshuihe port, Gengma, YN	2,915 km (1,811 mi)	Completed	
	324国道	China National Highway 324	Fuzhou, FJ	Kunming, YN	2,712 km (1,685 mi)	Completed	
	325国道	China National Highway 325	Guangzhou, GD	Nanning, GX	868 km (539 mi)	Completed	
	326国道	China National Highway 326	Xiushan, CQ	port of Hekou, YN	1,562 km (971 mi)	Completed	
	327国道	China National Highway 327	Lianyungang, JS	Guyuan, NX	2,024 km (1,258 mi)	Partial	
	328国道	China National Highway 328	Yinyang, Qidong, JS	Laohekou, HB	224 km (139 mi)	Partial	The shortest east-west China National Highway.
	329国道	China National Highway 329	Putuo, Zhoushan, ZJ	Lushan, HA	292 km (181 mi)	Partial	
	330国道	China National Highway 330	Dongtou, ZJ	Feixi, Hefei, AH	327 km (203 mi)	Partial	
	331国道	China National Highway 331	Dandong, LN	Aheitubieke port, Altay, XJ		Partial	
	332国道	China National Highway 332	port of Luobei, HL	Ebuduge port, NBL Banner, NM		Planned	
	333国道	China National Highway 333	port of Sanhe, JL	Morin Dawa Banner, NM		Planned	
	334国道	China National Highway 334	Kaishantun port, Longjing, JL	E. Ujimqin Banner. NM		Planned	
	335国道	China National Highway 335	Chengde, HE	Baketu port, Tacheng, XJ		Planned	
	336国道	China National Highway 336	Binhai, TJ	Shenmu, SN		Partial	
	337国道	China National Highway 337	Huanghua port, HE	Yulin, SN		Planned	
	338国道	China National Highway 338	Haixing, HE	Tianjun, QH		Planned	
	339国道	China National Highway 339	Binzhou port, SD	Yulin, SN		Planned	
	340国道	China National Highway 340	Dongying port, SD	Zichang, SN		Planned	
	341国道	China National Highway 341	Huangdao, SD	Haiyan, QH		Partial	startpoint changed from Jiaonan to Huangdao in 2022
	342国道	China National Highway 342	Rizhao port, SD	Fengxian, SN		Partial	
	343国道	China National Highway 343	Dafeng, JS	Lushi, HA		Planned	
	344国道	China National Highway 344	Dongtai, JS	Lingwu, NX		Partial	
	345国道	China National Highway 345	Yinyang, Qidong, JS	Nagqu, XZ	3,160 km (1,960 mi)	Planned	
	346国道	China National Highway 346	Shanghai, SH	Ankang, SN		Planned	
	347国道	China National Highway 347	Nanjing, JS	Delingha, QH		Planned	
	348国道	China National Highway 348	Wuhan, HB	Dali, YN		Planned	
	349国道	China National Highway 349	Markam, XZ	Saga, XZ		Planned	startpoint changed from Zhag'yab to Markam in 2022
	350国道	China National Highway 350	Lichuan, HB	Luhuo, SC		Planned	
	351国道	China National Highway 351	Taizhou port, ZJ	Dawei, Xiaojin, SC		Partial	
	352国道	China National Highway 352	Zhangjiajie, HN	Qiaojia, YN		Planned	
	353国道	China National Highway 353	Ningde, FJ	Dulongjiang, Gongshan, YN	3,797 km (2,359 mi)	Planned	endpoint changed from Fugong to Gongshan in 2022
	354国道	China National Highway 354	Nanchang, JX	Xingyi, GZ		Planned	
	355国道	China National Highway 355	Fuzhou, FJ	Bama, GX		Planned	
	356国道	China National Highway 356	Meizhou, FJ	Xichang, SC		Planned	
	357国道	China National Highway 357	Dongshan, FJ	Lushui, YN		Planned	
	358国道	China National Highway 358	Shishi, FJ	port of Shuikou, GX		Planned	
	359国道	China National Highway 359	Foshan, GD	Funing, YN		Planned	
	360国道	China National Highway 360	Longlou, Wenchang, HI	Lingao, HI		Planned	
	361国道	China National Highway 361	Lingshui, HI	Changhua, Changjiang, HI		Planned	
500 Series
	501国道	China National Highway 501	Jixian, HL	Dangbi port, Mishan, HL		Planned	
	502国道	China National Highway 502	Kedong, HL	Qiqihar, HL		Planned	
	503国道	China National Highway 503	Wuchang, HL	Tongyu, JL		Planned	
	504国道	China National Highway 504	Manjiang, Fusong, JL	Gongzhuling, JL		Planned	
	505国道	China National Highway 505	Xifeng, LN	Naiman Banner, NM		Planned	startpoint changed from Kaiyuan to Xifeng in 2022
	506国道	China National Highway 506	Ji'an, JL	Benxi, LN		Planned	
	507国道	China National Highway 507	Changhai, LN	Changxing Island, LN		Planned	
	508国道	China National Highway 508	Xiaochengzi, Chifeng, NM	Caofeidian port, HE		Planned	
	509国道	China National Highway 509	Port of Jingtang, HE	Tongzhou, BJ		Planned	
	510国道	China National Highway 510	Pailou, Weichang, HE	Qahar Right Rear Banner, NM		Planned	
	511国道	China National Highway 511	Sonid Right Banner, NM	Zhangbei, HE		Planned	
	512国道	China National Highway 512	Wanquan, HE	Dalad Banner, NM		Planned	
	513国道	China National Highway 513	Linyi, SD	Dezhou, SD		Planned	
	514国道	China National Highway 514	Qihe, SD	Handan, HE		Planned	
	515国道	China National Highway 515	Dingzhou, HE	Xunxian, HA		Planned	
	516国道	China National Highway 516	Zhanhua, SD	Qingzhou, SD		Planned	
	517国道	China National Highway 517	Penglai, SD	Laixi, SD		Planned	startpoint changed from Changdao to Penglai in 2022
	518国道	China National Highway 518	Lanshan port, Rizhao, SD	Dingtao, SD		Planned	
	519国道	China National Highway 519	Yushe, SX	Lucheng, SX		Planned	
	520国道	China National Highway 520	Linfen, SX	Yan'an, SN		Planned	
	521国道	China National Highway 521	Yuncheng, SX	Tongguan, SN		Planned	
	522国道	China National Highway 522	Yuanqu, SX	Tongguan, SN		Planned	
	523国道	China National Highway 523	Taizhou, JS	Danyang, JS		Planned	
	524国道	China National Highway 524	Changshu, JS	Haining, ZJ		Planned	
	525国道	China National Highway 525	Pinghu, ZJ	Hangzhou, ZJ		Planned	
	526国道	China National Highway 526	Shengsi Connecting Road			Planned	Shengsi-Zhoushan
	527国道	China National Highway 527	Xiangshan, ZJ	Lanxi, ZJ		Planned	endpoint changed from Yiwu to Lanxi in 2022
	528国道	China National Highway 528	Longyou, ZJ	Guangchang, JX		Planned	
	529国道	China National Highway 529	Jinzhai, AH	Yuexi, AH		Planned	
	530国道	China National Highway 530	Huangshan, AH	Hukou, JX		Planned	
	531国道	China National Highway 531	Duchang Connecting Road			Planned	
	532国道	China National Highway 532	Jiujiang, JX	Gongqingcheng, JX		Planned	endpoint changed from De'an to Gongqingcheng in 2022
	533国道	China National Highway 533	Zhangshu, JX	Fenyi, JX		Planned	
	534国道	China National Highway 534	Changle, FJ	Wuping, FJ		Planned	changed from Fuqing-Changting to Changle-Wuping in 2022
	535国道	China National Highway 535	Dingnan, JX	Yizhang, HN		Planned	
	536国道	China National Highway 536	Pingjiang, HN	Xupu, HN		Planned	startpoint changed from Taojiang to Pingjiang in 2022
	537国道	China National Highway 537	Ningyuan, HN	Lianzhou, GD		Planned	
	538国道	China National Highway 538	Jiangyong, HN	Zhongshan, GX		Planned	
	539国道	China National Highway 539	Jiedong, GD	Nan'ao, GD		Planned	
	540国道	China National Highway 540	Maoyang, Wuzhishan, HI	Jiusuo, Ledong, HI		Planned	
	541国道	China National Highway 541	Shiquan, SN	Wuxi, CQ		Planned	
	542国道	China National Highway 542	Guangyuan, SC	Wanzhou, CQ		Partial	
	543国道	China National Highway 543	Shazhou, Qingchuan, SC	Nanba, Pingwu, SC		Planned	
	544国道	China National Highway 544	Jiuzhaigou, SC	Chuanzhusi, Songpan, SC		Planned	
	545国道	China National Highway 545	Maoxian, SC	Deyang, SC		Planned	
	546国道	China National Highway 546	Naxi, SC	Xishui, GZ		Planned	
	547国道	China National Highway 547	Yibin, SC	Xingwen, SC		Planned	
	548国道	China National Highway 548	Banma, QH	Wengda, Sêrtar, SC		Planned	
	549国道	China National Highway 549	Shimian, SC	Dêrong, SC		Planned	
	550国道	China National Highway 550	Siji, Yuexi, SC	Lugu, Mianning, SC		Planned	
	551国道	China National Highway 551	Qingxi, Zhenyuan, GZ	Fuquan, GZ		Partial	
	552国道	China National Highway 552	Libo, GZ	Anlong, GZ		Planned	
	553国道	China National Highway 553	Mengzi, YN	Yuanjiang, YN		Planned	
	554国道	China National Highway 554	Yongsheng, YN	Xiangyun, YN		Planned	
	555国道	China National Highway 555	Shidian Connecting Road			Planned	Yongde-Baoshan
	556国道	China National Highway 556	Zhen'an, Longling, YN	port of Ruili, YN		Planned	startpoint changed from Zhen'an to Longling in 2022
	557国道	China National Highway 557	Gonjo Connecting Road			Planned	Jiangda-Zhag'yab
	558国道	China National Highway 558	Biru, XZ	Banbar, XZ		Planned	
	559国道	China National Highway 559	Zayü, XZ	Mêdog, XZ		Planned	
	560国道	China National Highway 560	Mainling, XZ	Cona, XZ		Planned	
	561国道	China National Highway 561	Damxung, XZ	Lhasa, XZ		Planned	
	562国道	China National Highway 562	Jiyaquji, Baingoin, XZ	port of Yadong, XZ		Planned	
	563国道	China National Highway 563	Sa'gya Connecting Road			Planned	Lhatse-Sa'gya
	564国道	China National Highway 564	Burang Connecting Road			Planned	
	565国道	China National Highway 565	Zanda Connecting Road			Planned	
	566国道	China National Highway 566	Xiji, NX	Tianshui, GS		Planned	
	567国道	China National Highway 567	Lixian, GS	Kangxian, GS		Planned	
	568国道	China National Highway 568	Lanzhou, GS	Luqu, GS		Partial	
	569国道	China National Highway 569	Mandela, Alxa RB, NM	Datong, QH		Planned	
	570国道	China National Highway 570	Yongchang Connecting Road			Planned	Jinchang-Yongchang
	571国道	China National Highway 571	Subei, GS	Bashkurgan, Ruoqiang, XJ		Planned	changed from Subei connecting road to Subei-Ruoqiang in 2022
	572国道	China National Highway 572	Guinan, QH	Chahannuo, Ulan, QH		Planned	
	573国道	China National Highway 573	Zêkog, QH	Heka, Xinghai, QH		Planned	
	574国道	China National Highway 574	Chindu Connecting Road			Planned	
	575国道	China National Highway 575	Laoyemiao port, Barkol, XJ	Hami, XJ		Planned	
	576国道	China National Highway 576	Beitun, XJ	Shihezi, XJ		Planned	
	577国道	China National Highway 577	Jinghe, XJ	Zhaosu, XJ		Planned	
	578国道	China National Highway 578	Xinyuan, XJ	Nilka, XJ		Planned	
	579国道	China National Highway 579	Baicheng Connecting Road			Planned	
	580国道	China National Highway 580	Aksu, XJ	Kangxiwar, XJ		Partial	
	581国道	China National Highway 581	Kashgar, XJ	port of Erkeshtam, XJ			
600 Series
	601国道	China National Highway 601	Fuyuan, HL	Raohe, HL		Planned	
	602国道	China National Highway 602	Hulin, HL	Dongning, HL		Planned	
	603国道	China National Highway 603	Heihe, HL	Nenjiang, HL		Planned	
	604国道	China National Highway 604	Heihe, HL	Jiagedaqi, HL		Planned	
	605国道	China National Highway 605	Huma, HL	Ulanhot, NM		Planned	
	606国道	China National Highway 606	Wuchang, HL	Dunhua, JL		Planned	
	607国道	China National Highway 607	Harbin, HL	Songyuan, JL		Planned	
	608国道	China National Highway 608	Jalaid Banner, NM	Gongzhuling, JL		Planned	
	609国道	China National Highway 609	Hunchun, JL	port of Hunchun, JL		Planned	
	610国道	China National Highway 610	Hunchun, JL	Shatuozi port, Hunchun, JL		Planned	
	611国道	China National Highway 611	Helong, JL	Nanping port, Helong, JL		Planned	
	612国道	China National Highway 612	Manjiang, Fusong, JL	Linjiang, JL		Planned	
	613国道	China National Highway 613	Shenyang, JL	Zhuanghe, JL		Planned	
	614国道	China National Highway 614	Shijia, Chifeng, NM	Jinzhou port, LN		Planned	
	615国道	China National Highway 615	Yudaokou, Weichang, HE	Zhangjiakou, HE		Planned	
	616国道	China National Highway 616	Langfang, HE	Xiong'an, HE		Planned	
	617国道	China National Highway 617	Xiong'an, HE	Cangzhou, HE		Planned	
	618国道	China National Highway 618	Dezhou, SD	Shijiazhuang, HE		Planned	
	619国道	China National Highway 619	Dezhou, SD	Jinzhong, SX		Planned	
	620国道	China National Highway 620	Jingxing, HE	Mount Cangyan, HE		Planned	
	621国道	China National Highway 621	Moguqi, Zalantun, NM	port of Arxan, NM		Planned	
	622国道	China National Highway 622	Hulunbuir, NM	Handagai, NBL Banner, NM		Planned	
	623国道	China National Highway 623	Manzhouli, NM	New Barag Left Banner, NM		Planned	
	624国道	China National Highway 624	West Ujimqin Banner, NM	Hexigten, NM		Planned	
	625国道	China National Highway 625	East Ujimqin Banner, NM	Erenhot, NM		Planned	
	626国道	China National Highway 626	Wuliji port, Alxa LB, NM	Alxa Left Banner, NM		Planned	
	627国道	China National Highway 627	Ejin Banner, NM	Huluchigute		Planned	
	628国道	China National Highway 628	Lankao, HA	Wuhai, NM		Planned	
	629国道	China National Highway 629	Wuhai, NM	Xiji, NX		Planned	
	630国道	China National Highway 630	Hengshan, SN	Ansai, SN		Planned	
	631国道	China National Highway 631	Shangqiu, HA	Nanyang, HA		Planned	
	632国道	China National Highway 632	Yeji, AH	Xinyang, HA		Planned	
	633国道	China National Highway 633	Siyang, JS	Fuyang, AH		Planned	
	634国道	China National Highway 634	Taicang port, JS	Pinghu, ZJ		Planned	
	635国道	China National Highway 635	Wujiang, JS	Wuhu, AH		Planned	
	636国道	China National Highway 636	Wangjiang, AH	Dawu, HB		Planned	
	637国道	China National Highway 637	Taizhou, ZJ	Shangrao, JX		Planned	
	638国道	China National Highway 638	Qingtian, ZJ	Xiamen, FJ		Planned	
	639国道	China National Highway 639	Mazu, TW (de jure)	Fuzhou, FJ		Planned	
	640国道	China National Highway 640	Guangchang, JX	Changsha, HN		Planned	
	641国道	China National Highway 641	Lianhua, Pingxiang, JX	Xinhua, HN		Planned	
	642国道	China National Highway 642	Wanning, HI	Yangpu, HI		Planned	
	643国道	China National Highway 643	Qinyuan, SX	Huozhou, SX		Planned	
	644国道	China National Highway 644	Ergun, NM	port of Shiwei, NM		Planned	
	645国道	China National Highway 645	Fangxian, HB	Xingshan, HB		Planned	
	646国道	China National Highway 646	Badong, HB	Laifeng, HB		Planned	
	647国道	China National Highway 647	Yizhang, HN	Jianghua, HN		Planned	
	648国道	China National Highway 648	Qinzhou, GX	Chongzuo, GX		Planned	
	649国道	China National Highway 649	Napo, GX	Pingmeng port, Napo, GX		Planned	
	650国道	China National Highway 650	Dongzhong, Fangcheng, GX	port of Dongzhong, GX		Planned	
	651国道	China National Highway 651	Dajiuhu, Shennongjia, HB	Chengkou, CQ		Partial	
	652国道	China National Highway 652	Yunyang, CQ	Lichuan, HB		Planned	
	653国道	China National Highway 653	Dianjiang, CQ	Duyun, GZ		Planned	
	654国道	China National Highway 654	Ganlong, Songtao, GZ	Cengong, GZ		Planned	
	655国道	China National Highway 655	Congjiang, GZ	Libo, GZ		Planned	
	656国道	China National Highway 656	Tiechang, Guiding, GZ	Pingtang, GZ		Planned	
	657国道	China National Highway 657	Anshun, GZ	Luodian, GZ		Planned	
	658国道	China National Highway 658	Yuchong, Dafang, GZ	Puding, GZ		Planned	
	659国道	China National Highway 659	Guanling, GZ	Anlong, GZ		Planned	
	660国道	China National Highway 660	Quxian, SC	Huaying, SC		Planned	
	661国道	China National Highway 661	Leshan, SC	Ya'an, SC		Planned	
	662国道	China National Highway 662	Lixian, SC	Shimian, SC		Planned	
	663国道	China National Highway 663	Hongyuan, SC	Ninglang, YN		Planned	
	664国道	China National Highway 664	Daocheng, SC	Shangri-La, YN		Planned	
	665国道	China National Highway 665	Pingwu, SC	Songpan, SC		Planned	
	666国道	China National Highway 666	Jingtai, GS	Lanzhou, GS		Planned	
	667国道	China National Highway 667	Wuwei, GS	Dingxi, GS		Planned	
	668国道	China National Highway 668	Xiahe, GS	Zêkog, QH		Partial	
	669国道	China National Highway 669	Tongren, QH	Guide, QH		Planned	
	670国道	China National Highway 670	Haidong, QH	Huangyuan, QH		Planned	
	671国道	China National Highway 671	Taibai, Heshui, GS	Huachi, GS		Planned	
	672国道	China National Highway 672	Wenshan, YN	Mengzi, YN		Planned	
	673国道	China National Highway 673	Jinping, YN	Jinshuihe port, Jinping, YN		Planned	
	674国道	China National Highway 674	Jade Dragon Snow Mountain, YN	Lijiang, YN		Planned	
	675国道	China National Highway 675	Jiuxiang, YN	Yiliang, YN		Planned	
	676国道	China National Highway 676	Donggan, Malipo, YN	Mengkang port, Kangping, YN		Planned	
	677国道	China National Highway 677	Yiwu, Mengla, YN	Xinchang, Ximeng, YN		Planned	
	678国道	China National Highway 678	Fengwei, Zhenkang, YN	Jietou, Tengchong, YN		Planned	
	679国道	China National Highway 679	Wulasitai port, Qitai, XJ	Qitai, XJ		Planned	
	680国道	China National Highway 680	Takeshiken port, Qinggil, XJ	Fuyun, XJ		Partial	
	681国道	China National Highway 681	Altay, XJ	Kanas, XJ		Planned	
	682国道	China National Highway 682	Karamay, XJ	port of Alashankou, XJ		Planned	
	683国道	China National Highway 683	Yining, XJ	Dulata port, Qapqal, XJ		Planned	
	684国道	China National Highway 684	Mazha, Yining, XJ	port of Khunjerab, XJ		Planned	
	685国道	China National Highway 685	Jeminay, XJ	port of Jeminay, XJ		Planned	
	686国道	China National Highway 686	Tashkurgan, XJ	port of Kulma, XJ		Planned	
	687国道	China National Highway 687	Tiemenguan, XJ	Aral, XJ		Planned	
	688国道	China National Highway 688	Tumxuk, XJ	Kunyu, XJ		Planned	
	689国道	China National Highway 689	Aral, XJ	Nantun, XJ		Planned	
	690国道	China National Highway 690	Tekes, XJ	Kalajun, Tekes, XJ		Partial	
	691国道	China National Highway 691	Fukang, XJ	Tianshan Tianchi, XJ		Planned	
	692国道	China National Highway 692	Shuanghu, XZ	Baingoin, XZ		Planned	
	693国道	China National Highway 693	Gertse, XZ	Baga, Burang, XZ		Planned	
	694国道	China National Highway 694	Jiru, Yadong, XZ	Yadong, XZ		Planned	
	695国道	China National Highway 695	Lhünzê, XZ	Mazha, Yining, XJ		Planned	
	696国道	China National Highway 696	Pagsum, XZ	Bahe, Gongbo'gyamda, XZ		Planned	
	697国道	China National Highway 697	Damxung, XZ	Namtso, XZ		Planned	
	698国道	China National Highway 698	Chun'an, ZJ	Huangshan, AH		Planned	
	699国道	China National Highway 699	Hongsibu, NX	Jingchuan, GS		Planned	
700 Series
	700国道	China National Highway 700	Lanping, YN	Fugong, YN		Partial	
	701国道	China National Highway 701	Baiyü, SC	Bomê, XZ		Planned	

== See also ==
- Expressways of China
- Transport in China
- Tarim Desert Highway
- Karakoram Highway
