= Zhongtie Township =

Zhongtie Township 中铁乡 · འབྲོང་མཐུལ་ཞང་། Zhongtü
- Township
- Location in Qinghai
- Coordinates: 35°14′36″N 100°8′20″E
- Country: China
- Province: Qinghai
- Autonomous prefecture: Hainan
- County: Xinghai
- Village-level divisions: 7 villages

Area
  - Total: 873.32 km^{2} (337.19 sq mi)
- Elevation: 3,200 m (10,500 ft)

Population (2018)
  - Total: 7,423
  - Density: 8.500/km^{2} (22.01/sq mi)
- Time zone: UTC+8 (China Standard)
- Postal code: 813300
- Local dialing code: 974

Zhongtie Township (Chinese: 中铁乡; pinyin: Zhōngtiě Xiāng; lit. 'China Railway Township') or Zhongtü Township (Tibetan: འབྲོང་མཐུལ་ཞང་།) is a township in southeast Xinghai County, Hainan Tibetan Autonomous Prefecture, Qinghai, China with its administrative area bordering Tongde County to the east and Maqên County of Golog Prefecture to the south, Lungsang Township to the west and Qu'ngoin Township to the north.

Alternative Latin names for Zhongtie Township include Jilang, Kyiling, Zhongtie, Zhongtie Xiang, ji lang, zhong tie, zhong tie xiang. Alternative Mandarin names include 中铁 and 吉浪.

Zhongtie Township has mix between a monsoon-influenced subarctic climate (Dwc) and a continental climate on the Köppen climate classification system.

Zhongtie Township has jurisdiction over the following 7 villages:

- Duzong Village
- Jilang Village
- Qiaqing Village
- Douhoutang Village
- Ranmao Village
- Longwulong Village
- Heminzu Village or 'Ethnic Village' (Zhongtie Township's local government operates from here)

== Demographics ==
On November 1, 2010, Zhongtie Township had a population structure of 3,349 males, 3,199 females (51.1% to 49.9%), 1,944 aged under 14, 4,214 aged between 15 and 64, and 390 aged over 65 (29.7% to 64.4% to 6%). Zhongtie Township's population has fluctuated from 6,548 in 2010 to 6,045 in 2011 to 7,395 in 2017 to 7,423 in 2018. 97% of Zhongtie's Township's population has Tibetan descent, other groups included Han, Hui and Mongols.

== Geography and history ==
Zhongtie Township was granted more jurisdictional area in 2018, its area went from 889.4 km^{2} in 2010 to 873.32 km^{2}. In 2017, Zhongtie had 27 businesses with 152 employees, including one supermarket that takes up more than 50 square meters. It has 29 'production cooperatives' under its jurisdiction. Under its jurisdictional area it has a 40 kilometre long ditch under its jurisdiction named 'Zhongtie Longwa', a 38 kilometre long river connects this ditch with the Yellow River. Its average annual temperature is approximately 0.5 °C and its annual precipitation is 130mm. Zhongtie Township has frequent natural disasters and issues including hailstorms, droughts, gales, extremely low temperatures, ice storms etc. Zhongtie Township has 0.33 square kilometres of arable land. and 680 square kilometres of pastoral land. Zhongtie Township's main crop is wheat and in 2011, the township had 93,000 livestock heads. Zhongtie Township has 1 library that contains 30,000 books. The township holds sports competitions annually that include archery and horse racing.

During the reign of the Sui Dynasty, Zhongtie Township was considered a tribal community. In 1953, its administrative status as a township was granted by the county government. In 1958, it briefly lost its township status, but was again granted township status in 1984.
