= China National Highway 010 =

Road in China

China's National Highway G010, also called Tongsan Expressway (Tongjiang-Sanya Expressway), was an abolished national highway in China, which ran from Tongjiang in Heilongjiang to Sanya in Hainan. It was 5,700 km (3,500 mi) in length, the longest China National Highway at the time.

It passed through the provinces of Heilongjiang, Jilin, Liaoning, Shandong, Jiangsu, Shanghai, Zhejiang, Fujian and Guangdong. At Hai'an in Guangdong, Guangdong–Hainan Railway carries cars by ferry across the Qiongzhou Strait to Haikou in Hainan, before ending in Sanya.

It was part of the five north–south and seven east–west main routes in China. However, it has been abolished in 2010s, now being part of the G15 Shenyang–Haikou Expressway.

== See also ==
- China National Highways
- Expressways of China
