= G9811 Haikou–Ledong Expressway =

Expressway in Hainan, China

Haikou–Ledong Expressway
- 海口－乐东高速公路
- Haile Expressway 海乐高速

Route information
- Length: 246 km (153 mi)

Major junctions
- From: Haikou
- To: Ledong

Location
- Country: China

Highway system
- National Trunk Highway System; Primary; Auxiliary; National Highways; Transport in China
← G98	→ G9812

The Haikou-Ledong Expressway (Chinese: 海口－乐东高速公路), designated as G9811 and commonly referred to as the Haile Expressway (Chinese: 海乐高速), is 246-kilometre-long expressway (153 mi) located in Haikou, Hainan, China. Until 2022, the route ran further to Sanya, but due to difficulty in land acquisition south of Ledong, the route was shortened to Ledong.

== Segmentation Introduction ==
- Haitun section (Haikou-Tunchang): 72.03 kilometers in length, started in 2010, and officially opened to traffic on 29 December 2012.
- Tunqiong Section (Tunchang-Qiongzhong): A total length of 46.85 kilometers, which started on May 31, 2012, and was officially opened to traffic on May 30, 2015.
- Qiongle section (Qiongzhong-Wuzhishan-Ledong): 127.329 kilometers in length, opened to traffic on September 28, 2018.
