= China National Highway 666 =

Highway in China

National Highway 666
- 666国道

Route information
- Length: 141 km (88 mi)

Major junctions
- From: Jingtai County, Gansu
- To: Lanzhou, Gansu

Location
- Country: China

Highway system
- National Trunk Highway System; Primary; Auxiliary
| ← G665 | → G667 |

China National Highway 666, also known as the Jingtai-Lanzhou Highway, is a national highway in China, which connects Jingtai County and Lanzhou in Gansu. The highway is 141 km (88 mi) long.
