= Ziketan Town =

Town in Qinghai, China

Zigortang Town 子科滩镇 · ལ་ཟེ་བ་གྲོང་རྡལ། Ziketan, Zigongtang
- Town
- Location within Qinghai
- Coordinates: 35°35′19″N 99°59′12″E
- Country: China
- Province: Qinghai
- Prefecture: Hainan
- County: Xinghai
- Established: 1953

Area (approximate)
  - Total: 3,000 km^{2} (1,200 sq mi)
- Elevation: 3,193 m (10,476 ft)

Population
  - Total: 10,000
  - Density: 3.3/km^{2} (8.6/sq mi)

Ethnicity
  - Tibetan: 80%
- Time zone: UTC+8 (China Standard Time)

Zigortang Town (Tibetan: རྩི་གོར་ཐང་གྲོང་བརྡལ།), Zigongtang Town (རྩི་ཀོང་ཐང་), or Ziketan Town (Chinese: 子科滩镇) is a farming town in Xinghai County of Hainan Tibetan Autonomous Prefecture, Qinghai province, People's Republic of China. Zigortang town covers approximately 3,000 square kilometres (1,158 sq mi) and has a population of 10,000.

Zigortang is 167 kilometres (104 mi) southwest of the Qinghai provincial capital of Xining. Zigortang lies approximately 1,300 kilometres (810 mi) west of Beijing.

== 2009 pneumonic plague outbreak ==
The outbreak in Zigortang was first detected on Thursday, July 30, 2009. On August 2, the authorities quarantined Zigortang after a dozen people were sickened with pneumonic plague, a lung infection that can kill a human in 24 hours if left untreated. Police checkpoints were set up in a 17-mile (27 km) radius around Zigortang, and residents were not allowed to leave. The streets were largely deserted and most shops shut, and 23 quarantine stations were set up in the town. The quarantine zone covered an area of 3,500 square kilometres (1,400 sq mi) centred on the town.

The first casualty was a 32-year-old herder who had fallen ill after burying his dog, which had died suddenly after eating a marmot infected with the bacterium Yersinia pestis. The dog's owner caught the disease while burying the dog, according to professor Wang Hu, director of the Qinghai disease control bureau. The herder died four days after the dog's burial, and the relatives who handled his funeral were showing symptoms within days. The 10 people sickened, mostly relatives of the herder, were undergoing isolated treatment in hospital, managed by the local health bureau. Police guarded the quarantine center at the township hospital. On Sunday, a 37-year-old man identified only as Danzin, a neighbour of the first victim, became the second reported fatality from the outbreak. On Monday, a 64-year-old man named Danzhi, a neighbour of the first two victims, was the third fatality. As of August 6, no new cases of pneumonic plague had been found beyond the 12 patients in the town who were quarantined on July 31. As of August 6, three patients died and two were still in critical condition.

The quarantine on the town was lifted on Saturday (2000 hrs, local time), August 8, 2009. This came after no reports of new infections for more than a week.

=== Preparedness and response ===
Authorities urged anyone who had visited Zigortang town since mid-July and has developed a cough or fever to seek hospital treatment. The World Health Organization office in China is in close contact with Chinese health authorities. More than 140 epidemic-prevention professionals from the Ministry of Health and provincial-level institutions were working in the area.

In Zigortang, authorities have said homes and shops should be disinfected, and residents should wear face masks when they go out. Around 80 percent of the town's shops were closed on Monday, and prices of disinfectants and some vegetables have already tripled. County officials distributed flyers and made television and radio announcements on how to prevent infection. Medical workers in Zigortang were disinfecting and killing rodents and insects that can be carriers for the bacterium that causes the plague. Authorities are keeping close track of people who came into contact with those infected.

This was the third outbreak of the disease in Qinghai within the last 10 years. Provincial health authorities in Qinghai and central government have been concerned about pneumonic plague for some years. As of February 2009, there were 55 teams across the province tasked to monitor and control the disease.

== See also ==
- Disease surveillance in China
- Public health-care in China
