= China National Highway 667 =

Highway in China

National Highway 667
- 667国道

Route information
- Length: 471 km (293 mi)

Major junctions
- From: Wuwei, Gansu
- To: Dingxi, Gansu

Location
- Country: China

Highway system
- National Trunk Highway System; Primary; Auxiliary
← G666	→ G668

China National Highway 667, also known as the Wuwei-Dingxi Highway, is a national highway in China, which connects Wuwei and Dingxi in Gansu. The highway is 471 km (293 mi) long.
