= G9812 Haikou–Qionghai Expressway =

Road in Hainan, China

Haikou–Qionghai Expressway
- 海口－琼海高速公路

Route information
- Length: 117.83 km (73.22 mi)

Location
- Country: China

Highway system
- National Trunk Highway System; Primary; Auxiliary; National Highways; Transport in China
| ← G9811 | → G9813 |

The Haikou-Qionghai Expressway (Chinese: 海琼高速公路), designated as G9812, is an expressway located in Hainan, China. The starting point is Haikou Guilin Yang, via Wenchang, Qionghai to reach the destination Wanquan Interchange, connecting G98 Hainan Island Ring Expressway East Section and Qionghai Bo'ao Airport Access road.

The Haikou-Wenchang Expressway is the original Haiwen Expressway, which was opened to traffic on September 28, 2002. The Wenchang-Qionghai section was completed and opened to traffic on September 21, 2019.
