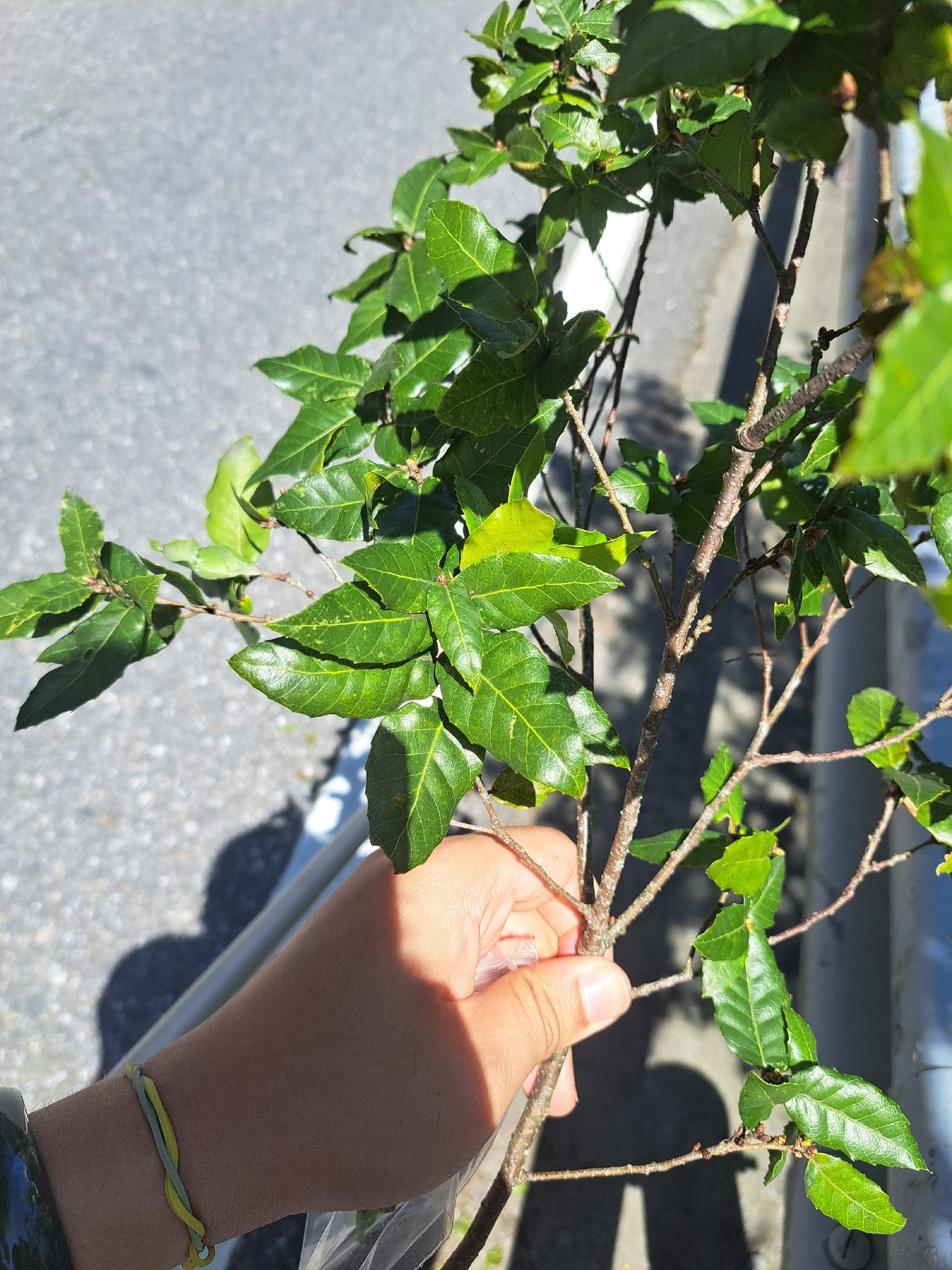
- Quercus tarokoensis from the nominal Taroko National Park, Taiwan

Conservation status
- Data Deficient (IUCN 3.1)

Scientific classification
- Kingdom: Plantae
- Clade: Embryophytes
- Clade: Tracheophytes
- Clade: Angiosperms
- Clade: Eudicots
- Clade: Rosids
- Order: Fagales
- Family: Fagaceae
- Genus: Quercus
- Subgenus: Quercus subg. Cerris
- Section: Quercus sect. Ilex
- Species: Q. tarokoensis

Binomial name
- Quercus tarokoensis Hayata (1918)

= Quercus tarokoensis =

Species of oak

Quercus tarokoensis is a species of oak. It is a tree endemic to eastern Taiwan. It grows on calcareous (limestone-derived) soils in evergreen forests, often on steep slopes, from 400 to 1,300 meters elevation.

The species was first described by Bunzō Hayata in 1918. It is part of Quercus section Ilex, and is closely related to Q. bawanglingensis of Hainan.

The species was named after Taroko Gorge in Taroko National Park in Taiwan.
