= Xinghai County =

Xinghai County 兴海县 · བྲག་དཀར་རྫོང་།
- County
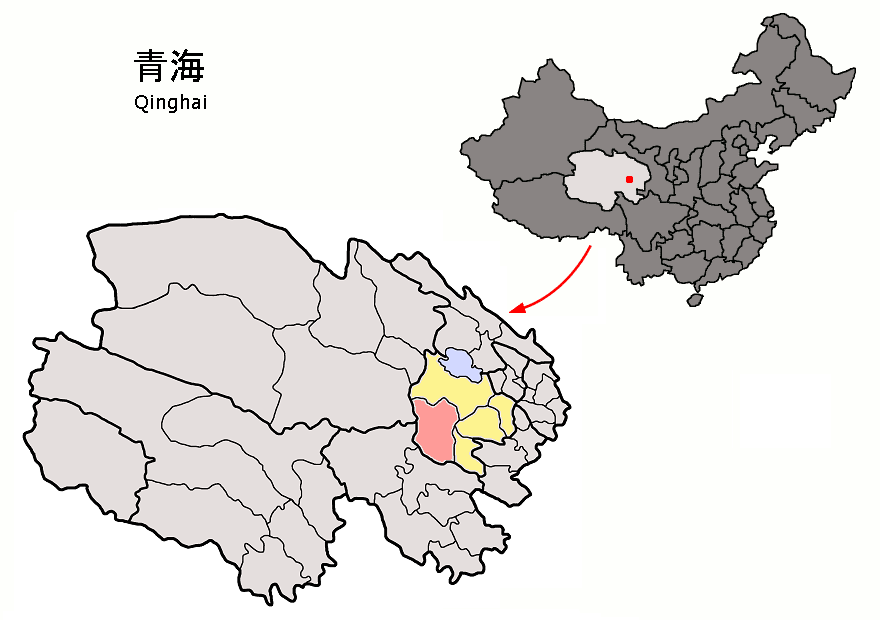
- Xinghai County (red) within Hainan Prefecture (yellow) and Qinghai

- Location of the seat in Qinghai
- Coordinates (Xinghai government): 35°35′22″N 99°59′22″E
- Country: China
- Province: Qinghai
- Prefecture-level city: Hainan
- County seat: Zigortang

Area
  - Total: 13,158 km^{2} (5,080 sq mi)

Population (2020)
  - Total: 75,833
  - Density: 5.7633/km^{2} (14.927/sq mi)
- Time zone: UTC+8 (China Standard)
- Postal code: 813300
- Area code: 0974
- Website: www.xinghai.gov.cn

Xinghai County

Chinese name
- Simplified Chinese: 兴海县
- Traditional Chinese: 興海縣
Transcriptions
Standard Mandarin
- Hanyu Pinyin: Xīnghǎi Xiàn

Tibetan name
- Tibetan: བྲག་དཀར་རྫོང་། or ཞིན་ཧེ་རྫོང་།
Transcriptions
- Wylie: brag dkar rdzong or zhin he rdzong
- Tibetan Pinyin: Xinhê Zong or Zhaggar Zong

Xinghai County (Chinese: 兴海县; Tibetan: བྲག་དཀར་རྫོང་།) is a county under the jurisdiction of Hainan Tibetan Autonomous Prefecture, in the east-central part of Qinghai Province, China.

Xinghai has an area of 13,158 km^{2} (5,080 sq mi), and a 2001 population of 60,000.

== Administrative divisions ==
Xinghai is made up of 3 towns, and 4 townships.

Name	Simplified Chinese	Hanyu Pinyin	Tibetan	Wylie	Administrative division code
Towns
Zigortang Town (Ziketan)	子科滩镇	Zǐkētān Zhèn	རྩི་གོར་ཐང་གྲོང་བརྡལ།	rtsi gor thang grong brdal	632524100
Hoika Town (Heka)	河卡镇	Hékǎ Zhèn	ཧོལ་ཁ་གྲོང་རྡལ།	hol kha grong rdal	632524101
Qu'ngoin Town (Qushi'an)	曲什安镇	Qǔshí'ān Zhèn	ཆུ་སྔོན་གྲོང་བརྡལ།	chu sngon grong brdal	632524102
Townships
Qukoi Township (Tsigorthang, Wenquan)	温泉乡	Wēnquán Xiāng	ཆུ་ཁོལ་ཞང་།	chu khol zhang	632524200
Lungsang Township (Longzang, Longcang)	龙藏乡	Lóngzàng Xiāng	ལུང་བཟང་ཞང་།	lung bzang zhang	632524201
Zhongtü Township (Zhongtie)	中铁乡	Zhōngtiě Xiāng	འབྲོང་མཐུལ་ཞང་།	'brong mthul zhang	632524202
Tangnag Township (Tangnaihai)	唐乃亥乡	Tángnǎihài Xiāng	ཐང་ནག་ཞང་།	thang nag zhang	632524203

== Climate ==
Climate data for Xinghai, elevation 3,323 m (10,902 ft), (1991–2020 normals, extremes 1981–2010)
Month	Jan	Feb	Mar	Apr	May	Jun	Jul	Aug	Sep	Oct	Nov	Dec	Year
Record high °C (°F)	12.9 (55.2)	15.0 (59.0)	20.1 (68.2)	25.5 (77.9)	24.9 (76.8)	25.7 (78.3)	30.2 (86.4)	29.9 (85.8)	26.9 (80.4)	19.6 (67.3)	13.8 (56.8)	12.8 (55.0)	30.2 (86.4)
Mean daily maximum °C (°F)	−0.5 (31.1)	2.9 (37.2)	7.0 (44.6)	11.7 (53.1)	14.6 (58.3)	16.8 (62.2)	19.2 (66.6)	19.2 (66.6)	15.5 (59.9)	10.3 (50.5)	5.3 (41.5)	0.7 (33.3)	10.2 (50.4)
Daily mean °C (°F)	−10.9 (12.4)	−7.0 (19.4)	−2.0 (28.4)	3.7 (38.7)	7.6 (45.7)	10.8 (51.4)	13.0 (55.4)	12.4 (54.3)	8.4 (47.1)	2.0 (35.6)	−4.8 (23.4)	−10.0 (14.0)	1.9 (35.5)
Mean daily minimum °C (°F)	−19.4 (−2.9)	−15.5 (4.1)	−10.0 (14.0)	−4.2 (24.4)	0.6 (33.1)	4.7 (40.5)	6.9 (44.4)	6.2 (43.2)	2.6 (36.7)	−4.4 (24.1)	−12.4 (9.7)	−18.3 (−0.9)	−5.3 (22.5)
Record low °C (°F)	−31.5 (−24.7)	−30.9 (−23.6)	−24.1 (−11.4)	−18.1 (−0.6)	−9.8 (14.4)	−5.7 (21.7)	−1.9 (28.6)	−3.8 (25.2)	−7.5 (18.5)	−15.1 (4.8)	−26.6 (−15.9)	−28.7 (−19.7)	−31.5 (−24.7)
Average precipitation mm (inches)	1.5 (0.06)	2.2 (0.09)	5.8 (0.23)	15.0 (0.59)	48.2 (1.90)	77.0 (3.03)	92.3 (3.63)	77.6 (3.06)	54.3 (2.14)	14.7 (0.58)	1.6 (0.06)	1.0 (0.04)	391.2 (15.41)
Average precipitation days (≥ 0.1 mm)	2.0	2.1	4.1	5.7	12.8	17.7	17.9	16.3	13.7	6.6	1.3	0.9	101.1
Average snowy days	3.1	3.4	6.0	6.5	4.1	0.4	0	0.1	0.8	5.4	2.2	1.3	33.3
Average relative humidity (%)	38	35	36	41	54	65	69	69	69	58	42	37	51
Mean monthly sunshine hours	229.6	211.0	235.9	239.6	227.7	197.8	209.4	216.6	188.8	227.4	239.9	237.4	2,661.1
Percentage possible sunshine	73	68	63	61	52	46	48	53	51	66	79	79	62
Source: China Meteorological Administration

== See also ==
- List of administrative divisions of Qinghai
