= China National Highway 228 =

Road in China

National Highway 228
- 228国道

Major junctions
- From: Dandong, Liaoning
- To: Dongxing, Guangxi

Location
- Country: China

Highway system
- National Trunk Highway System; Primary; Auxiliary
← G227	→ G229

China National Highway 228 (228国道) is a planned highway of the National Highway System of the People's Republic of China to run from Dandong, Liaoning on the China–North Korea border to Dongxing, Guangxi on the China–Vietnam border.

This route follows the coastline of Mainland China closely and has a planned length of 7,800 km (4,800 mi).

== Route ==
The route will run from Dandong, Liaoning on the China–North Korea border to Dongxing, Guangxi on the China–Vietnam border. En route, it will pass through Dalian and Yingkou in Liaoning; Binhai New Area in Tianjin; Huanghua in Hebei; Dongying, Yantai, Weihai, Qinghai, and Rizhao in Shandong; Lianyungang and Nantong in Jiangsu; Shanghai; Jiaxing, Ningbo, Taizhou, Wenzhou, and Ningde in Zhejiang; Fuzhou, Quanzhou, and Xiamen in Fujian; Shantou, Shenzhen, Zhuhai, Zhanjiang in Guangdong; and Beihai and Fangchenggang in Guangxi.

== Shanghai segment ==
The segment of G228 in Shanghai is planned to follow the basic route of the G40 Shanghai–Xi'an Expressway, and will pass through Chongming District, Pudong District, Fengxian District, and Jinshan District.

== Zhejiang segment ==
G228 will be the first national highway serving Yuhuan County.

In late 2015 and early 2016, the government put out requests for tenders relating to various segments of G228 in Wenzhou, including for a bridge to be built on the Ao River for the Pingyang County to Cangnan County segment of the highway, and for work on the Longsha Township (龙沙乡) to Dailing She Ethnic Township segment.

== Guangxi segment ==
On 29 December 2024, the Longmen Bridge opened, which is the longest sea-crossing bridge in Guangxi.

== See also ==
- China National Highway 219, which follows the southern and western land borders of China.
- China National Highway 331, which follows the northern border of China
