= Tangnaihai Township, Qinghai =

Tangnag Township 唐乃亥乡 · ཐང་ནག་ཞང་། Tangnaihai
- Township
- Location in Qinghai
- Coordinates: 35°30′35″N 100°8′45″E
- Country: China
- Province: Qinghai
- Autonomous prefecture: Hainan
- County: Xinghai

Area
  - Total: 858.5 km^{2} (331.5 sq mi)

Population (2010)
  - Total: 8,678
  - Density: 10.11/km^{2} (26.18/sq mi)
- Time zone: UTC+8 (China Standard)
- Local dialing code: 974

Tangnag Township (Tibetan: ཐང་ནག་ཞང་།) or Tangnaihai Township (Chinese: 唐乃亥乡) is a township in Xinghai County, Hainan Tibetan Autonomous Prefecture, Qinghai, China. In 2010, Tangnag Township had a total population of 8,678 people: 4,411 males and 4,267 females: 2,485 under 14 years old, 5,746 aged between 15 and 64 and 447 over 65 years old.
