= China National Highway 227 =

Road in China

National Highway 227
- 227国道

Route information
- Length: 3,745 km (2,327 mi)

Major junctions
- From: Zhangye, Gansu
- To: Pu'er, Yunnan

Location
- Country: China

Highway system
- National Trunk Highway System; Primary; Auxiliary
← G225	→ G228

China National Highway 227 (227国道) runs from Zhangye, Gansu to Pu'er, Yunnan. It is 3,745 kilometres in length and runs south from Zhangye towards Menglian County of Pu'er.

== Route and distance ==
Route and distance

City	Distance (km)
Zhangye, Gansu	0
Minle, Gansu	65
Datong, Qinghai	295
Xining, Qinghai	325
Huangzhong, Qinghai	350
Hainan, Qinghai	420
Maqên, Qinghai	740
Gadê, Qinghai	830
Darlag, Qinghai	880
Banma, Qinghai	1040
Zamthang, Sichuan	1200
Luhuo, Sichuan	1350
Garzê, Sichuan	1450
Xinlong, Sichuan	1530
Litang, Sichuan	1680
Daocheng, Sichuan	
Muli, Sichuan	
Yanyuan, Sichuan	2350
Miyi, Sichuan	2480
Yanbian, Sichuan	2540
Panzhihua, Sichuan	2570
Yongren, Yunnan	2650
Dayao, Yunnan	2710
Yao'an, Yunnan	2740
Mouding, Yunnan	
Chuxiong, Yunnan	2810
Shuangbai, Yunnan	2870
Mojiang, Yunnan	3100
Jiangcheng, Yunnan	3260
Pu'er, Yunnan	3410
Lancang, Yunnan	3590
Menglian, Yunnan	3640

== See also ==
- China National Highways
