= G99 Taiwan Ring Expressway =

Proposed road in Taiwan

Major junctions
- Orbital around Taiwan

Taiwan Ring Expressway
- Simplified Chinese: 台湾环线高速公路
- Traditional Chinese: 臺灣環線高速公路
Transcriptions
Standard Mandarin
- Hanyu Pinyin: Táiwān Huánxiàn Gāosù Gōnglù
- Wade–Giles: T'aiwan Huanhsien K'aosu Kunglu
Yue: Cantonese
- Yale Romanization: Toi4 waan1 Hwan2 syan4 Gau1 su4 gung1 lu4
- Jyutping: Toi4 waan1 Waan4 sin3 Gou1 cuk1 gung1 lou6

The Taiwan Ring Expressway (Chinese: 台湾环线高速公路) was a proposed, hypothetical expressway encircling the island of Taiwan as part of the National Trunk Highway System of the People's Republic of China. It never came into fruition, though, due to the political status of Taiwan. The People's Republic of China claims control over Taiwan, but has never administered it. Taiwan is governed by the Republic of China, which has its own highway system and does not recognize the designation by the People's Republic of China.

According to the People's Republic of China, the expressway would have passed through the cities of Taipei, Hsinchu, Taichung, Tainan, Kaohsiung, Taitung, Hualien, Yilan, Keelung, before returning to Taipei. The route of its western half was identical to that of National Highway 1 under the Taiwanese highway system.

China Expwy G99 sign with name

China Expwy G99 sign with no name

== Cancellation ==
In the 71118 plan of 2017, G99 was officially removed off of the books. This announcement was reaffirmed during the July 2022 expansion.

The "G99" number is currently used in the NTHS for metropolitan area ring roads (G99XX), which are somewhere between city ring roads (GXX0X) and orbitals (G9X) in degree of importance.
