= Shilu, Hainan =

Town in Hainan, China

Shilu 石碌镇
- Town
- Location in Hainan
- Coordinates: 19°16′45″N 109°03′07″E
- Country: People's Republic of China
- Province: Hainan
- Autonomous county: Changjiang Li Autonomous County
- Time zone: UTC+8 (China Standard)

Shilu Town (Chinese: 石碌镇; pinyin: Shílù zhèn) is the county seat of Changjiang Li Autonomous County in China's Hainan Island. It is known for a major iron ore deposit (the Shilu Iron Ore Mine, 石碌铁矿), which has been worked since the Japanese occupation of the island in the early 1940s.
