= China National Highway 224 =

Road in China

National Highway 224
- 224国道

Route information
- Length: 309 km (192 mi)

Major junctions
- From: Haikou in Hainan
- To: Sanya in Hainan

Location
- Country: China

Highway system
- National Trunk Highway System; Primary; Auxiliary
← G223	→ G225

China National Highway 224 (224国道) runs from Haikou in Hainan to Sanya, Hainan. It is 309 kilometres in length. It is the middle part of Hainan Ring Highway.

== Route and distance ==
Route and distance

City	Distance (km)
Haikou, Hainan	0
Xiuying District, Hainan	8
Tunchang, Hainan	93
Qiongzhong, Hainan	145
Tongshi, Hainan	223
Tiandu, Hainan	295
Yulin, Hainan	304
Sanya, Hainan	309

== See also ==
- China National Highways
