= Heka, Qinghai =

Hoika 河卡镇 · ཧོལ་ཁ་གྲོང་རྡལ། Heka
- Town
- Location in Qinghai
- Coordinates: 35°53′24″N 99°59′39″E
- Country: China
- Province: Qinghai
- Autonomous prefecture: Hainan
- County: Xinghai

Area
  - Total: 2,068 km^{2} (798 sq mi)

Population (2010)
  - Total: 14,233
  - Density: 6.882/km^{2} (17.83/sq mi)
- Time zone: UTC+8 (China Standard)
- Local dialing code: 974

Hoika or Heka (Tibetan: ཧོལ་ཁ་གྲོང་རྡལ།, Chinese: 河卡镇) is a town in Xinghai County, Hainan Tibetan Autonomous Prefecture, Qinghai, China. In 2010, Hoika had a total population of 14,233 people: 7,252 males and 6,981 females: 3,903 under 14 years old, 9,621 aged between 15 and 64 and 659 over 65 years old.
