= China National Highway 225 =

Road in China

National Highway 225
- 225国道

Route information
- Length: 429 km (267 mi)

Major junctions
- From: Haikou in Hainan
- To: Sanya in Hainan

Location
- Country: China

Highway system
- National Trunk Highway System; Primary; Auxiliary
← G224	→ G227

China National Highway 225 (225国道) runs from Haikou in Hainan to Sanya, Hainan. It is 429 kilometres in length. It is the western part of Hainan Ring Highway. (The eastern part of the ring is China National Highway 223).

Along most of its length, Highway 225 parallels Hainan Western Ring Railway.

== Route and distance ==
Route and distance

City	Distance (km)
Haikou, Hainan	0
Xiuying District, Hainan	8
Lingao County, Hainan	
Danzhou, Hainan	135
Changjiang Li Autonomous County, Hainan	
Basuo Town, Dongfang City, Hainan	254
Sanya, Hainan	429

== See also ==
- China National Highways
