= Raohe County =

Raohe County 饶河县
- County
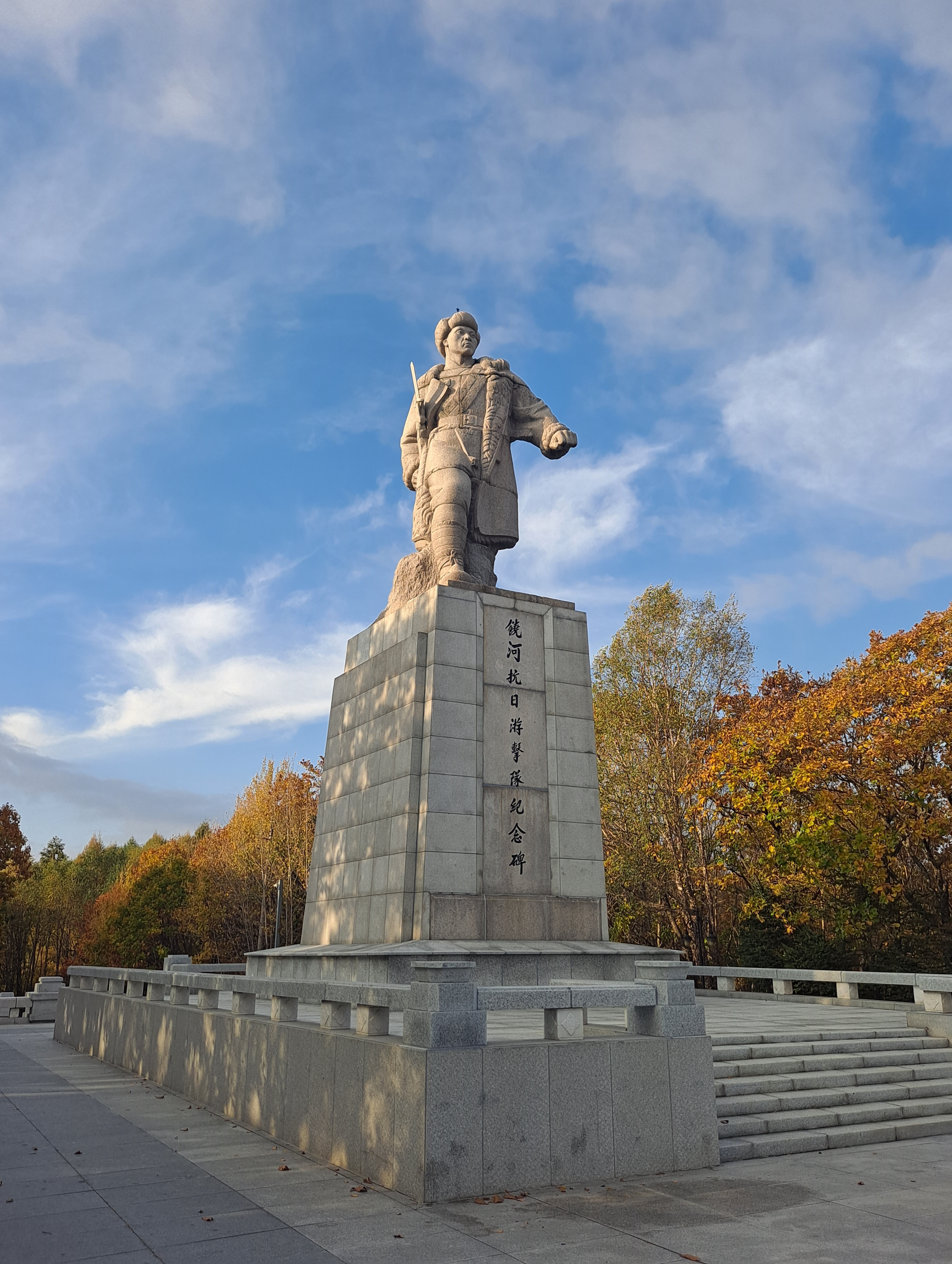
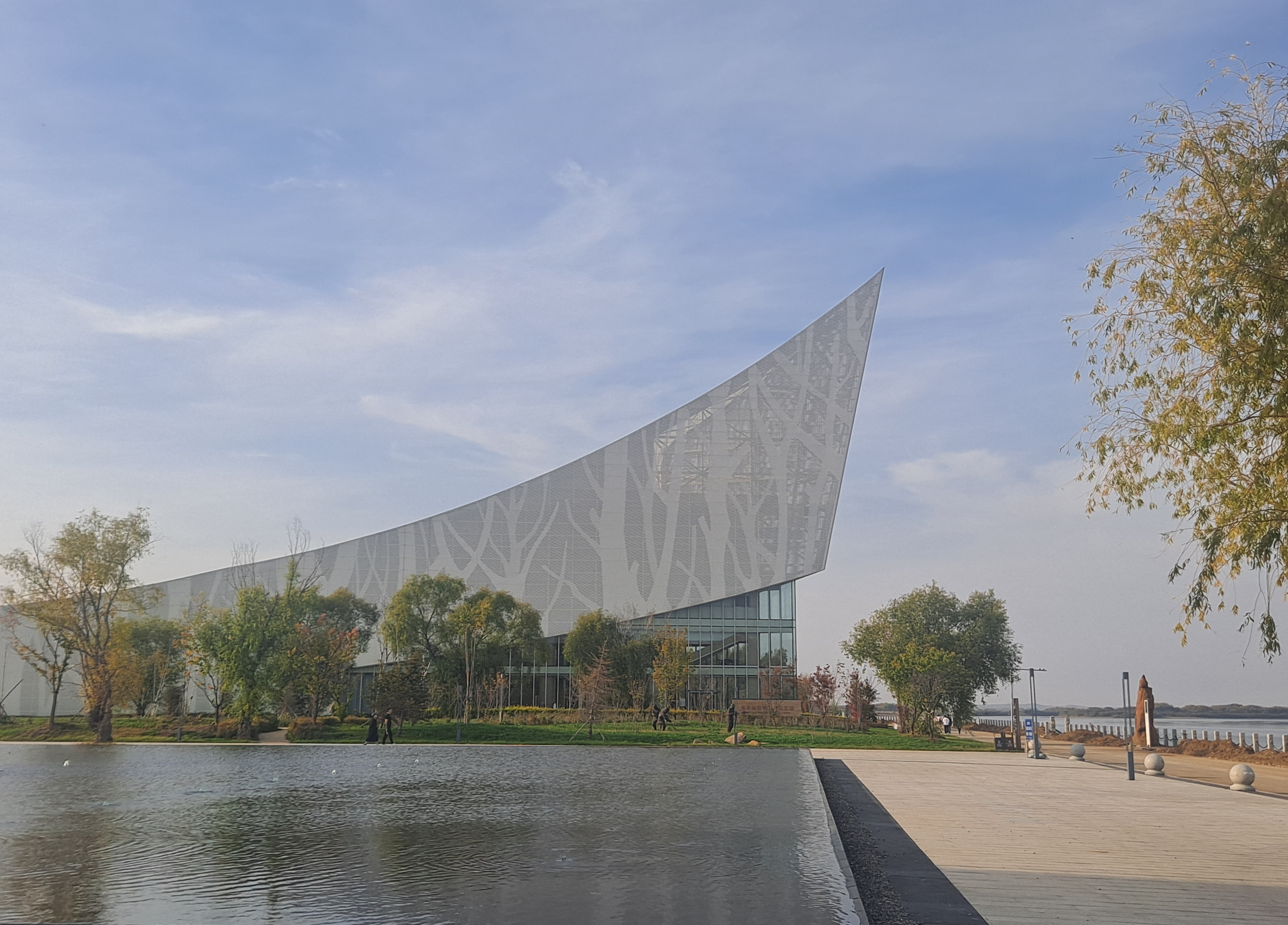
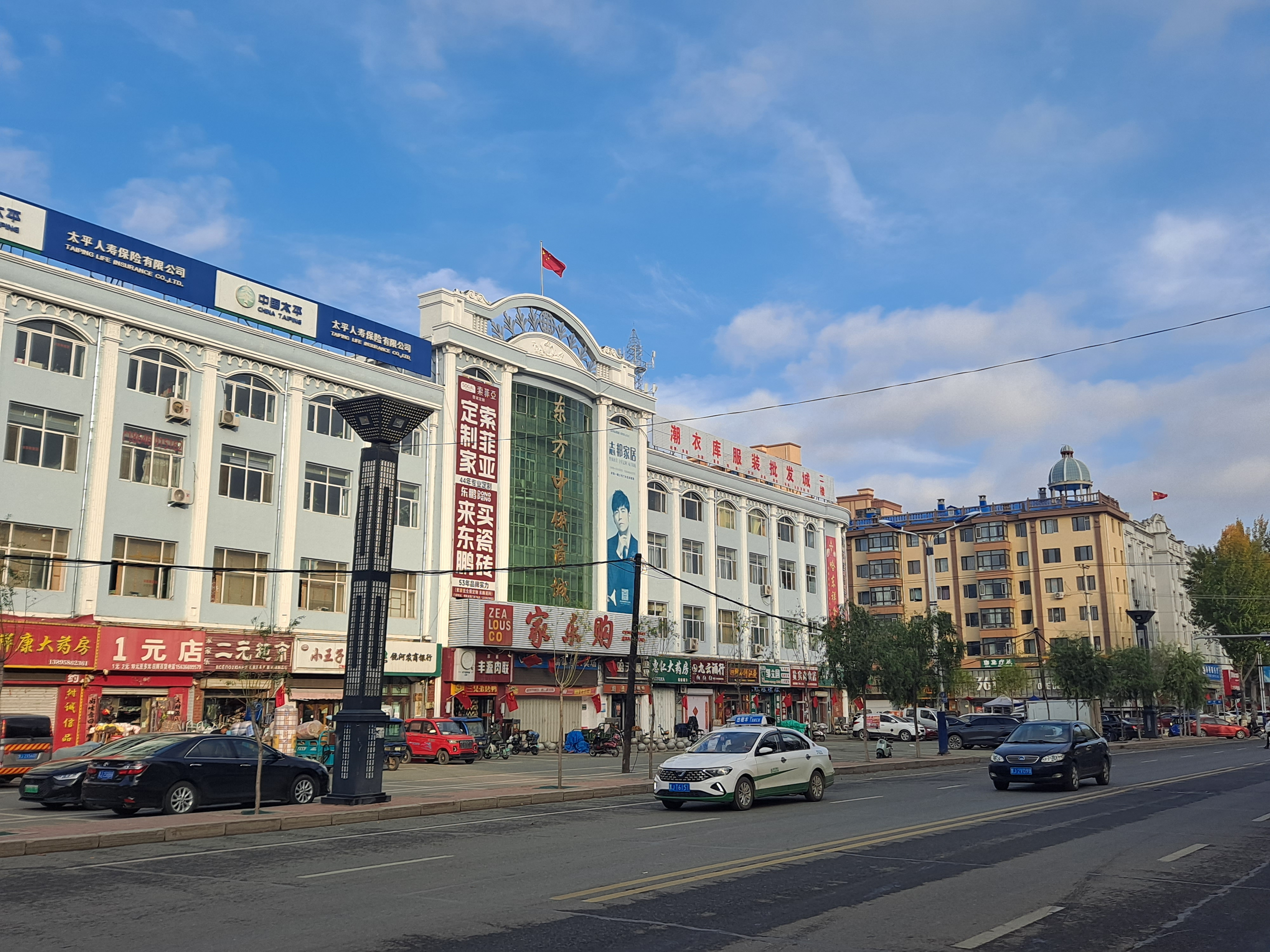
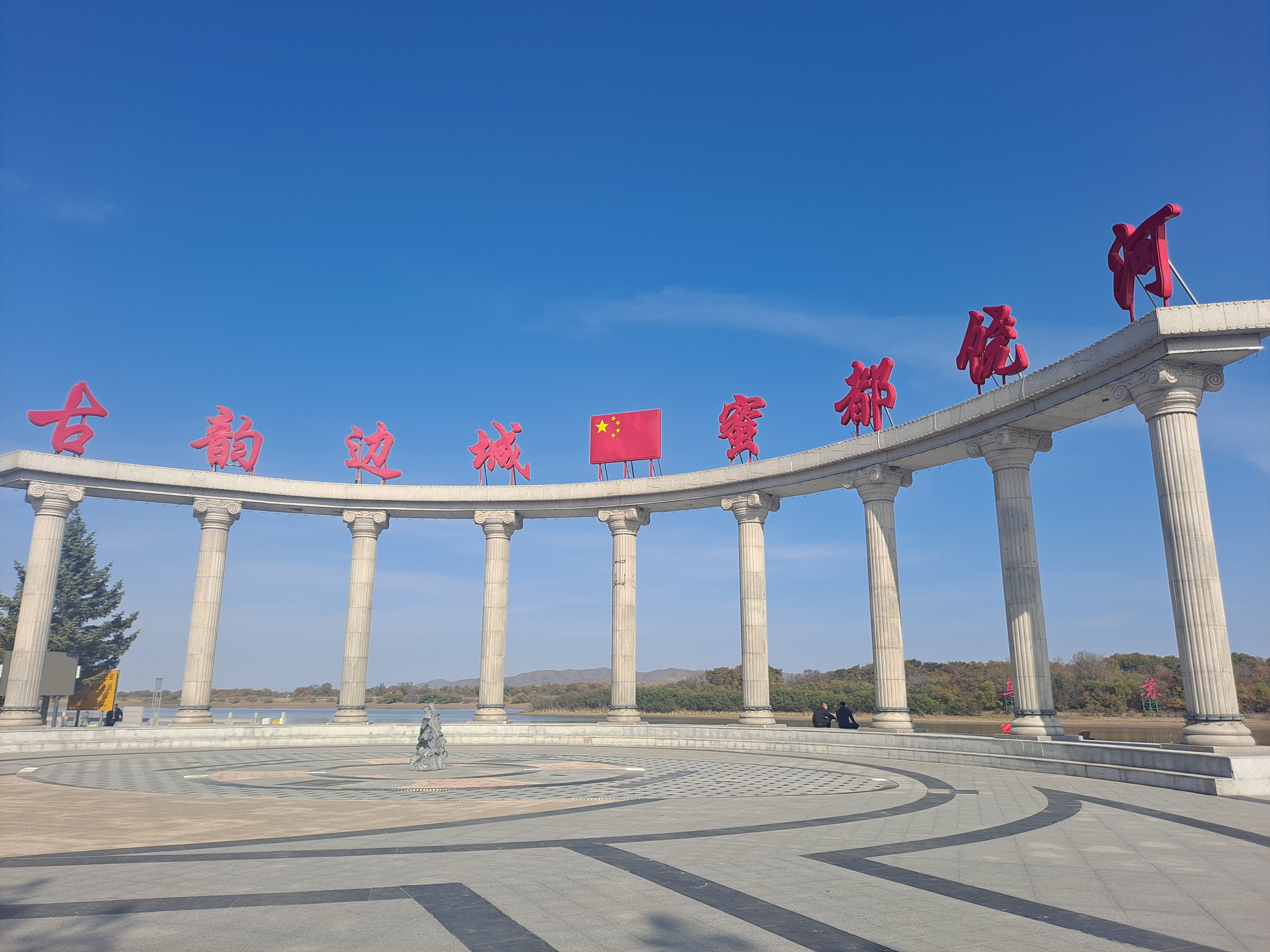
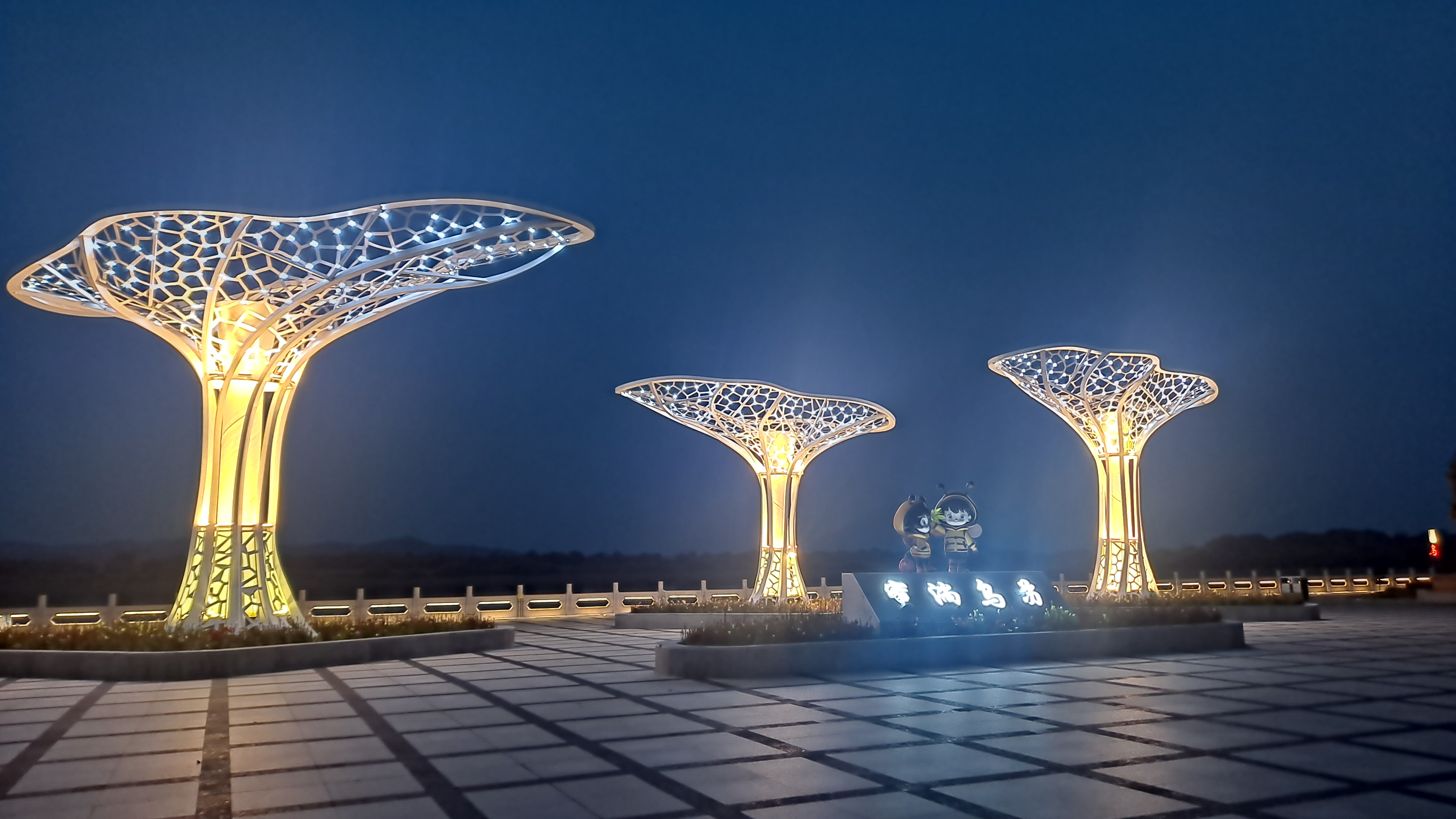
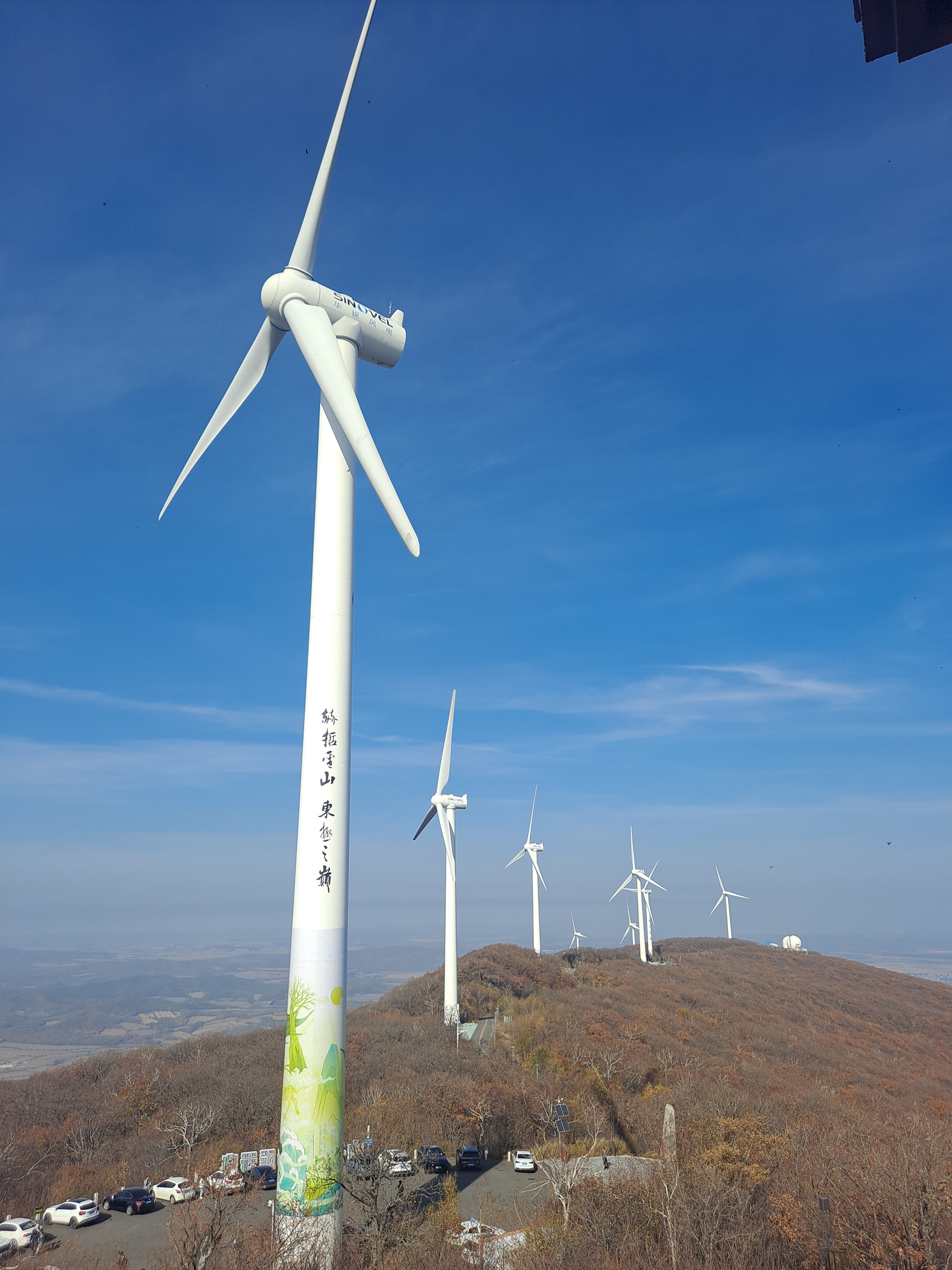
- 饶河抗日游击队纪念碑 四排赫哲族风情园 饶河县街景 乌苏里沿江广场 蜜淌乌苏 大顶子山

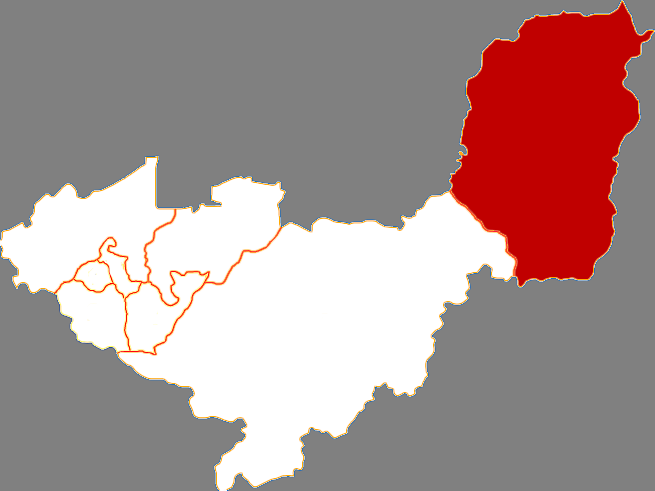
- Raohe in Shuangyashan

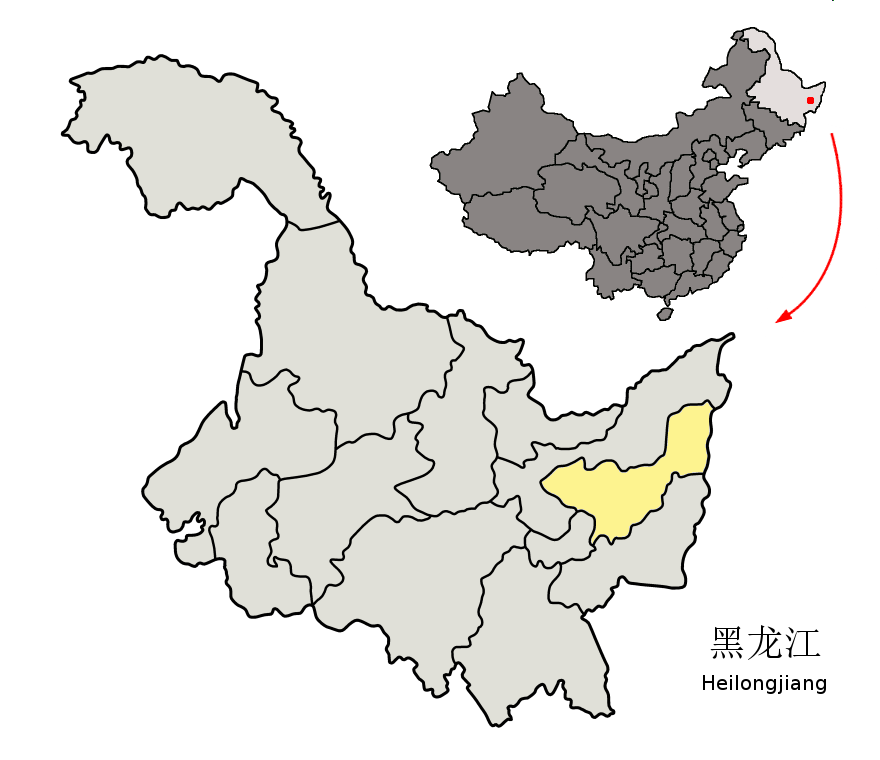
- Shuangyashan in Heilongjiang
- Coordinates: 46°47′53″N 134°00′50″E
- Country: People's Republic of China
- Province: Heilongjiang
- Prefecture-level city: Shuangyashan

Area
  - Land: 6,613 km^{2} (2,553 sq mi)

Population (2003)
  - Total: 140,000
  - Density: 21/km^{2} (55/sq mi)
- Time zone: UTC+8 (China Standard)

Raohe County (simplified Chinese: 饶河县; traditional Chinese: 饒河縣; pinyin: Ráohé Xiàn) is a county of far eastern Heilongjiang province, People's Republic of China, bordering Russia's Khabarovsk Krai and Primorsky Krai to the east. It is under the jurisdiction of the prefecture-level city of Shuangyashan.

== Administrative divisions ==
Raohe County is divided into 4 towns and 5 townships.

4 towns

- Raohe (饶河镇), Xiaojiahe (小佳河镇), Xifeng (西丰镇), Wulindong (五林洞镇)

5 townships

- Xilinzi (西林子乡), Sipai (四排乡), Dajiahe (大佳河乡), Shanli (山里乡), Datonghe (大通河乡)

== Demographics ==
The population of the district was 136,195 in 1999.

== Climate ==
Cool summer, severe cold winter, rain and heat at the same time are the climatic characteristics of Raohe County.

Climate data for Raohe, elevation 54 m (177 ft), (1991–2020 normals, extremes 1981–2010)
Month	Jan	Feb	Mar	Apr	May	Jun	Jul	Aug	Sep	Oct	Nov	Dec	Year
Record high °C (°F)	1.2 (34.2)	6.8 (44.2)	14.7 (58.5)	27.1 (80.8)	31.4 (88.5)	37.3 (99.1)	35.6 (96.1)	36.5 (97.7)	30.7 (87.3)	25.5 (77.9)	16.5 (61.7)	2.9 (37.2)	37.3 (99.1)
Mean daily maximum °C (°F)	−13.4 (7.9)	−8.0 (17.6)	0.7 (33.3)	11.3 (52.3)	19.3 (66.7)	23.8 (74.8)	26.7 (80.1)	25.3 (77.5)	20.3 (68.5)	11.6 (52.9)	−1.3 (29.7)	−11.7 (10.9)	8.7 (47.7)
Daily mean °C (°F)	−19.5 (−3.1)	−14.8 (5.4)	−5.1 (22.8)	5.4 (41.7)	13.2 (55.8)	18.4 (65.1)	21.7 (71.1)	20.3 (68.5)	14.2 (57.6)	5.8 (42.4)	−6.1 (21.0)	−16.9 (1.6)	3.0 (37.5)
Mean daily minimum °C (°F)	−25.0 (−13.0)	−21.5 (−6.7)	−11.2 (11.8)	−0.1 (31.8)	7.3 (45.1)	13.3 (55.9)	17.3 (63.1)	16.0 (60.8)	8.8 (47.8)	0.4 (32.7)	−10.6 (12.9)	−21.7 (−7.1)	−2.2 (27.9)
Record low °C (°F)	−43.1 (−45.6)	−39.2 (−38.6)	−32.7 (−26.9)	−22.3 (−8.1)	−4.4 (24.1)	0.7 (33.3)	8.8 (47.8)	6.4 (43.5)	−3.3 (26.1)	−14.5 (5.9)	−31.5 (−24.7)	−36.9 (−34.4)	−43.1 (−45.6)
Average precipitation mm (inches)	8.7 (0.34)	6.6 (0.26)	16.9 (0.67)	31.3 (1.23)	66.0 (2.60)	66.8 (2.63)	138.5 (5.45)	133.7 (5.26)	70.0 (2.76)	43.2 (1.70)	19.6 (0.77)	12.8 (0.50)	614.1 (24.17)
Average precipitation days (≥ 0.1 mm)	8.0	5.9	8.4	9.9	13.3	12.7	13.9	14.5	11.2	9.4	8.2	9.4	124.8
Average snowy days	11.6	9.2	10.7	4.6	0.1	0	0	0	0	2.6	10.4	12.7	61.9
Average relative humidity (%)	70	67	63	61	65	75	81	83	78	67	68	71	71
Mean monthly sunshine hours	161.2	193.3	232.7	216.7	238.9	235.9	231.0	211.6	207.9	183.8	150.5	143.6	2,407.1
Percentage possible sunshine	58	66	63	53	51	50	49	49	56	55	54	54	55
Source: China Meteorological Administration
