= Huachi County =

Huachi County 华池县
- County
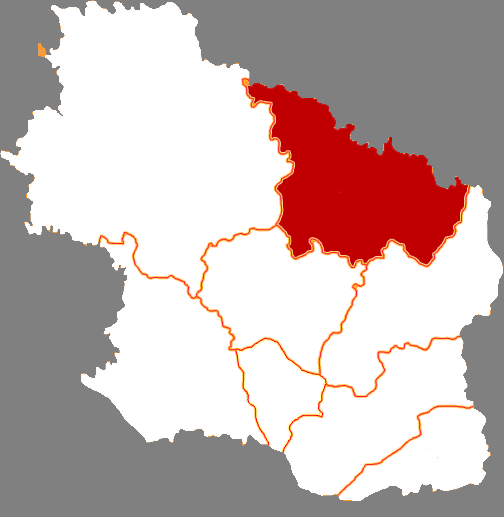
- Huachi in Qingyang

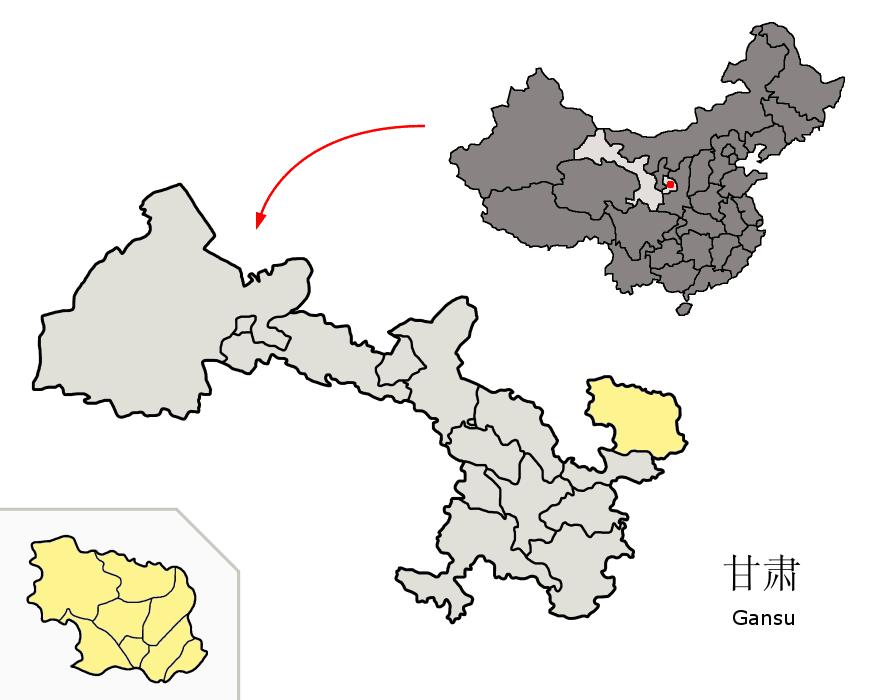
- Qingyang in Gansu
- Coordinates: 36°27′41″N 107°59′24″E
- Country: China
- Province: Gansu
- Prefecture-level city: Qingyang
- County seat: Rouyuan

Area
  - Total: 3,791 km^{2} (1,464 sq mi)
- Highest elevation: 1,780 m (5,840 ft)
- Lowest elevation: 1,100 m (3,600 ft)

Population (2018)
  - Total: 138,680
  - Density: 36.58/km^{2} (94.75/sq mi)
- Time zone: UTC+8 (China Standard)
- Postal code: 745600
- Website: www.hcx.gov.cn

Huachi County (simplified Chinese: 华池县; traditional Chinese: 華池縣; pinyin: Huáchí Xiàn) is a county in the east of Gansu province, China, bordering Shaanxi province to the north and northeast. It is under the administration of the prefecture-level city of Qingyang. Its postal code is 745600, and its population in 2018 was 138,680 people. Huachi has a low population density and is one of the poorer counties of China, partly because of the dry climate.

Parts of the Qin Great Wall run through Huachi. Huachi was established as a county during the Western Wei dynasty. During the Five Dynasties period it was abolished, becoming part of neighbouring counties. In 1934 it was re-established. During the first encirclement campaign against the Shaanxi–Gansu Soviet it was home to the Nanliang communist base.

Huachi's important agricultural produce includes white melon seeds, daylily, wood ear mushroom and millets.

== Administrative divisions ==
Huachi County is divided to 6 towns and 9 townships.

Towns

- Yuele (悦乐镇)
- Rouyuan (柔远镇)
- Yuancheng (元城镇)
- Nanliang (南梁镇)
- Chenghao (城壕镇)
- Wujiao (五蛟镇)

Townships

- Shangliyuan Township (上里塬乡)
- Wangzuizi Township (王咀子乡)
- Baima Township (白马乡)
- Huai'an Township (怀安乡)
- Qiaochuan Township (乔川乡)
- Qiaohe Township (乔河乡)
- Shanzhuang Township (山庄乡)
- Linzhen Township (林镇乡)
- Zifangpan Township (紫坊畔乡)

== Climate ==
Climate data for Huachi, elevation 1,271 m (4,170 ft), (1991–2020 normals, extremes 1981–2010)
Month	Jan	Feb	Mar	Apr	May	Jun	Jul	Aug	Sep	Oct	Nov	Dec	Year
Record high °C (°F)	14.1 (57.4)	19.4 (66.9)	27.0 (80.6)	34.5 (94.1)	34.5 (94.1)	37.7 (99.9)	38.0 (100.4)	34.2 (93.6)	34.8 (94.6)	27.2 (81.0)	23.0 (73.4)	15.6 (60.1)	38.0 (100.4)
Mean daily maximum °C (°F)	2.2 (36.0)	6.0 (42.8)	11.9 (53.4)	19.0 (66.2)	23.8 (74.8)	27.8 (82.0)	29.0 (84.2)	27.0 (80.6)	21.9 (71.4)	16.2 (61.2)	9.8 (49.6)	3.8 (38.8)	16.5 (61.8)
Daily mean °C (°F)	−6.5 (20.3)	−2.2 (28.0)	3.9 (39.0)	10.8 (51.4)	16.1 (61.0)	20.4 (68.7)	22.4 (72.3)	20.6 (69.1)	15.3 (59.5)	8.6 (47.5)	1.5 (34.7)	−4.6 (23.7)	8.9 (47.9)
Mean daily minimum °C (°F)	−12.3 (9.9)	−8 (18)	−2.2 (28.0)	3.7 (38.7)	8.7 (47.7)	13.4 (56.1)	16.7 (62.1)	15.7 (60.3)	10.7 (51.3)	3.5 (38.3)	−3.7 (25.3)	−10.1 (13.8)	3.0 (37.5)
Record low °C (°F)	−23.1 (−9.6)	−21.0 (−5.8)	−15.9 (3.4)	−7.8 (18.0)	−2.7 (27.1)	4.6 (40.3)	8.8 (47.8)	5.2 (41.4)	−0.9 (30.4)	−9.4 (15.1)	−16.1 (3.0)	−26.5 (−15.7)	−26.5 (−15.7)
Average precipitation mm (inches)	3.1 (0.12)	5.1 (0.20)	12.4 (0.49)	26.4 (1.04)	38.2 (1.50)	60.1 (2.37)	107.5 (4.23)	100.3 (3.95)	68.9 (2.71)	35.3 (1.39)	13.4 (0.53)	2.9 (0.11)	473.6 (18.64)
Average precipitation days (≥ 0.1 mm)	3.0	4.0	5.4	6.4	7.8	10.2	12.2	11.4	11.0	7.8	4.5	2.4	86.1
Average snowy days	4.3	5.2	4.0	0.7	0	0	0	0	0	0.6	2.9	3.5	21.2
Average relative humidity (%)	58	57	54	50	52	58	68	74	76	74	67	61	62
Mean monthly sunshine hours	180.4	168.1	191.6	214.0	235.1	229.1	217.7	197.6	156.4	169.5	168.9	172.9	2,301.3
Percentage possible sunshine	58	54	51	54	54	52	49	48	43	49	56	58	52
Source: China Meteorological Administration

== See also ==
- List of administrative divisions of Gansu
