= Wenquan Township, Qinghai =

Qukoi Township 温泉乡 · ཆུ་ཁོལ་ཞང་། Wenquan
- Township
- Location in Qinghai
- Coordinates: 35°12′54″N 99°39′57″E
- Country: China
- Province: Qinghai
- Prefecture: Hainan
- County: Xinghai

Area
  - Total: 3,355.32 km^{2} (1,295.50 sq mi)
- Elevation: 3,440 m (11,290 ft)

Population (2017)
  - Total: 9,312
  - Density: 2.775/km^{2} (7.188/sq mi)
- Time zone: UTC+8 (China Standard)

Qukoi Township (Tibetan: ཆུ་ཁོལ་ཞང་།) or Wenquan Township (Chinese: 温泉乡) is a township in Xinghai County, Hainan Tibetan Autonomous Prefecture, in the east of Qinghai province, China. The township has seven village committees within it. Rain water samples have been taken at an altitude of 3,933 metres (12,904 ft) within the township.
