= Changjiang Li Autonomous County =

Changjiang 昌江县 Ch'ang-chiang, Cheongkong
- Autonomous County
- 昌江黎族自治县; Changjiang Li Autonomous County
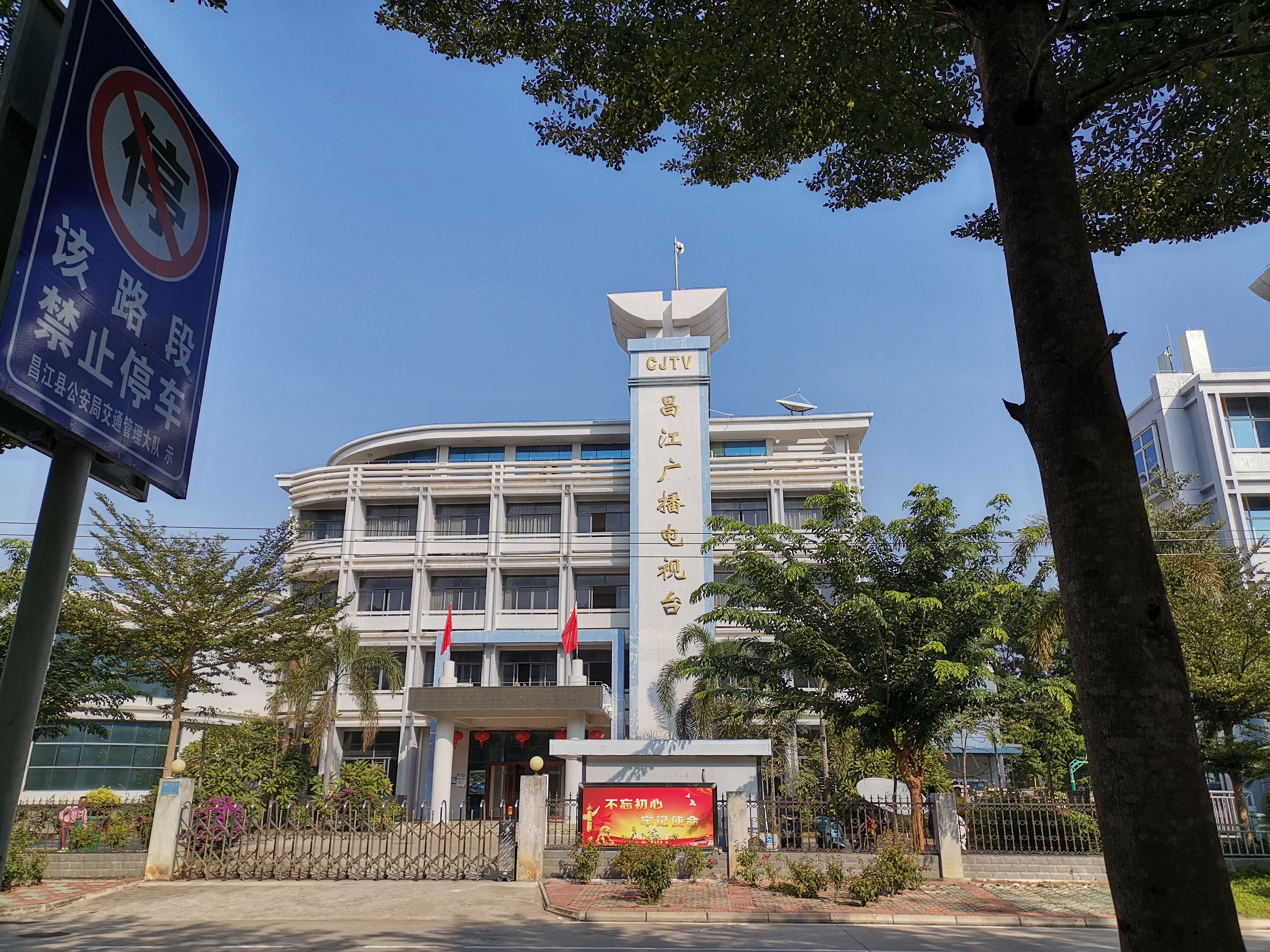

- Location in Hainan
- Coordinates: 19°21′58″N 109°2′32″E
- Country: People's Republic of China
- Province: Hainan
- County seat: Shilu Town

Area
  - Total: 1,617 km^{2} (624 sq mi)

Population (1999)
  - Total: 225,131
  - Density: 139.2/km^{2} (360.6/sq mi)

Demographics
  - Ethnic composition: Han; Li; Miao
  - Languages and dialects: Standard Chinese, Hainanese, Gelong, Lingao, Danzhou dialect, Hlai, Miao, Yue
- Time zone: UTC+8 (China standard time)

Changjiang Li Autonomous County (formerly known by its Cantonese romanization name Cheongkong) is an autonomous county in Hainan, China. It is one of the six counties of Hainan. Its postal code is 572700, and in 1999 its population was 225,131 people, largely made up of the Li people.

The county seat is in Shilu Town. Shilu is known for a major iron ore deposit (the Shilu Iron Ore Mine, 石碌铁矿), which has been worked since the Japanese occupation of the island in the early 1940s.

== Geography ==
Changjiang lies along the northwestern fringes of the Wuzhi Mountains, with terrain descending from the southeast to the northwest and elevations reaching up to 1654 metres.

== Climate ==
Changjiang has a tropical savanna climate (Aw). The monthly high temperature exceeds 25.3 °C (77.5 °F). The rainy season is from May to October, and the monthly precipitation exceeds 170mm (6.74 in). The Bawangling National Nature Reserve within the territory is home to endangered Hainan gibbons.

Climate data for Changjiang, elevation 98 m (322 ft), (1991–2020 normals, extremes 1975–present)
Month	Jan	Feb	Mar	Apr	May	Jun	Jul	Aug	Sep	Oct	Nov	Dec	Year
Record high °C (°F)	34.9 (94.8)	37.4 (99.3)	39.9 (103.8)	41.6 (106.9)	39.1 (102.4)	38.5 (101.3)	38.8 (101.8)	39.0 (102.2)	37.0 (98.6)	35.3 (95.5)	34.2 (93.6)	32.9 (91.2)	41.6 (106.9)
Mean daily maximum °C (°F)	25.3 (77.5)	26.9 (80.4)	30.0 (86.0)	32.8 (91.0)	34.1 (93.4)	34.5 (94.1)	33.9 (93.0)	33.0 (91.4)	31.9 (89.4)	30.3 (86.5)	28.2 (82.8)	25.3 (77.5)	30.5 (86.9)
Daily mean °C (°F)	19.6 (67.3)	20.9 (69.6)	23.6 (74.5)	26.8 (80.2)	28.6 (83.5)	29.6 (85.3)	28.9 (84.0)	28.1 (82.6)	27.0 (80.6)	25.7 (78.3)	23.5 (74.3)	20.5 (68.9)	25.2 (77.4)
Mean daily minimum °C (°F)	16.1 (61.0)	17.2 (63.0)	19.7 (67.5)	22.8 (73.0)	24.9 (76.8)	26.1 (79.0)	25.6 (78.1)	25.0 (77.0)	24.0 (75.2)	22.6 (72.7)	20.4 (68.7)	17.5 (63.5)	21.8 (71.3)
Record low °C (°F)	7.2 (45.0)	8.5 (47.3)	6.5 (43.7)	14.6 (58.3)	17.6 (63.7)	19.6 (67.3)	20.4 (68.7)	20.2 (68.4)	19.0 (66.2)	14.1 (57.4)	10.8 (51.4)	4.2 (39.6)	4.2 (39.6)
Average precipitation mm (inches)	7.5 (0.30)	10.8 (0.43)	27.7 (1.09)	73.1 (2.88)	171.1 (6.74)	180.9 (7.12)	295.6 (11.64)	407.6 (16.05)	330.7 (13.02)	175.0 (6.89)	52.1 (2.05)	16.2 (0.64)	1,748.3 (68.85)
Average precipitation days (≥ 0.1 mm)	3.1	3.0	5.0	7.3	12.6	10.5	14.8	17.4	18.5	12.5	6.0	3.7	114.4
Average relative humidity (%)	75	75	74	73	72	71	74	78	81	77	75	74	75
Mean monthly sunshine hours	162.4	158.2	179.6	201.9	223.6	219.7	214.4	198.4	166.3	185.0	174.9	152.7	2,237.1
Percentage possible sunshine	47	49	48	53	55	55	53	51	46	51	52	45	50
Source: China Meteorological Administration all-time extreme all-time October record

== See also ==
- List of administrative divisions of Hainan
