= Territorial disputes of China =

Overview of territories claimed by China

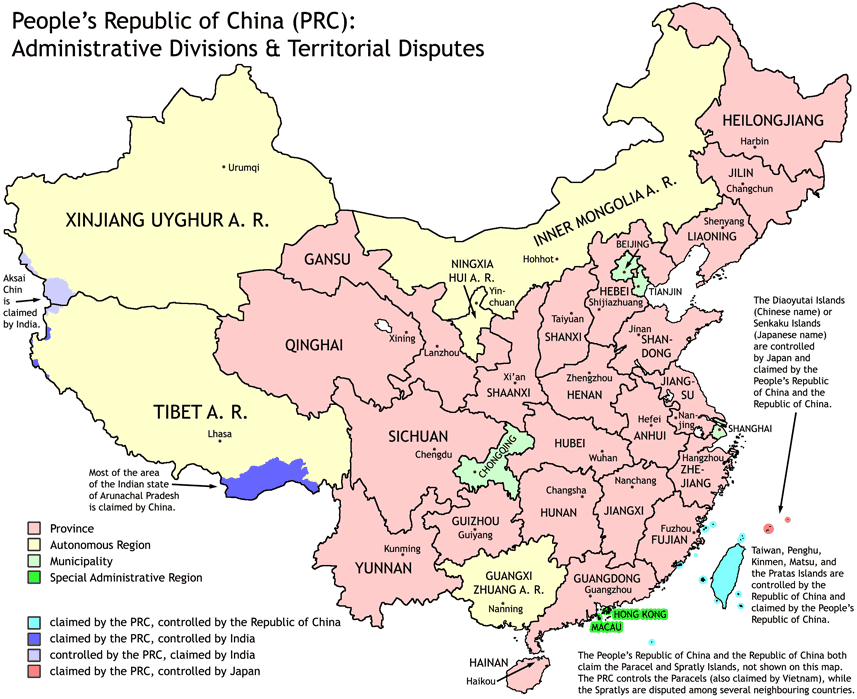
Disputed territories of People's Republic of China with its adjacent countries

The People's Republic of China (PRC) has a number of territorial disputes. Many of these disputes are almost identical to those that the Republic of China historically had with other countries prior to its retreat to Taiwan. Certain Chinese claims to disputed maritime territories date from prior to the 1949 proclamation of the People's Republic of China.

== Background ==
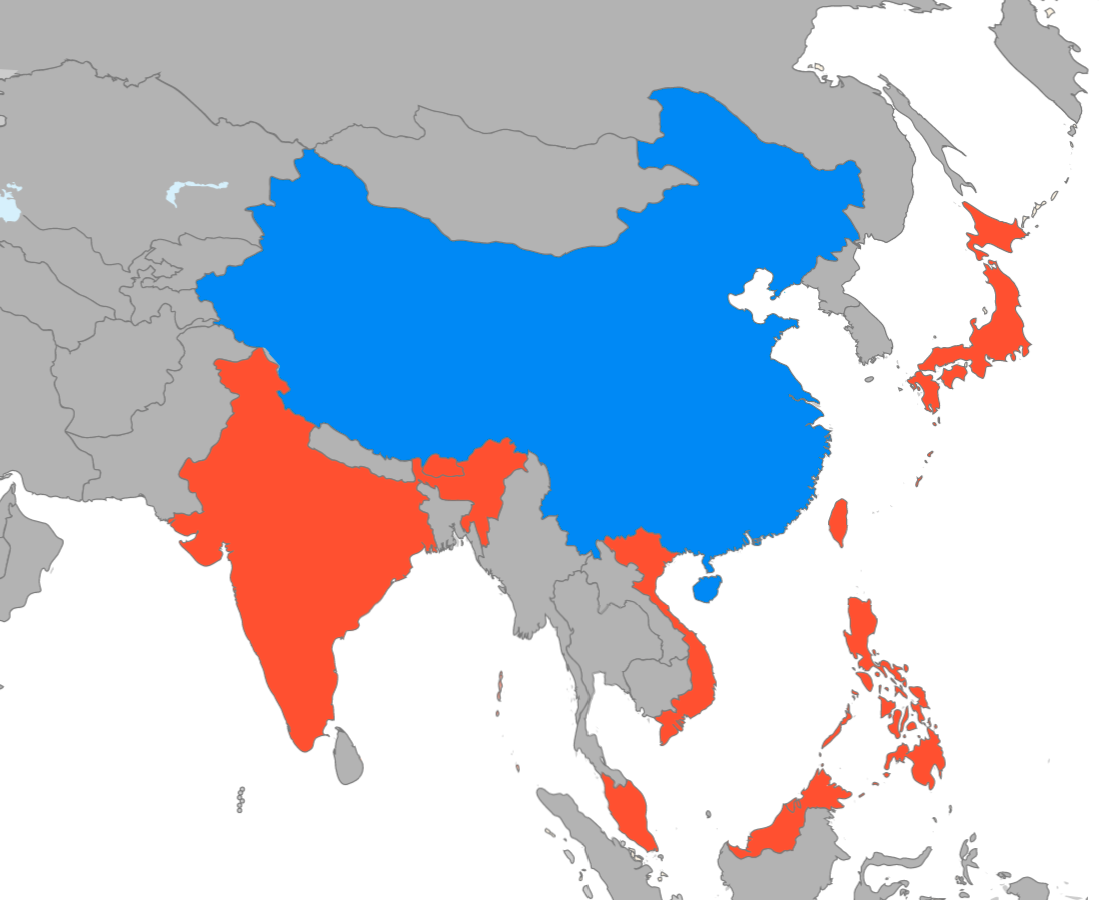
PRC (blue) and countries/territories it has territorial disputes with (red) as of 2026

The asserted territory of China largely corresponds to that of the Qing empire. Many of the PRC's disputes are also almost identical to those that the Republic of China historically had with other countries prior to its retreat to Taiwan. In its 1914 constitution, the Republic of China had asserted, "The territory of the Chinese Republic continues the same as that of the former empire." The 1931 provisional constitution of the Republic of China stated, "The territory of the Republic of China includes all the provinces, Mongolia, and Tibet." Certain Chinese claims to disputed maritime territories also predate the 1949 proclamation of the People's Republic of China.

== Current disputes ==
=== Bhutan ===
Map of Bhutan, with disputed borders in red

Bhutan's border with Tibet has never been officially recognized, much less demarcated. The Republic of China based in Taiwan officially maintains a territorial claim on parts of Bhutan to this day. The territorial claim was maintained by the People's Republic of China after the Chinese Communist Party took control of mainland China in the Chinese Civil War.

The 1959 Tibetan Rebellion and the 14th Dalai Lama's arrival in neighboring India made the security of Bhutan's border with China a necessity for Bhutan. An estimated 6,000 Tibetans fled to Bhutan and were granted asylum, although Bhutan subsequently closed its border to China, fearing more refugees to come. In July 1959, along with the occupation of Tibet, the Chinese People's Liberation Army occupied several Bhutanese exclaves in western Tibet which were under Bhutanese administration for more than 300 years and had been given to Bhutan by Ngawang Namgyal in the 17th century. These included Darchen, Labrang Monastery, Gartok and several smaller monasteries and villages near Mount Kailas.

In 1983, the Chinese Foreign Minister Wu Xueqian and the Bhutanese Foreign Minister Dawa Tsering held talks on establishing bilateral relations in New York. In 1984, China and Bhutan began annual, direct talks over the border dispute. In 1998, China and Bhutan signed a bilateral agreement for maintaining peace on the border. In the agreement, China affirmed its respect for Bhutan's sovereignty and territorial integrity and both sides sought to build ties based on the Five Principles of Peaceful Co-existence. However, China's building of roads on what Bhutan asserts to be Bhutanese territory, allegedly in violation of the 1998 agreement, has provoked tensions. In 2002, however, China presented what it claimed to be 'evidence', asserting its ownership of disputed tracts of land; after negotiations, an interim agreement was reached.

On 11 August 2016, Bhutan Foreign Minister Damcho Dorji visited Beijing, the capital of China, for the 24th round of boundary talks with Chinese Vice President Li Yuanchao. Both sides made comments to show their readiness to strengthen cooperation in various fields and their hope of settling the boundary issues. In 2024, The New York Times reported that, according to satellite imagery, China had constructed villages inside of disputed territory within Bhutan. Chinese individuals, called "border guardians," received annual subsidies to relocate to newly built villages and paid to conduct border patrols.

=== India ===
Disputed regions with India around Tibet Autonomous Region

China and India have various ongoing territorial disputes. The disputes stem from the historical consequences of colonialism in Asia and the lack of clear historical boundary demarcations. There was one historical attempt to set a proposed boundary, the McMahon Line, by Great Britain during the 1913–1914 Simla Convention. The Republic of China rejected the proposed boundary. The unresolved dispute over the boundary became contentious after India gained its independence in 1947 and the People's Republic of China was established in 1949. The disputed borders are complicated by the lack of administrative presence in the disputed areas, which are remote.

India claims Aksai Chin, which is administered by China. During the 1950s, the People's Republic of China built a 1,200 km (750 mi) road connecting Xinjiang and western Tibet, of which 179 km (112 mi) ran south of the Johnson Line through the Aksai Chin region claimed by India. Aksai Chin was easily accessible to the Chinese, but was more difficult for the Indians on the other side of the Karakorams to reach. The Indians did not learn of the existence of the road until 1957, which was confirmed when the road was shown in Chinese maps published in 1958.

The Depsang Plains are located on the border of the Indian union territory of Ladakh and the disputed zone of Aksai Chin. The People's Liberation Army occupied most of the plains during its 1962 war with India, while India controls the western portion of the plains. The dispute remains unresolved.

Arunachal Pradesh is a state of India created on 20 January 1972, located in the far northeast. It borders the states of Assam and Nagaland to the south, and shares international borders with Myanmar in the east, Bhutan in the west, and China in the north. The majority of the territory is claimed by China, by whom it is called South Tibet. The northern border of Arunachal Pradesh reflects the McMahon Line, a line demarcated by the 1914 Simla Convention between the United Kingdom and the Tibetan government. The Simla Convention was never accepted by the Chinese government, and it was also considered invalid by Tibetans due to unmet conditions specified in the treaty. The boundary was not broadly enforced by the Indian government until 1950. Currently, this territory is administered by India.

=== Japan ===
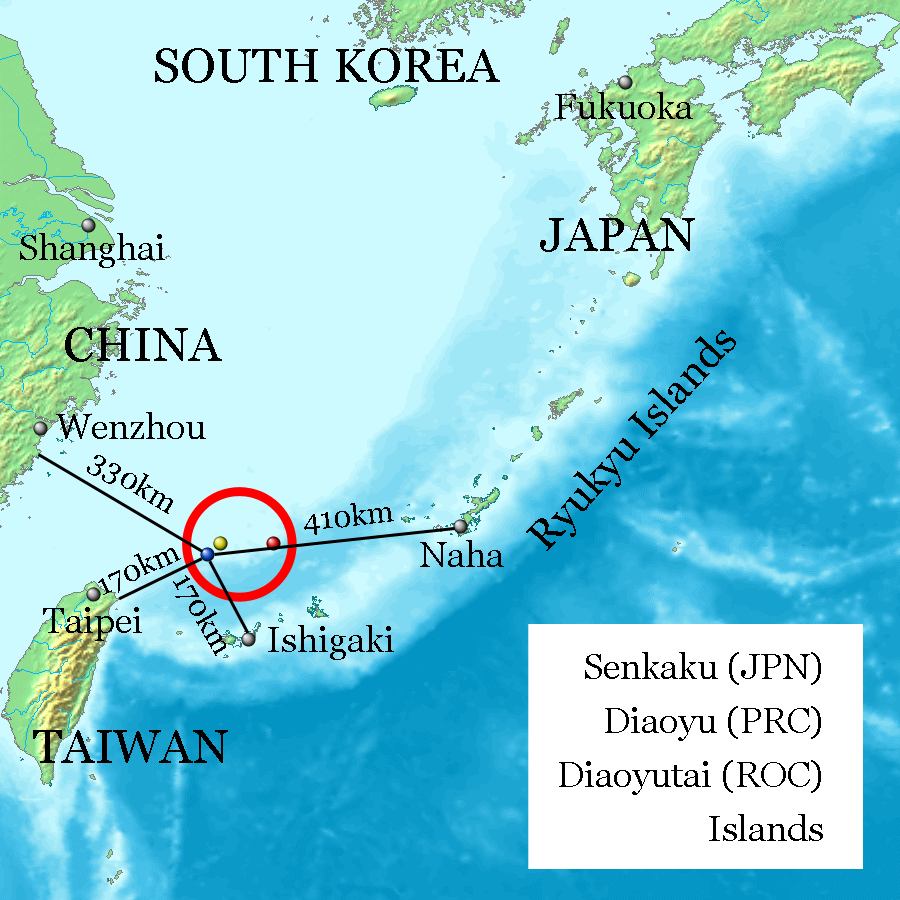
Map of Senkaku/Diaoyu Islands

China and Japan have a territorial dispute over a group of uninhabited islands known as the Senkaku Islands in Japan, the Diaoyu Islands in the People's Republic of China (PRC), and Tiaoyutai Islands in the Republic of China (ROC or Taiwan). Aside from a 1945 to 1972 period of administration by the United States as part of the Ryukyu Islands, the archipelago has been controlled by Japan since 1895. According to Lee Seokwoo, the People's Republic of China started taking up the question of sovereignty over the islands in the latter half of 1970 when evidence relating to the existence of oil reserves surfaced. The Republic of China also claims the islands. The territory is close to key shipping lanes and rich fishing grounds, and there may be oil reserves in the area.

Japan argues that it surveyed the islands in the late 19th century and found them to be terra nullius (Latin: land belonging to no one); subsequently, China acquiesced to Japanese sovereignty until the 1970s. The PRC and the ROC argue that documentary evidence prior to the First Sino-Japanese War indicates Chinese possession and that the territory is accordingly a Japanese seizure that should be returned as the rest of Imperial Japan's conquests were returned in 1945.

The islands are included within the Treaty of Mutual Cooperation and Security between the United States and Japan, meaning that a defense of the islands by Japan would require the United States to come to Japan's aid.

In September 2012, the Japanese government purchased three of the disputed islands from their private owner, prompting large-scale protests in China. As of early February 2013, the situation has been regarded as "the most serious for Sino-Japanese relations in the post-war period in terms of the risk of militarized conflict."

=== South China Sea ===
The PRC and ROC claimed sovereignty over an area surrounding shoals and islands in the South China Sea, as well as a historical right over the area within the nine-dash line. In 1932, China sent a Note Verbale to France, declaring that China's southernmost territory was the Paracels. In 1933, when France occupied six features in the Spratlys, China did not protest as it recognized the year before that its southernmost territory was limited to the Paracels.

In the 1970s, the discovery of the potential for petroleum resources in the South China Sea prompted an increase in occupation activity by claimants. From 1971 to 1973, the Philippines began occupying five features and South Vietnam began occupying six. Concerned that its claims would be weakened by the activity of other claimants, China increased its physical presence in the area. It conducted surveys around the Paracels and the People's Liberation Army Navy built a harbor and wharf on Wood Island (in the Paracels) in 1971.

In 1974, China and South Vietnam fought the Battle of the Paracel Islands. China took a defensive posture, directing its forces "not to fire the first shot; fight back when attacked". The battle was relatively brief and China defeated South Vietnam. China moved quickly to consolidate its position in the area and has maintained control of the Paracel Islands since.

The 2012 Scarborough Shoal fishing dispute and resulting standoff between China and the Philippines prompted the Philippines to initiate the South China Sea Arbitration in 2013. China declined to participate in the arbitration and stated that it would not accept any arbitration result. As part of its grounds for nonparticipation and nonacceptance, China cited the fact that China is a signatory to the 2006 UNCLOS exclusion clause which removes sovereignty and boundary delimitations issues from arbitration procedures. Because China did not participate, the arbitrators based their view of the Chinese position on China's 2014 white paper and letters sent to the tribunal from China's ambassador to the Netherlands. In 2016, the nine-dash line created by China was declared as invalid by the South China Sea Arbitration ruling.

==== Citizen survey in China ====
A 2013 survey of Chinese adults found that respondents who sourced their information about the dispute from traditional mass media (which are more subject to state regulation) were less supportive of the idea that China should adopt hardline policies in the South China Sea. The researchers who conducted the survey concluded that China's state-media coverage of the dispute was "more of a dampener than a driver of nationalistic policy preference."

=== Taiwan ===
The PRC claims the de jure administration of Taiwan Province, as well as mainland-nearby islands of Kinmen and Matsu Islands, currently controlled by the Republic of China. However, despite the diplomatic stalemate between the governments in Beijing and Taipei, both governments agree on many of the same territorial disputes, namely the Senkaku Islands and the nine-dash line, or the eleven-dash line in the case of the ROC.

== Resolved disputes ==
China was generally generous in resolving disputes with its southwest neighbors. According to academic Swaran Singh, China's generosity was likely motivated by the security concern of reducing foreign support for disgruntled groups within China's southwest border.

In Central Asia, the newly independent states following the dissolution of the Soviet Union inherited the border disagreements with China, which had themselves been inherited from Tsarist Russia and the Qing dynasty. China negotiated bilaterally to resolve its borders with these conflicts. Ultimately, China obtained significantly less Central Asian territory than what it had originally claimed. Resolution of these disputes on territorial terms generally favorable to the Central Asian countries created goodwill for China, avoided conflict, and also resulted in recognition that the czarist era borders were imposed unjustly on China.

=== Hong Kong ===
Starting in July 1983, the Chinese and British government delegations began negotiations on the future of Hong Kong. On December 19, 1984, China and Britain signed the Sino-British Joint Declaration on the Question of Hong Kong in Beijing. On July 1, 1997, the People's Republic of China resumed the exercise of sovereignty over Hong Kong.

=== Kazakhstan ===
After the dissolution of the Soviet Union, Kazakhstan became an independent country, and around 2,420 square kilometers of land was disputed with China. A border treaty between the two nations was signed in Almaty on April 26, 1994, and ratified by the Kazakh president on June 15, 1995. China received around 22% of the total disputed territory, and Kazakhstan received the remaining 78%.

=== Kyrgyzstan ===
When Kyrgyzstan became independent in 1991 after the Soviet Union's dissolution, it inherited a section of the USSR-China frontier. The two countries delimited their border in 1996. Formal demarcation was hampered by opposition to the border treaty by the Kyrgyz opposition, centred on Azimbek Beknazarov, as part of a wider movement against the ex-President Askar Akayev culminating in the Tulip Revolution. The border agreement was finalized in 2009, with China giving up part of the Khan Tengri Peak while Kyrgyzstan ceded the Uzengi-Kush, a mountainous area located south of the Issyk Kul region.

=== Laos ===
Laos obtained a partial independence from France in 1949, around the time when the People's Republic of China was established after defeating the nationalist government in the Chinese Civil War. The boundary then became one between two sovereign independent states. The border was re-surveyed and demarcated in April 1992.

=== Macau ===
On December 3, 1966, the 12-3 incident occurred in Macau. On April 25, 1974, the Portuguese Army launched the Carnation Revolution. The new Portuguese civilian government implemented a decolonization policy and recognized that Macau was not a colony but Chinese territory. At that time, it also hoped to return the sovereignty of Macau immediately, but was rejected by the government of the People's Republic of China. It was not until February 8, 1979, that Portugal and the People's Republic of China officially exchanged the "Communiqué on the Establishment of Diplomatic Relations". Both sides jointly confirmed that Macau was Chinese territory, and the time and details of the return would be negotiated and resolved by the two governments at an appropriate time. On June 30, 1986, the two sides began negotiations on the return of Macau. On April 13, 1987, the two sides signed the Sino-Portuguese Joint Declaration. On December 20, 1999, the People's Republic of China resumed the exercise of sovereignty over Macau.

=== Mongolia ===
The People's Republic of China established diplomatic relations with Mongolia on October 16, 1949, and both nations signed a border treaty in 1962. With the Sino-Soviet split, Mongolia aligned itself with the Soviet Union and asked for the deployment of Soviet forces, leading to security concerns in China. As a result, bilateral ties remained tense until 1984, when a high-level Chinese delegation visited Mongolia and both nations began to survey and demarcate their borders. Mongolian General Secretary Jambyn Batmönkh, during a meeting with President Kim Il sung while on a state visit to Pyongyang in November 1986 states that "renewing the development of Sino-Mongolian relations is important for our two countries’ people's common interest". In 1986, a series of agreements to bolster trade and establish transport and air links was signed.

=== Myanmar ===
The boundary area between China and Burma (Myanmar) is inhabited by non-Han and non-Burmese peoples, and has been traditionally kept as a buffer region between the various Chinese and Burmese empires. During the 19th century the British, based in India, began occupying Myanmar (then referred to as Burma), gradually incorporating it into British India. Their advance close to lands traditionally claimed by China pushed the two sides into negotiating a boundary treaty in 1894, which covered the southern half of the boundary as far north as the vicinity of Myitkyina, exclusive of the Wa States. Sections of this border were demarcated and marked on the ground from 1897 to 1900. In 1941 a border running through the Wa States area was agreed upon following on-the-ground surveys conducted in the 1930s, though no agreement on the northern stretch was reached, with China claiming much of what is now northern Myanmar. Meanwhile, Burma was separated from India and became a separate colony in 1937, gaining full independence in 1948.

During the Second World War the Burma Road was constructed across the border as an Allied supply line to Chinese forces fighting the Empire of Japan. Additionally in 1941, following Japan's invasion of Burma, parts of Burma were ceded to Siam as the Saharat Thai Doem territory, thereby giving China a common border with Thailand, however these areas were returned to Burma in 1946 following Japan's defeat.

Discussions between Burma and China over the border began in 1954, with China keen to control the area more effectively as it was being used as a base by Kuomintang troops. On 28 January 1960 a treaty was signed which delimited most of the border, which was later completed with a full delimitation treaty signed on 1 October 1960, with both sides ceding small areas along the border. The two sides then demarcated the border on the ground in the following year.

Since then relations between the two states have remained largely cordial, though the border region has at times been volatile owing to the ongoing insurgencies in Myanmar's Kachin and Shan states. In recent years several towns along the border, such as Mong La, Ruili and Muse, have become centers of gambling, prostitution and drug smuggling.

=== Nepal ===
Several treaties were negotiated between Nepal and Tibet (Qing China) in the 18th and 19th centuries, however they were often vague or contradictory. After the founding of the People's Republic of China in 1949, the Chinese and Nepalese governments signed three border agreements in 1960, 1961 and 1963. A Joint Commission was created to define and demarcate the border.

Nepali opposition claims Nepal and China have an ongoing border dispute over the territory along the Himalayan border. However, both of the current governments of China and Nepal deny the accusation.

=== North Korea ===
China and North Korea share a 1,416 km long land border that corresponds almost entirely to the course of the Yalu and Tumen rivers. The two countries signed a border treaty in 1962 to resolve their un-demarcated land border. China received 40% of the disputed crater lake on Paektu Mountain (known as Changbai Mountain in China), while North Korea held the remaining area.

=== Pakistan ===
A solution to the two countries' border dispute was negotiated in 1950s. The Sino-Pakistan Agreement (also known as the Sino-Pakistan Frontier Agreement and Sino-Pak Boundary Agreement) is a 1963 document between the governments of Pakistan and China establishing the border between those countries. It resulted in Pakistan ceding 5,300 km^{2} (2,050 sq mi) to China and China ceding over 1,900 km^{2} (750 sq mi) to Pakistan.

=== Russia ===
In 1991, China and USSR signed the 1991 Sino-Soviet Border Agreement, which intended to start the process of resolving the border disputes held in abeyance since the 1960s. However, just a few months later the USSR was dissolved, and four former Soviet republics — Russia, Kazakhstan, Kyrgyzstan, and Tajikistan — inherited various sections of the former Sino–Soviet border.

It took more than a decade for Russia and China to fully resolve the border issues and to demarcate the border. On May 29, 1994, during Russian Prime Minister Chernomyrdin's visit to Beijing, an "Agreement on the Sino-Russian Border Management System intended to facilitate border trade and hinder criminal activity" was signed. On September 3, a demarcation agreement was signed for the short (55 kilometres (34 mi)) western section of the binational border; the demarcation of this section was completed in 1998.

The last unresolved territorial issue between the two countries was settled by the 2004 Complementary Agreement between the People's Republic of China and the Russian Federation on the Eastern Section of the China–Russia Boundary. Pursuant to that agreement, Russia transferred to China a part of Abagaitu Islet, the entire Yinlong (Tarabarov) Island, about half of Bolshoy Ussuriysky Island, and some adjacent river islets. The transfer has been ratified by both the Chinese National People's Congress and the Russian State Duma in 2005, thus ending the decades-long border dispute. The official transfer ceremony was held on-site on October 14, 2008. However, in China Standard Map Edition 2023, Bolshoy Ussuriysky Island has been speculated by some journalists to be asserted as Chinese territory by China.

=== Tajikistan ===
China had a longstanding territorial claim on about 28,430 square kilometers (10,977 square miles) of Tajik territory since 1884, which was taken from the then Qing dynasty by unequal treaties.

In 2011, as part of a boundary agreement, China officially relinquished its claim on 96% of the total disputed territory, while Tajikistan ceded around 4% – about 1,137 square km (439 square miles) – to China.

=== Vietnam ===
On December 30, 1999, the China-Vietnam Land Boundary Treaty was signed, formally demarcating a 1,347-kilometer-long common land border. Of the 227 square kilometers of disputed areas, 114 square kilometers were assigned to China and 113 square kilometers to Vietnam. The sea border continues to be disputed.

== See also ==
- Chinese salami slicing strategy
- Debt trap diplomacy
- East China Sea EEZ disputes
  - Territorial disputes of Japan
- Foreign relations of China
- Territorial changes of the People's Republic of China
- Borders of China
- Map of National Shame
