= Territorial changes of the People's Republic of China =

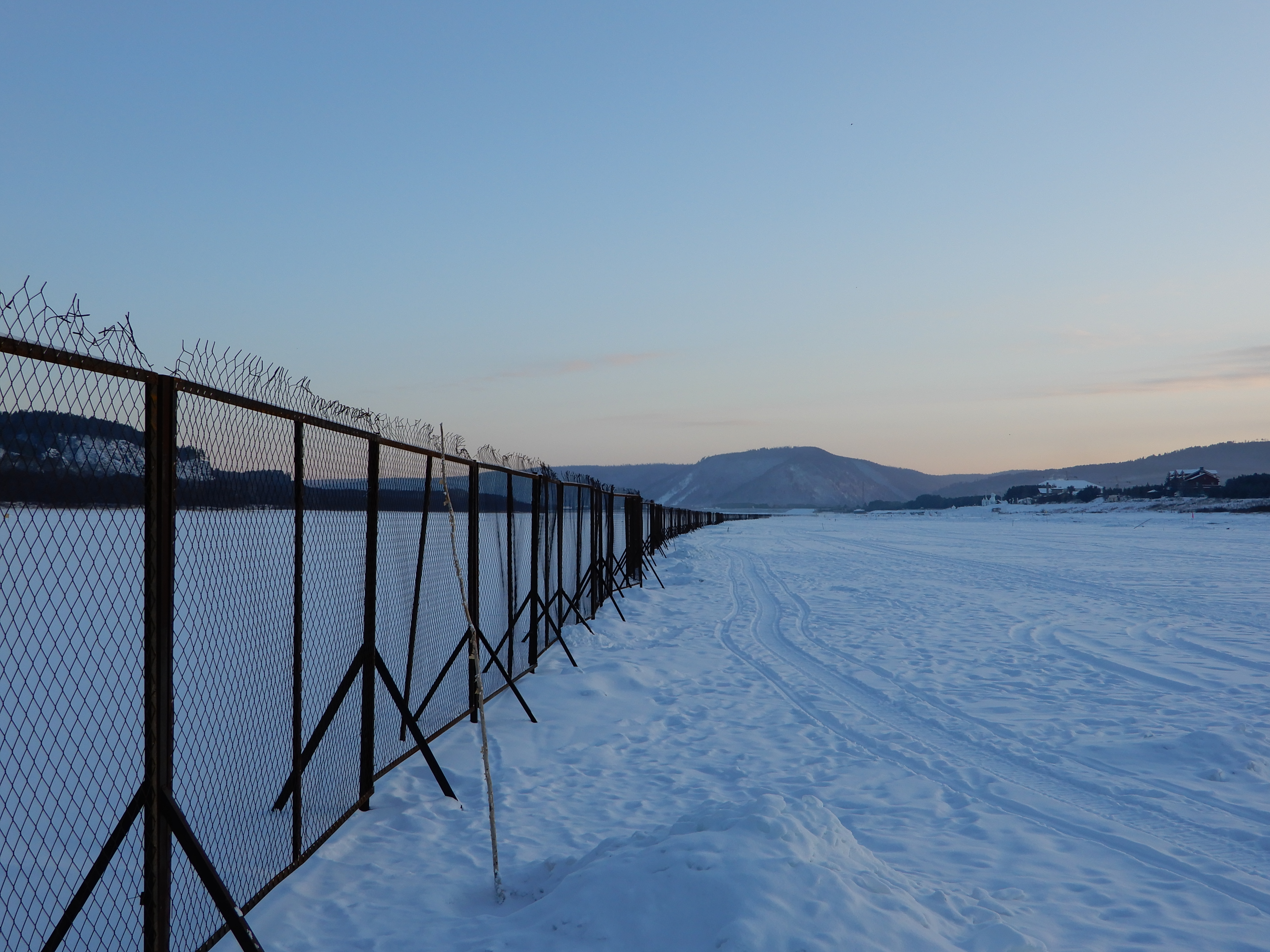
China's current northernmost border stays at Center of Amur in the north of Mohe City

The territory of the People's Republic of China (PRC) has frequently been revised since its formation on 1 October 1949.

Until 1986, the total territory (or under control) of the PRC was 10.45 million km^{2}, including:

- Continental mainland: ~9.60 million km^{2}
- Islands and reefs: ~75,400 km^{2}
- Coastal beaches and shoaly lands: ~12,700 km^{2}
- Inner sea (mainly Bohai Sea): ~693,000 km^{2}
- Territorial (sea only) waters: ~220,000 km^{2}

During the 1990s and 2000s, the official size and value of China's territory are rarely officially declared or published.

The Republic of China (ROC) government on Taiwan does not recognize the PRC's territorial changes to the 1947 ROC constitution (although amended in 1991 to include the ROC's free area).

== Chronological list ==
=== 1949–1959 ===
- 1 October 1949, the People's Republic of China is proclaimed by Mao Zedong (ruled from 1949 until 1976) at Tiananmen in Beijing.
- 13 October 1949, Xinjiang is annexed by the People's Republic of China.
- 1 May 1950, the Island of Hainan was taken under full control by the PLA.
- 19 May 1950, the largest archipelago of China - Zhoushan, was taken under full control of PLA.
- 23 May 1951, the area of Tibet Autonomous Region was claimed by the People's Republic of China.
- 3 September 1954, The People's Republic of China annexed the Yijiangshan Islands and Dachen Islands from the Republic of China during the First Taiwan Strait Crisis (Battle of Yijiangshan) even as the U.S. Seventh Fleet was patrolling nearby.

=== 1960–1969 ===
- On 12 October 1962, China signed the Sino–North Korean Border Treaty. It and a following treaty in 1964 effectively ceded around 280 km^{2} of territory on and around Paektu Mountain, and 54.5% of the mountain's Heaven Lake to North Korea.
- 21 November 1962, China won the military victory of Sino-Indian War but withdrew to the pre-war boundaries. Since then, India maintains control of North-East Frontier Agency area i.e. Arunachal Pradesh (83,743 km^{2}); China controls areas of Aksai Chin (~30,000 /33,444/37,555 km^{2}) and Trans-Karakoram Tract (5,181/5,180 km^{2}). See article: Sino-Indian War.
- 1969, after Sino-Soviet border conflict, Soviet Union controlled Zhenbao Island (see article: Sino-Soviet border conflict). (Extra mark: Control of Zhenbao Island later was granted to China in the 2000s, see article: 1991 Sino-Russian border agreement).

=== 1970–1979 ===
- 25 October 1971, The People's Republic of China replaced the Republic of China (in Taiwan) in the UN seat representing China. The PRC claims Taiwan and Penghu as its own Taiwan Province along with fragments of Kinmen and Matsu in Fujian, despite never having gained control over it. See articles: China and the United Nations, Political status of Taiwan.
- 19 January 1974, after the Battle of the Paracel Islands, China controls over the Paracel Islands and surrounding waters. See article: Battle of the Paracel Islands.

=== 1980–1989 ===
- 14 March 1988, after the Johnson South Reef Skirmish, China started to control many reefs in the South China Sea: Fiery Cross Reef, Cuarteron Reef, Hugh Reef/Hughes Reef, Nanxun Jiao/Nanxun Reef, Subi Reef, Chinua Jiao/Chinua Reef, and surrounding waters. See article Johnson South Reef Skirmish.

=== 1990–1999 ===
- 1991, after the 1991 Sino-Russian Border Agreement, many segments of territories and islands along the border between China and Russia were transferred to China. See article: 1991 Sino-Russian Border Agreement.
- 1 July 1997, Hong Kong, leased to the British for 99 years, (1,104 km^{2}) returned to Chinese control. See article Transfer of sovereignty over Hong Kong.
- 1998–1999, the Sino-Russian-North Korean border was fixed.
- 20 December 1999, Macau (29.2 km^{2}) was handed to China. See article: Transfer of sovereignty over Macau.

=== 2000–2009 ===
- 14 October 2004 – 2 June 2005, a treaty establishing the eastern border between China and Russia was signed by China and Russia. It's said China "regained 337 km^{2}" territory. See Russian article: Демаркация российско-китайской границы (2005); Chinese article: 中华人民共和国和俄罗斯联邦关于中俄国界东段的补充协定.
- September 2008 – 2009, the border between China and Tajikistan was surveyed. It's said that China "regained more than 1,000 km^{2}".
- 31 December 2008, the borderline between China and Vietnam was determined, but detailed information hasn't yet been published.
- 2009, the artificial land (mainland China only) built by the nation would be 150 km^{2}.

=== 2010–2019 ===
- 12 January 2011, the Tajikistan parliament ratifies a deal ceding approximately 1000 square kilometers to China, while China renounces all further territorial claims in Tajikistan.
- 2012, after the Scarborough Shoal standoff, China gained control over some parts of Scarborough Shoal in the South China Sea but the claims are still going on.

== See also ==
- Land reclamations of the People's Republic of China
- Borders of China
- Territorial disputes of the People's Republic of China
