= Razdolnaya =

Razdolnaya, Suifen
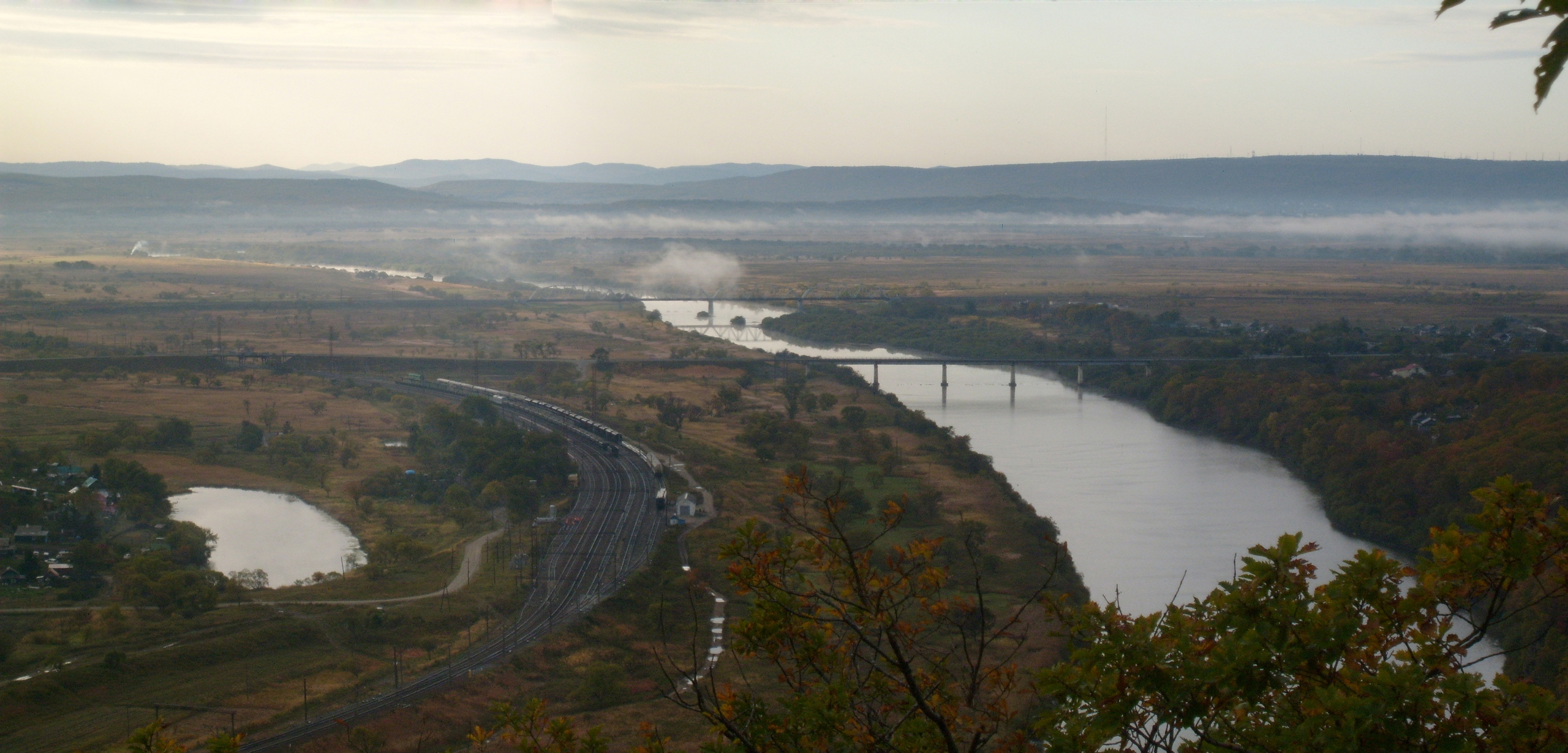

Location
- Country: People's Republic of China, Russia

Physical characteristics
- Source
  - location: Confluence of Xiaosuifen and Dasuifen rivers
  - elevation: 880 m (2,890 ft)
- Mouth: Sea of Japan
  - location: Amur Bay
  - coordinates: 43°19′32″N 131°48′28″E
  - elevation: 0 m (0 ft)
- Length: 242 km (150 mi)
- Basin size: 16,830 km^{2} (6,500 sq mi)
- Discharge
  - average: 81.3 m^{3}/s (2,870 cu ft/s) (near mouth)

The Razdolnaya (Russian: Раздольная, formerly: Суйфун Suyfun) or Suifen (simplified Chinese: 绥芬河; traditional Chinese: 綏芬河; pinyin: Suífēn Hé) is a river in People's Republic of China and Russia. It flows into the Amur Bay of the Sea of Japan.

== The name ==
Suifen is the Manchu word ᠰᡠᡳ᠌ᡶ᠋ᡠᠨ (suifun) for awl, referring to the shape of a species of Oncomelania snail.

In Russian, the river was originally known under the same Manchu / Chinese name (rendered as Суйфун (Suifun) in Russian). In 1972, in the aftermath of the Zhenbao Island incident (1969), toponyms of Chinese origin in Primorsky Krai were replaced en masse with newly designed Russian names; as part of this project, the Russian part of the Suifen received the name Razdolnaya, which can be translated from Russian as "widely flowing".

== Geography ==
The source of the Suifen is the confluence of the Xiaosuifen (Lesser Suifen) River and the Dasuifen (Greater Suifen) River in Heilongjiang.

Suifenhe City was named after the Chinese name of the river. Downstream of the city, the river enters Russian territory, and flows into Amur Bay through Khanka Lowlands.

The length of the river is 245 kilometres (152 mi), of which 191 kilometres (119 mi) is in Russia; the drainage basin covers 16,830 square kilometres (6,500 mi^{2}).

The major tributaries of the river are the Granitnaya (99 km), the Borisovka (86 km) and the Komarovka (76 km, main tributary Rakovka). The city Ussuriysk was founded in 1866 at the confluence of the Suifen and Komarovka rivers.
