= 1991 Sino-Soviet Border Agreement =

Border treaty between China and the Soviet Union

Chinese name
- Traditional Chinese: 中華人民共和國和蘇維埃社會主義共和國聯盟關於中蘇國界東段的協定
- Simplified Chinese: 中华人民共和国和苏维埃社会主义共和国联盟关于中苏国界东段的协定
Transcriptions
Standard Mandarin
- Hanyu Pinyin: Zhōnghuá rénmín gònghéguó hé Sūwéi'āi shèhuì zhǔyì gònghéguó liánméng guānyú zhōng sū guójiè dōng duàn de xiédìng
- Bopomofo: ㄓㄨㄥㄏㄨㄚ˙ㄖㄣㄇㄧㄣ˙ㄍㄨㄥㄏㄜㄍㄨㄛ˙ㄏㄜ˙ㄙㄨ˙ㄨㄟ˙ㄞ˙ㄕㄜㄏㄨㄟㄓㄨㄧ˙ㄍㄨㄥㄏㄜㄍㄨㄛ˙ㄌㄧㄢㄇㄥ˙ㄍㄨㄢㄩ˙ㄓㄨㄥ˙ㄙㄨ˙ㄍㄨㄛ˙ㄐㄧㄝ˙ㄉㄨㄥ˙ㄉㄨㄢ˙ㄉㄜ˙ㄒㄧㄝㄉㄧㄥ˙
- Wade–Giles: Chung¹-hua² jen²-min² kung⁴-ho²-kuo² ho² su¹-wei² she⁴-hui⁴ chu³-i⁴ kung⁴-ho²-kuo² lien²-meng² kuan¹-yü² chung¹ su¹ kuo²-chieh⁴ tung¹ tuan⁴ te hsieh²-ting⁴
- Tongyong Pinyin: Jhonghua renmin gongheguo he su wei ai shehueijhuyi gongheguo lianmeng guanyu jhong su guo jie dong duan de sieding
Yue: Cantonese
- Yale Romanization: JungHwa RenMin GungHeGwo He Su Wei Ai SheHweiJuYi GungHeGwo LyanMeng GwanYu Jung Su Gwo Jye Dung Dwan De SyeDing

Mongolian name
- Mongolian Cyrillic: Хятад улс болон Хятад-ЗХУ-ын хилийн гэрээний зүүн хэсэгт Зөвлөлт Социалист Бүгд Найрамдах Холбоот Улс
Transcriptions
- SASM/GNC: Khyatad uls bolon Khyatad-ZKhU-yn khiliin gereenii züün khesegt Zövlölt Sotsialist Bügd Nairamdakh Kholboot Uls

Russian name
- Russian: Соглашение между Союзом Советских Социалистических Республик и Китайской Народной Республикой о советско-китайской государственной границе на её Восточной части

Kazakh name
- Kazakh: Қытай Халық Республикасы және Қытай- Кеңес шекара келісім шығыс учаскесінде Кеңестік Социалистік Республикалар Одағы

Kyrgyz name
- Kyrgyz: Кытай Эл Республикасынын жана Кытай - СССР чек ара макулдашуусу чыгыш бөлүгү боюнча ССРинин Республикалар Союзу

Tajik name
- Tajik: Созишнома байни Иттиҳоди Ҷумҳуриҳои Шӯравии Сотсиалистӣ ва Ҷумҳурии Мардумии Чин дар бораи сарҳади давлатӣ Сино шӯравӣ оид ба қисми шарқии он

The 1991 Sino–Soviet Border Agreement was a treaty signed between China and the Soviet Union. The treaty was witnessed by General Secretary of the Chinese Communist Party Jiang Zemin and General Secretary of the Communist Party of the Soviet Union Mikhail Gorbachev on May 16, 1991, during Jiang's official visit to the Soviet Union. It set up demarcation work to resolve most of the border disputes between the two states. Initially signed by China and the Soviet Union, the terms of the agreement were resumed by Russia after the dissolution of the Soviet Union. The treaty resulted in some minor territorial changes along the border.

== Background ==
The border between the Soviet Union and China had long been an issue of contention. The Sino-Soviet border was a legacy of various treaties between the Qing dynasty and the Russian Empire, the Treaty of Aigun and the Treaty of Beijing, in which Russia gained over 1 million km^{2} (390,000 sq mi) of territory in Manchuria at China's expense, and another 500,000 km^{2} in the western regions from several other treaties. These treaties have long been regarded by the Chinese as unequal treaties, and the issue partially arose again with the Sino-Soviet split, with tensions eventually leading to division-scale military clashes along the border in 1969.

Even as tensions lessened and leaders on both sides adopted more conciliatory attitudes, the border issue remained unresolved. Despite their view of the previous border treaties as unequal ones, Chinese leaders were willing to negotiate on the basis of the modern boundaries. That left about 35,000 km^{2} of territory in dispute, with about 28,000 km^{2} in the Pamir Mountains of Tajikistan, 6,000 km^{2} elsewhere along the western border, and about 1,000 km^{2} along the Argun, Amur, and Ussuri rivers on the eastern border. Border negotiations were eventually resumed in 1987 at General Secretary Mikhail Gorbachev's initiation. An agreement was reached on the eastern portion of the border on May 16, 1991, several months before the final dissolution of the USSR. Russia inherited most of the former Sino-Soviet border, and ratified the agreement in February 1992, while the other post-Soviet republics negotiated separate border agreements.

== Agreement ==
The agreement largely finalized the 4,200 km (2,600 mi) border between the Soviet Union and China, except for a few disputed areas. The agreement states the intentions of both parties in resolving and demarcating the disputed border peacefully, identifies the various points of contention, and identifies the border as running through the center of the main channel of any river, based on the thalweg principle. The location of the main channel and the possession of the various islands would be decided in the course of the demarcation work. Various other articles stipulate military, usage, and traffic rights along the river borders. Two areas, Heixiazi Island and Abagaitu Islet, were excluded from the agreement, and their status would not be resolved until 2004. According to the estimates by Boris Tkachenko, a Russian historian, the treaty resulted in net territorial gain for China, which received about 720 km^{2}, including some seven hundred islands.

Because islands on the Argun, Amur, and Ussuri rivers often split the rivers into multiple streams, the location of the main stream (and thus the border) was often not immediately apparent. Obviously, each country would receive a greater number of islands if the recognized main channel was closer to the opposite bank. Thus, the demarcation work was often controversial and subject to local protests over disputed territories. The demarcation work continued nearly up until its 1997 deadline.

== Disputed territories and their resolution ==
The border territories that were disputed (arranged clockwise):

=== Western border ===
After the breakup of the Soviet Union, the former Sino-Soviet border was now shared by Tajikistan, Kyrgyzstan, Kazakhstan, and Russia. While the majority of the disputed territories lay in the west, the Russian Federation inherited only about 50 km (31 mi) of the former western Sino-Soviet border. China negotiated separate border agreements with each of the post-Soviet republics on its western borders. (See e.g. the China–Kazakhstan border).

=== Argun River ===
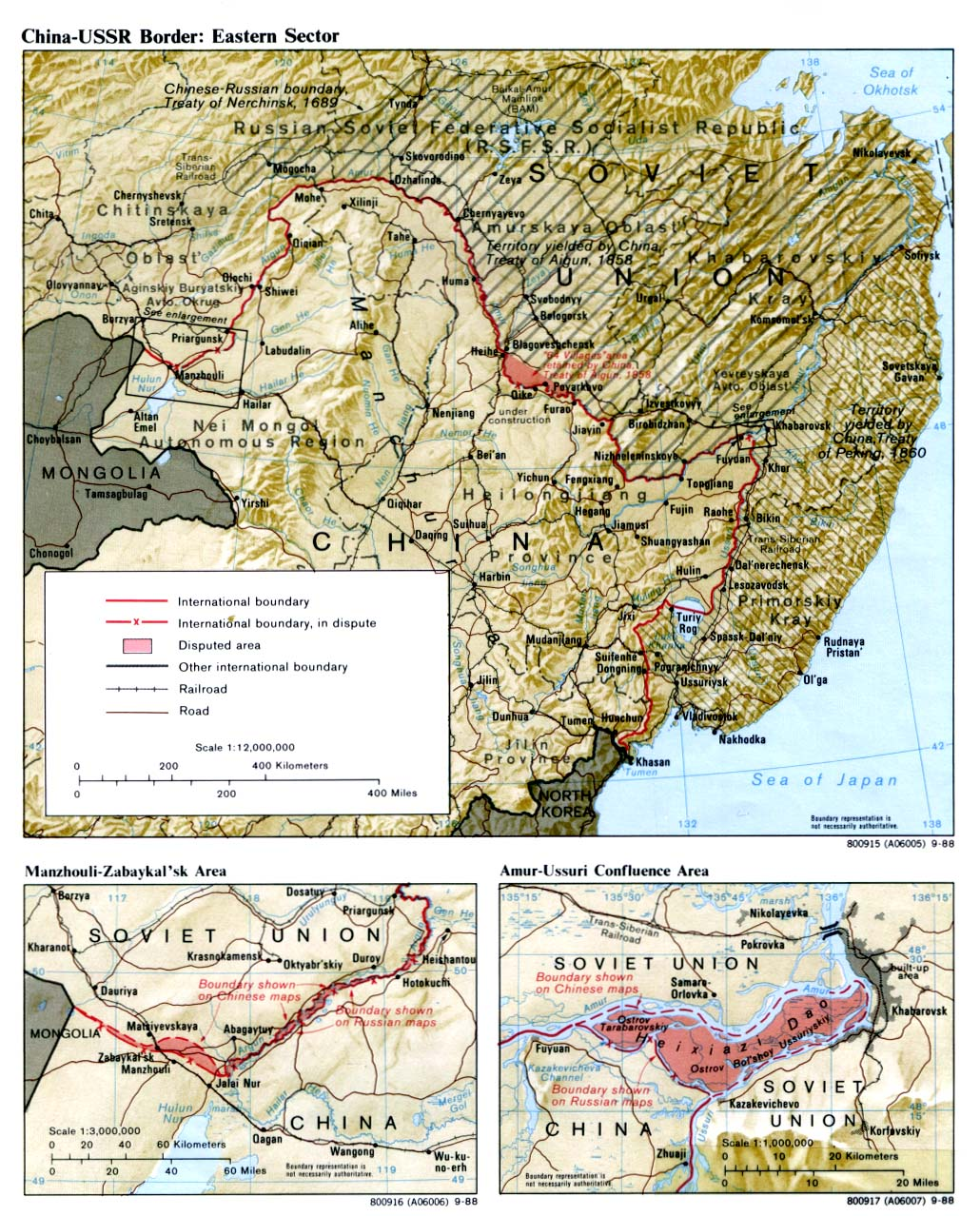
Some of the disputed areas in the Argun and Amur rivers

Menkeseli was a 17.5 km^{2} (6.8 sq mi) region along the Argun River that according to the agreement should have been transferred to China. However, this was opposed by local Russian civilians, who used this area for fishing. The dispute was finally finalized in 1996, in which the region would be transferred to China but local Russian residents would be guaranteed special usage rights to the region.

413 islands and islets along the river were disputed. The final apportionment has 204 islands in Soviet territory and 209 islands in Chinese territory.

Specifically excluded from the agreement was the status of 5 km^{2} (1.9 sq mi) Abagaitu Islet, on the border between China's Inner Mongolia and Russia's Chita Oblast and near the cities of Zabaykalsk and Manzhouli. In Chinese it is known by the Mongolian name of Abaigaitui, while the name in Russian is Bolshoy. This island would be transferred to China in subsequent agreements in 2004.

=== Amur River ===
The islands of the Amur river were subject to some border clashes between Soviet and Japanese forces during the Manchukuo period. After the invasion of Manchukuo during World War II, the Soviet Union unilaterally occupied many of the islands along the Amur River and prevented Chinese locals from entering. These islands were the site of several military skirmishes during the 1960s. Most of the disputed islands have been transferred to China. Of the 1,680 islands along the Amur, the agreement now recognizes 902 Chinese islands and 708 Russian islands.

The two islands of Bolshoy Ussuriysky Island (32 km^{2}) and Tarabarov island (4 km^{2}) near Khabarovsk, along the junction of the Amur and Ussuri rivers were specifically excluded from the agreement. The two islands are referred to collectively in Chinese as Heixiazi, although the smaller Tarabarov is sometimes called Yinlong. The status of these islands was resolved in 2004, when Tarabarov and approximately 50% of Bolshoy Ussuriysky were transferred to China.

In addition to the islands in the Amur River, the original Treaty of Aigun-Blagovaschensk retained the right of residency of over 15,000 subjects of the Qing Empire in the 64 villages north and east of the Amur River. These treaty conditions were subsequently reneged and the Manchu, Han, and Daur residents were deported, or massacred in pogroms Sixty-Four Villages East of the River

The PRC relinquished claims to these lands during border negotiations.

=== Ussuri River ===
Of almost 150 island groups on the Ussuri river, almost forty lay disputed. Many of these islands were the site of numerous skirmishes and clashes before and during the Sino-Soviet border conflict. Of the 320 islands along this river, the agreement recognizes 167 Russian islands and 153 Chinese islands.

Kutsuzov is the largest island along the Ussuri. Under former Chinese possession it was known as Daxitong dao. Control was transferred to the Soviet Union during the Manchukuo period. Under the terms of the agreement, the island remained in Russia's possession.

Damansky, or Zhenbao Island along the Ussuri River, was the site of the 1969 Damansky Island incident. After the conflict, the Chinese appear to have retained de facto control over the island. The agreement recognized China's de jure as well as de facto control.

=== Lake Khanka ===
Around 3 km^{2} (1.2 sq mi) of territory at Lake Khanka near the village of Tury Rog was transferred to Chinese control.

West of Lake Khanka lay a section of territory unilaterally seized from Manchukuo by the Soviet Union in 1933. This territory, about 0.70 to 0.90 square kilometres (170 to 220 acres), has been transferred to Chinese control.

=== Suifen River ===
A delta forms at the junction of the Suifen and Granitnaya Rivers, which is also the location of the border. In 1903, the Russian Empire acquired control of the delta. The delta was later given to Manchukuo, which was then restored to China, but the Soviet Union retained control of the islands along the river. These islands have been transferred to China.

=== Granitnaya River ===
This dispute involves a section of the former land border near the Granitnaya River, which borders part of Heilongjiang Province and Ussuriysky District (now Ussuriysk urban district) of Primorsky Krai. The original Convention of Peking (Beijing) states this section of the border lies along the Granitnaya, but the origin of the river de facto lay inside Russian territory. With the 1991 agreement, Russia transferred 9 km^{2} (3.5 sq mi) to China so that now the Sino-Russian border runs along the entire length of the river.

=== Tumen River ===
The Khasansky District lies near the Sino-North Korean border and the Sino-Russian border and included two disputed regions along the Tumen River. According to the agreement, 3 km^{2} (1.2 sq mi) of territory would be transferred to China, and Chinese ships would gain the right to navigate the Tumen river. The territory transfer would connect a previously enclaved piece of Chinese territory to the rest of China (Fangchuancun). This portion of the agreement stirred up some controversy among some Russian officials from Primorsky Krai, as they felt that direct Chinese access to the Sea of Japan (through the Tumen River) would decrease the economic importance of Vladivostok and Nakhodka. Other arguments protested at potential pollution from Chinese economic development, the possibility of Chinese military vessels navigating the river, and the presence of a Russian cemetery commemorating the Lake Khasan Incident in the area. Finally, in June 1997, the Russian side proposed a resolution which would divide the disputed territory in half. This was accepted by China in September of the same year, and in November, when the border demarcation work was declared finished, 1.6 km^{2} (0.62 sq mi) were transferred to China, and 1.4 km^{2} (0.54 sq mi) were retained by Russia. The Lake Khasan cemetery remained on the Russian side, and the Chinese officials underwent informal agreements to not build a port along the Tumen River.

=== Sino-Russian-North Korean border ===
The exact location of the Sino-Russian border along the left bank of the Tumen River was an area of contention (the entirety of the right bank of the river belonging to North Korea). The Convention of Peking (Beijing) set the location of border at 24 km (15 mi) above the mouth of the river, where it enters the Sea of Japan, but through Chinese negotiation was later moved to about 15 or 16 km (9.9 mi) above the mouth. In 1964, both sides agreed to a border about 17 km (11 mi) above the mouth, and these terms were kept in the 1991 agreement. However, the Russian side preferred it to be set at 24 km, and the Chinese at 15 km. The final position was set at 18.3 km (11.4 mi) above the mouth of the river.

The final position of the triangular border, where China, Russia, and North Korea meet, was successfully demarcated in 1998 after trilateral negotiations from all three countries, and went into effect in 1999.

== Relation to Taiwan's mainland claim ==
The Republic of China now based in Taiwan does not recognize any Chinese territorial changes based on any border agreements signed by the People's Republic of China with any other countries, including this 1991 one, due to the requirements in the Constitution of the Republic of China and its Additional Articles. Russia does not recognize the legitimacy of the Republic of China, though the two countries maintain unofficial relations, with representative offices of each country in the other's capital.

== See also ==
- Sino-Soviet border conflict
- Foreign relations of China
- Foreign relations of the Soviet Union
- 2001 Sino-Russian Treaty of Friendship
- Bear Island (Amur River)

== Bibliography ==
- Iwashita Akihiro (2004). "An Inquiry for New Thinking on the Border Dispute: Backgrounds of "Historic Success" for the Sino-Russian Negotiations". Slavic Eurasian Studies. 6: 95–114. Archived from the original on 17 December 2005.
- Yutaka Akino (1997) [1996]. "Moscow's New Perspectives on Sino-Russian Relations". In Tadayuki Hayashi (ed.). The Emerging New Regional Order in Central and Eastern Europe. Slavic Research Centre.
- Steven Parham (November 2004). "Narrating the Border: The Discourse of Control over China's Northwest Frontier" (PDF). Arbeitsblatt. 25. ISBN 3-906465-25-X. Archived from the original (PDF) on 10 December 2005.
