= Yinlong Island =

Island in China

Coordinates: 48°22′44″N 134°31′13″E

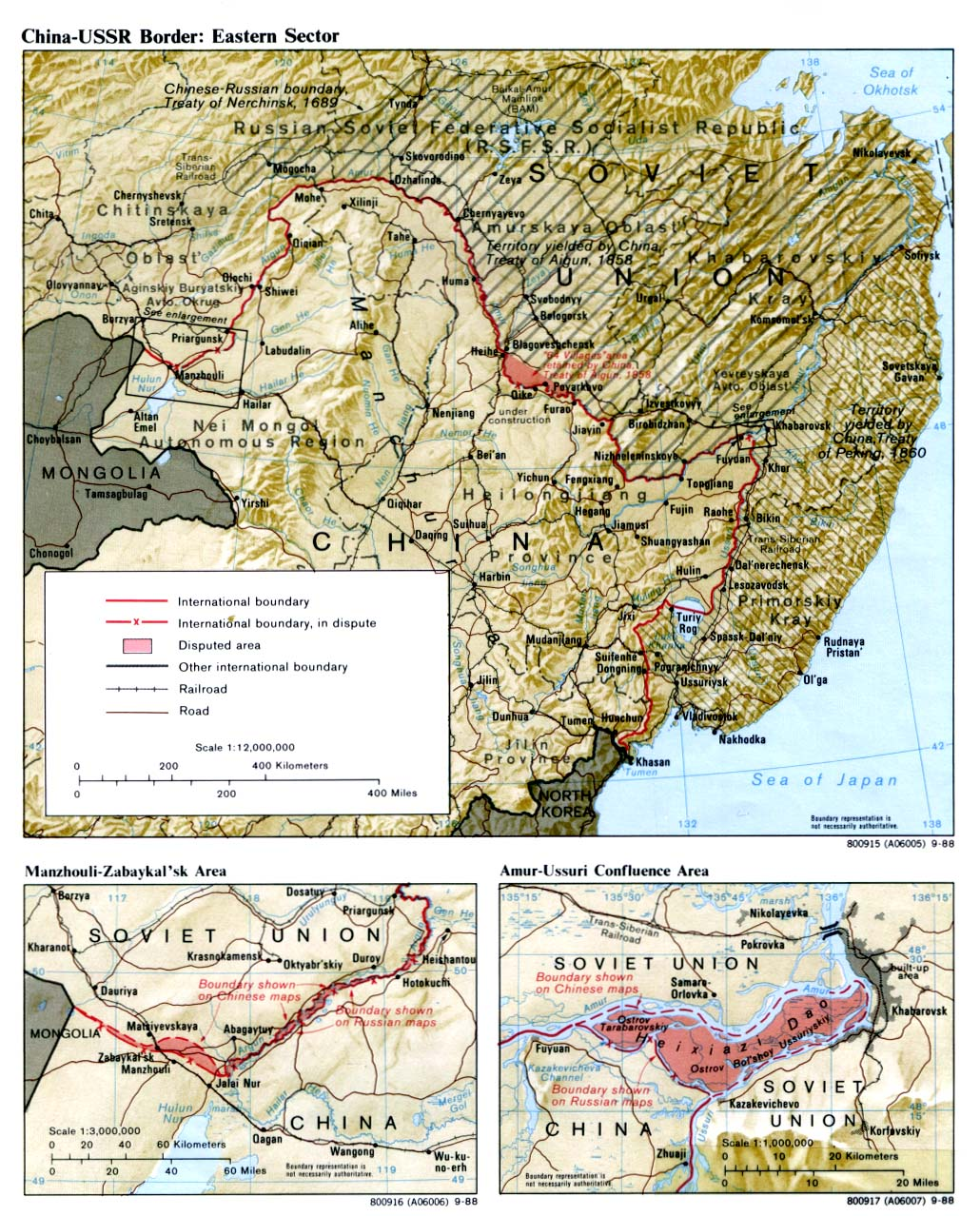
Yinlong Island is depicted in the inset map along with the larger Bolshoy Ussuriysky Island.

Yinlong Island (Chinese: 银龙岛; pinyin: Yínlóng Dǎo; Russian: Остров Тарабаров, romanized: Ostrov Tarabarov) is a sedimentary island at the confluence of the Ussuri and Amur rivers in China. The island has an area of between 50 and 100 km^{2}. It is bounded closely by Bolshoy Ussuriysky Island.

Until 2008, Yinlong Island and its neighbouring islands were the site of a territorial dispute between China and Russia. Russia occupied the islands in 1929. However this was never accepted by China. While Russia governed the islands as a part of Khabarovsk Krai, China claimed them as a part of Fuyuan County, Heilongjiang province.

The dispute over Yinlong Island and its neighbouring islands was finally resolved on July 21, 2008. On that day the Foreign Ministers of the two countries signed an agreement in Beijing. Under the agreement, Russia ceded approximately 174 km^{2} of territory to China. This comprised all of Yinlong Island and approximately half of the larger Bolshoy Ussuriysky Island. At the time of the territory transfer, Yinlong Island was largely uninhabited. The settlement of their border dispute followed over 40 years of negotiations. The final settlement was the result of the Treaty of Good-Neighborliness and Friendly Cooperation which was concluded on June 2, 2005.

Yinlong Island and the surrounding islands are the most eastern part of China and are the first place on mainland China to see sunlight.
