= Fuyuan, Heilongjiang =

Fuyuan 抚远市
- County-level city
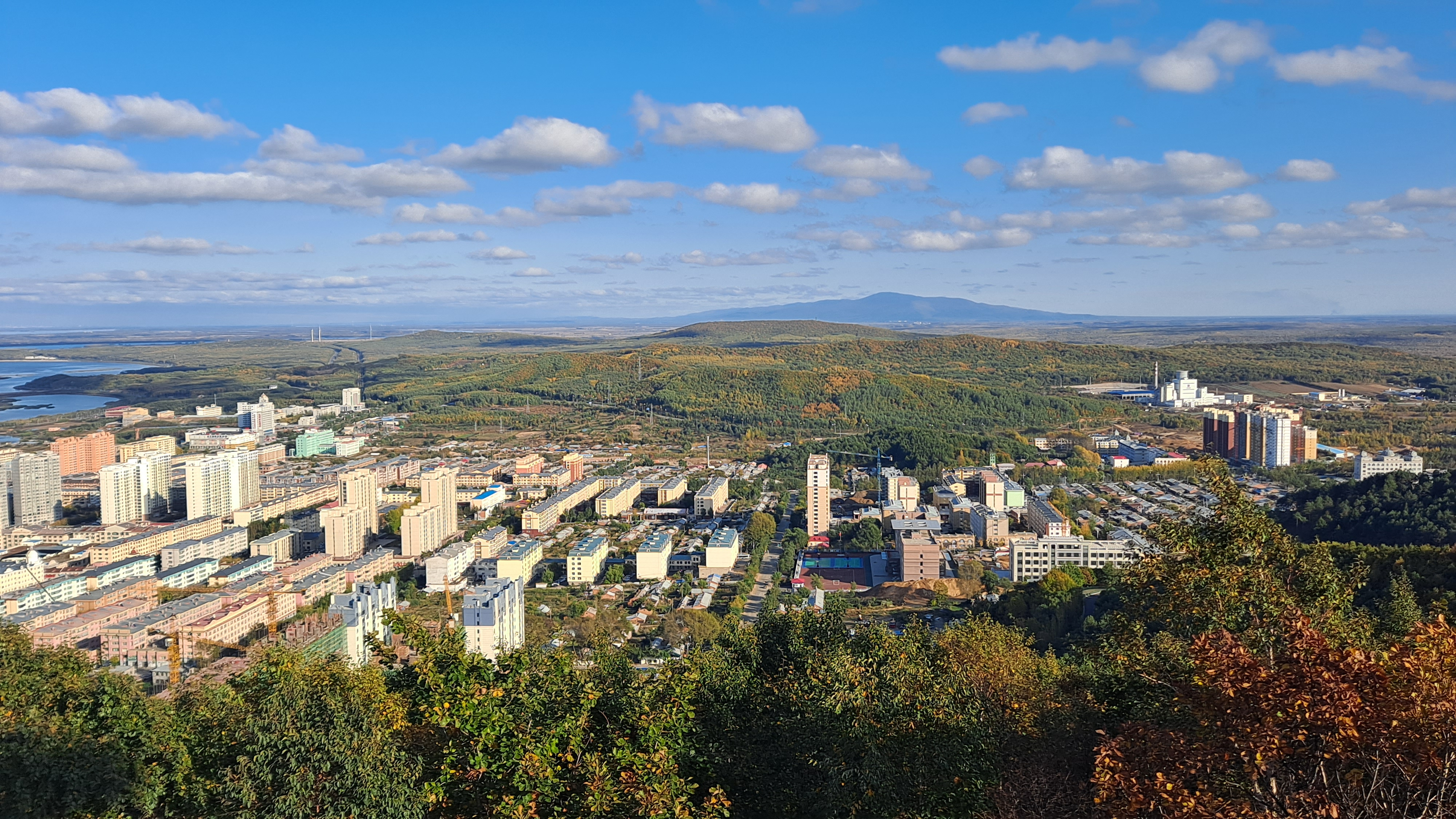
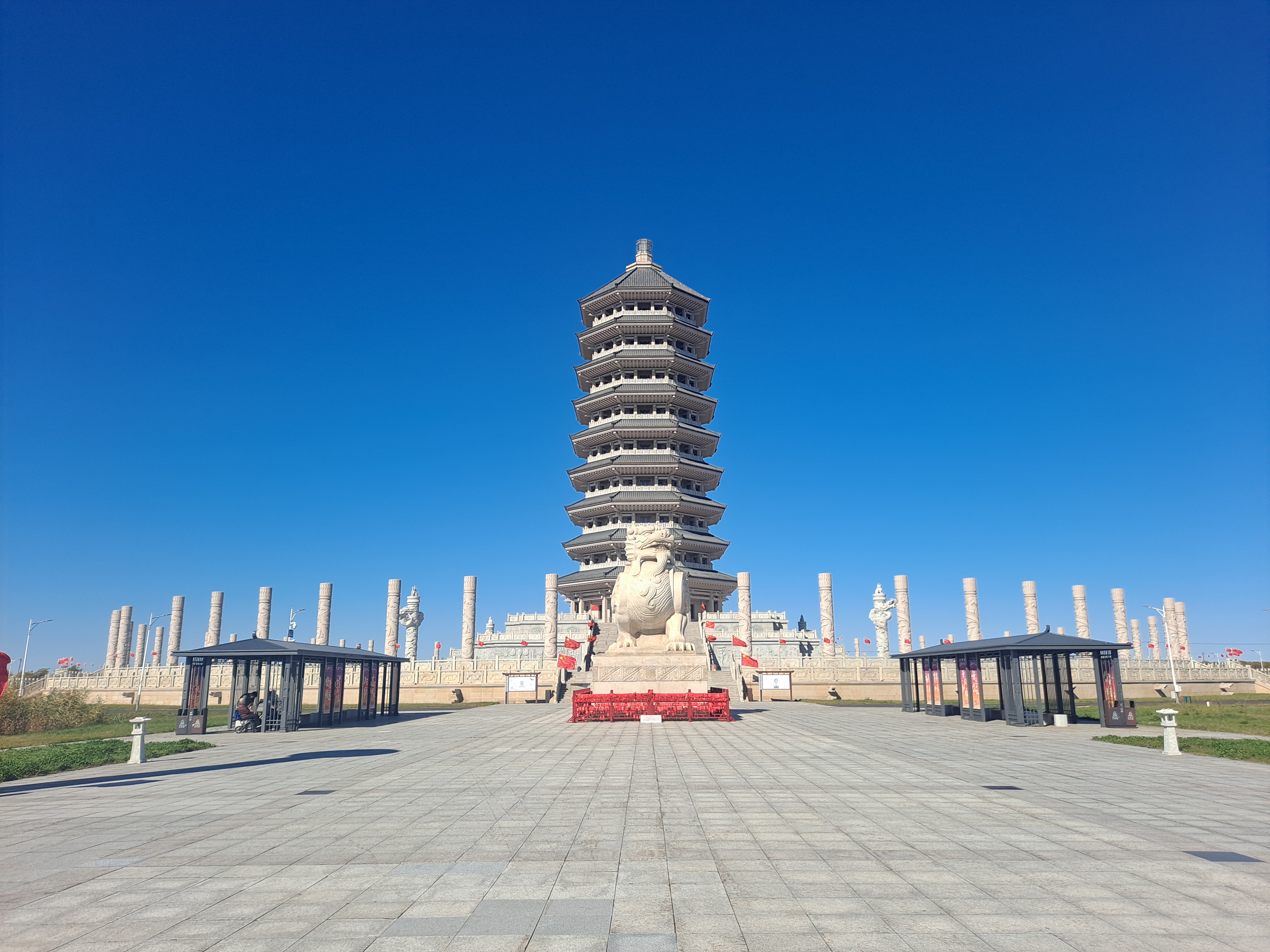
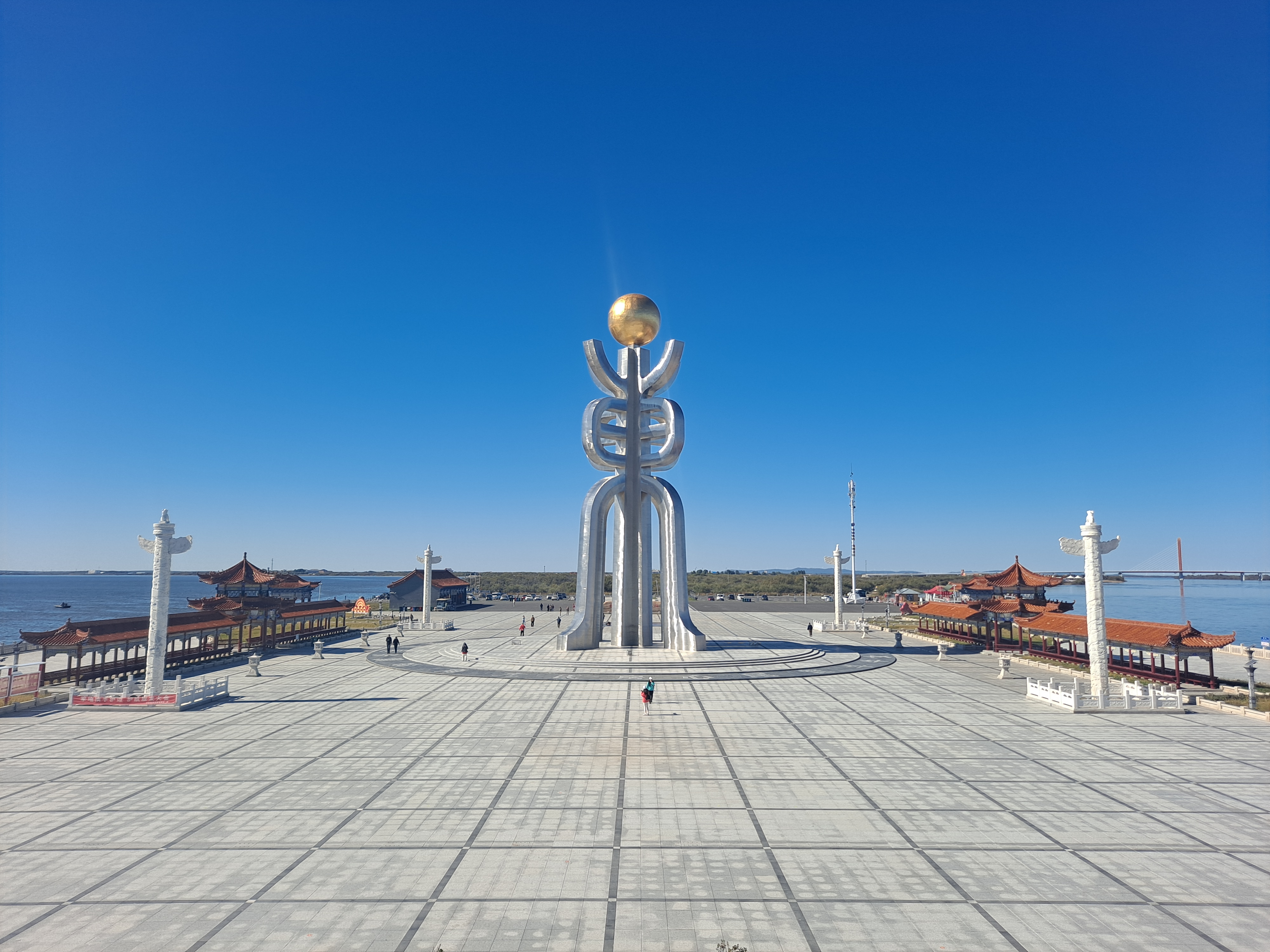
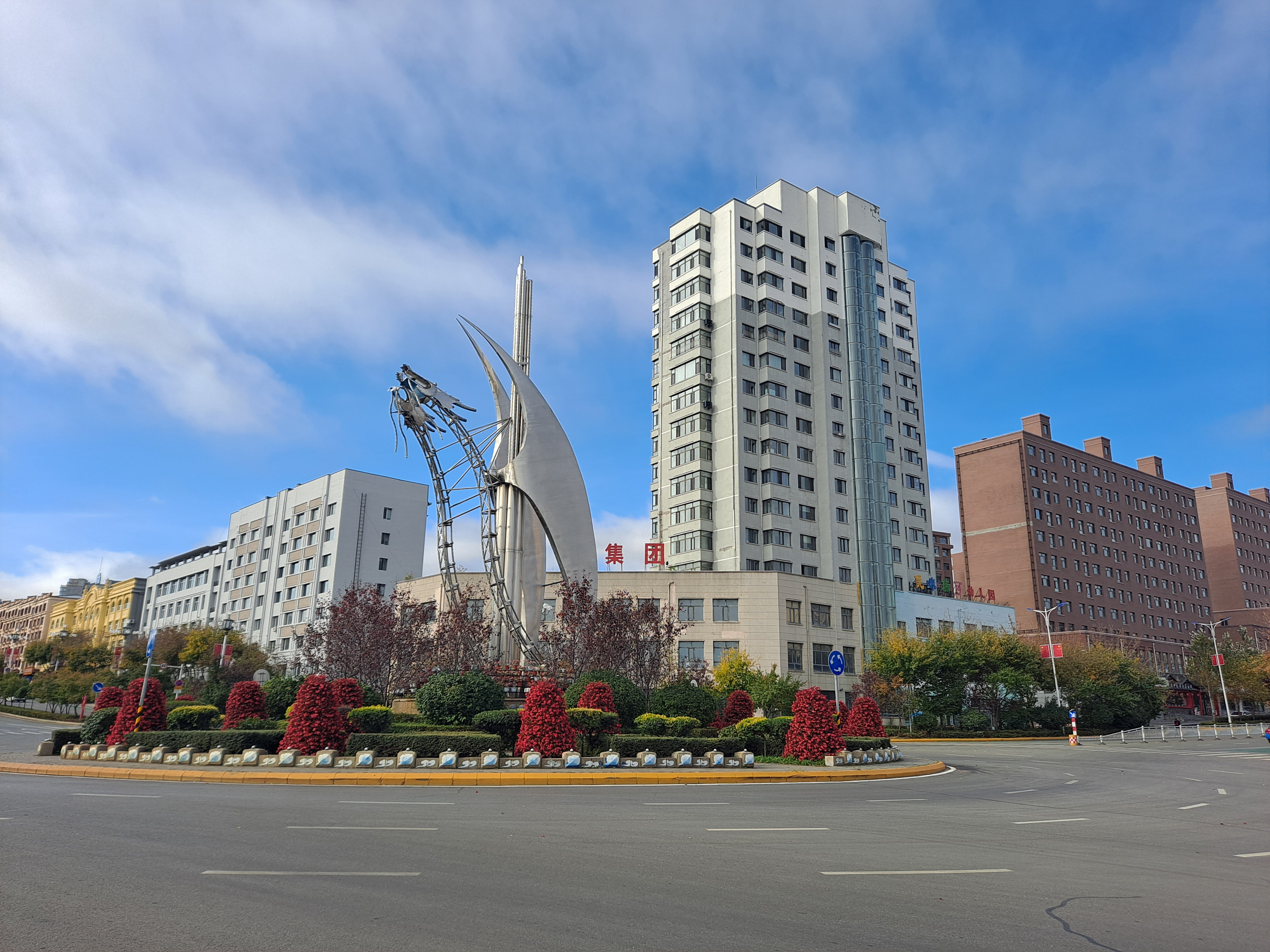
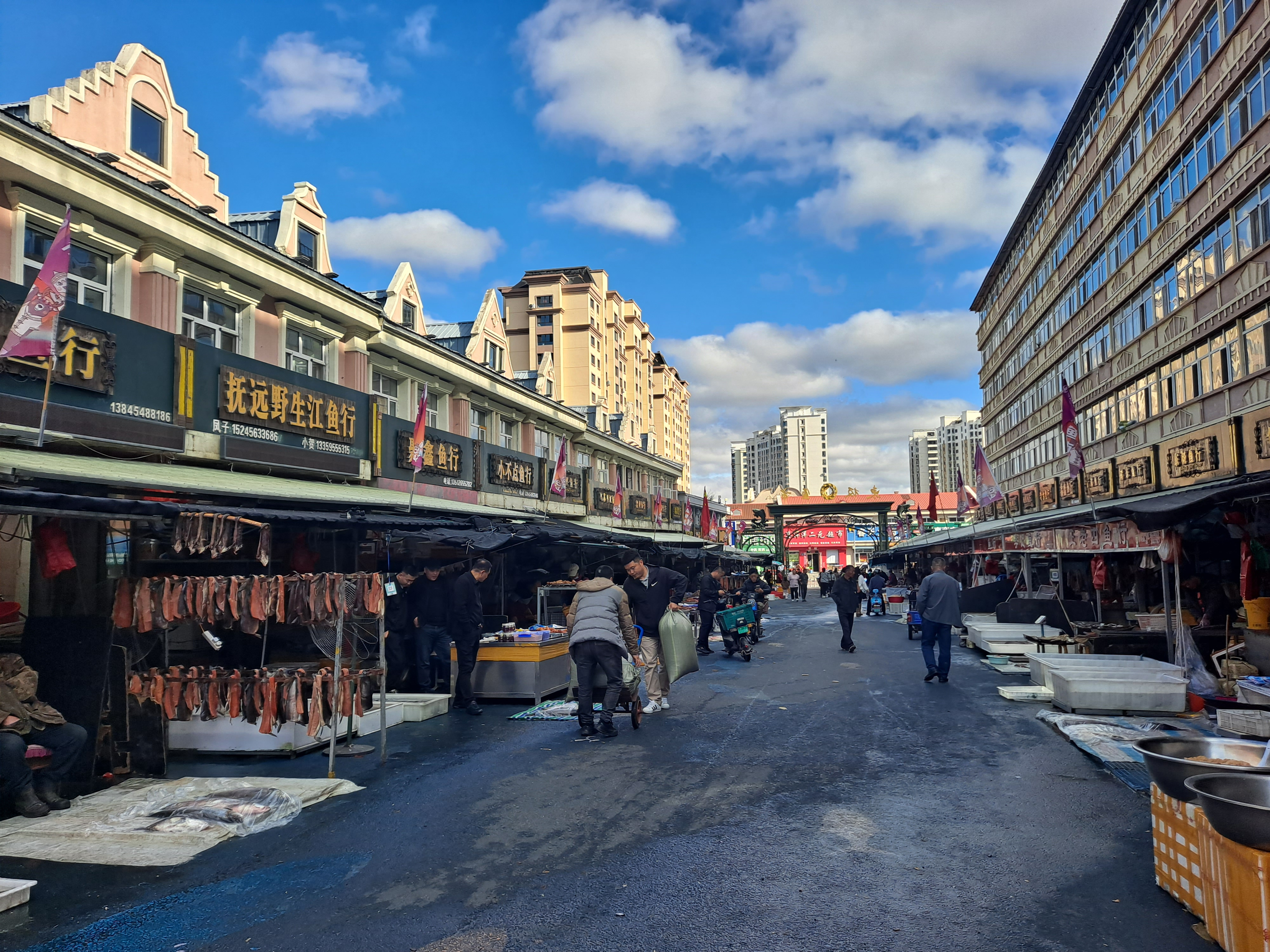
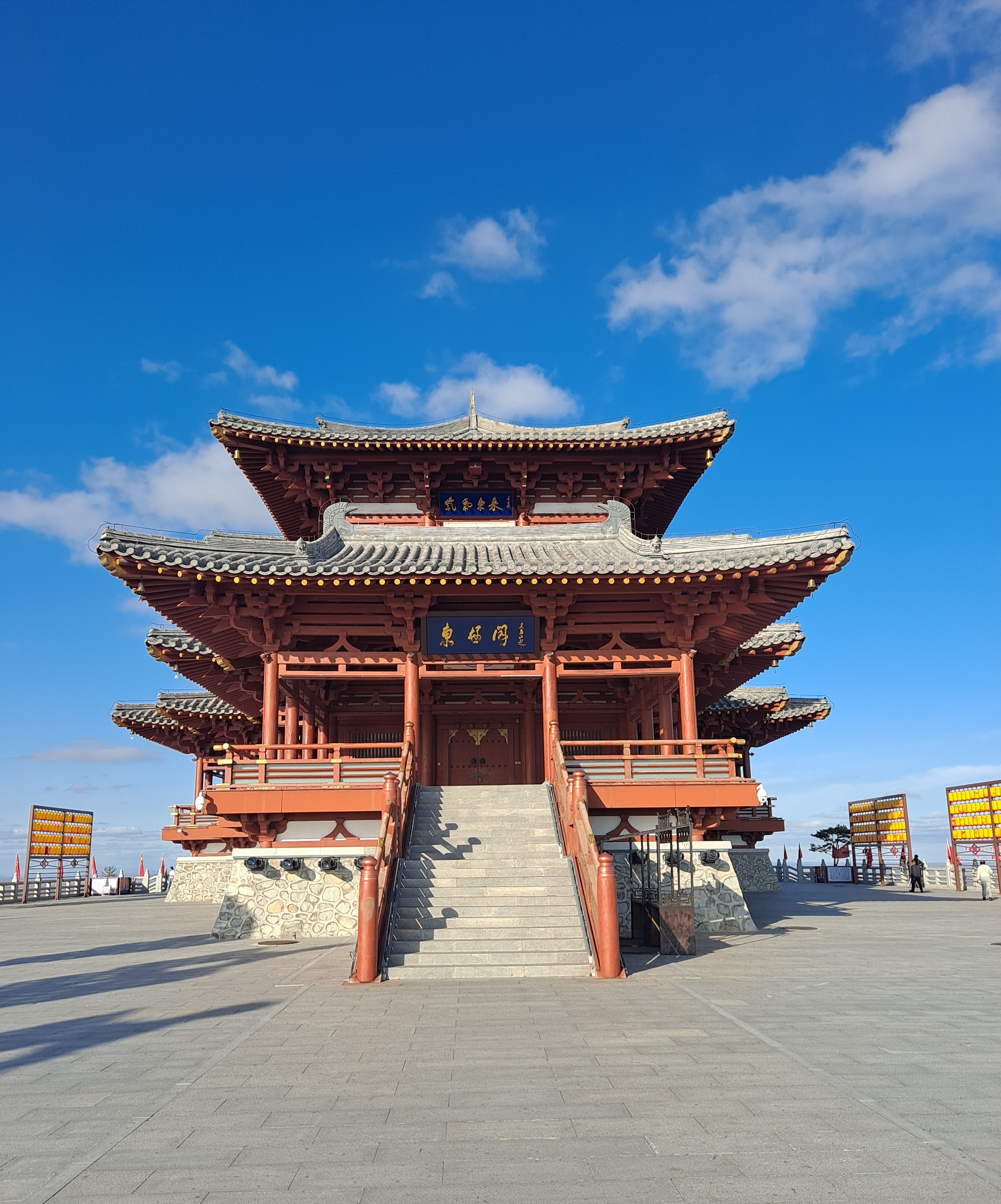
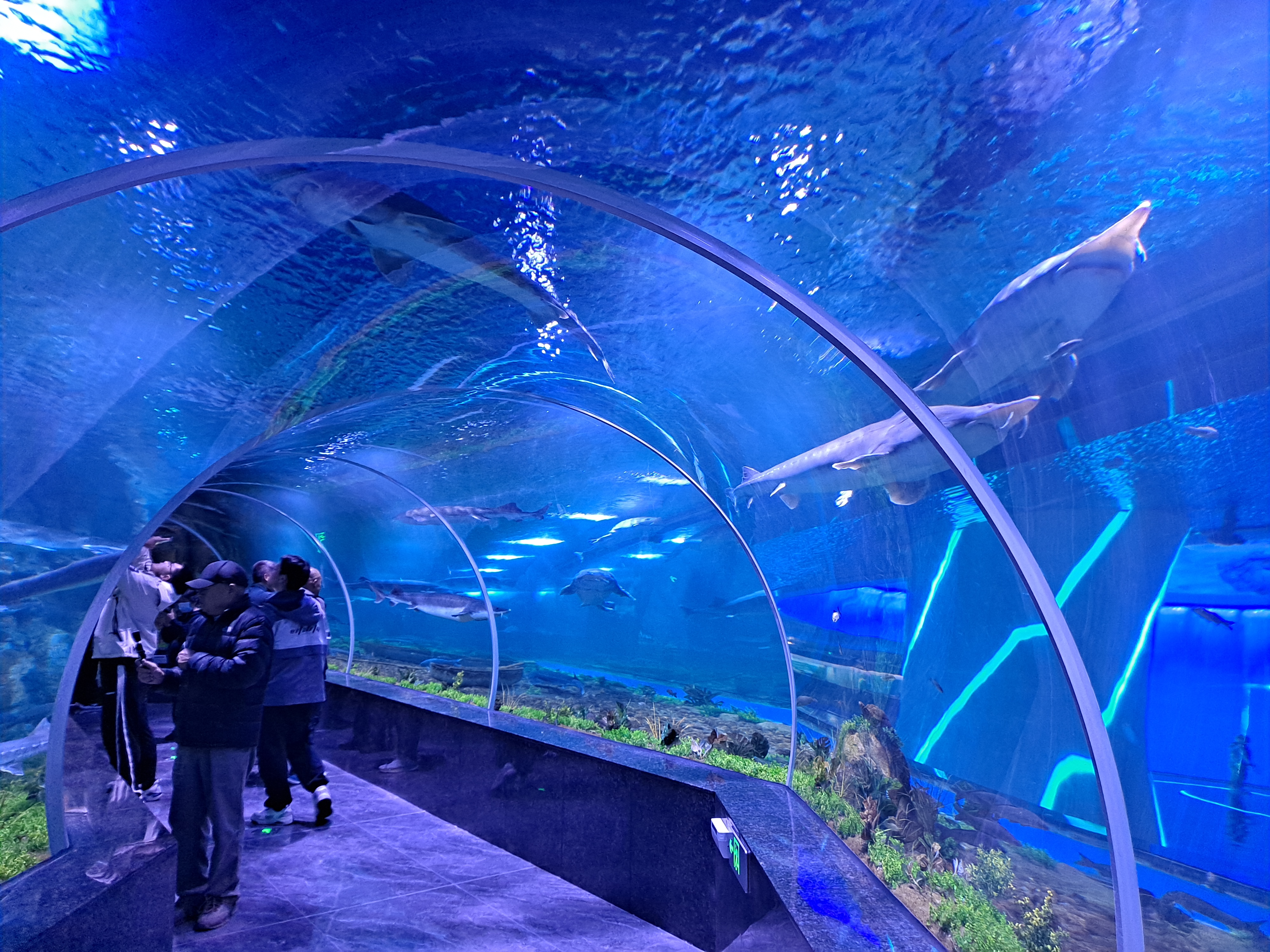
- 抚远市天际线 东极宝塔 东极广场 抚远街景 东极鱼市 东极阁 三江自然生态馆

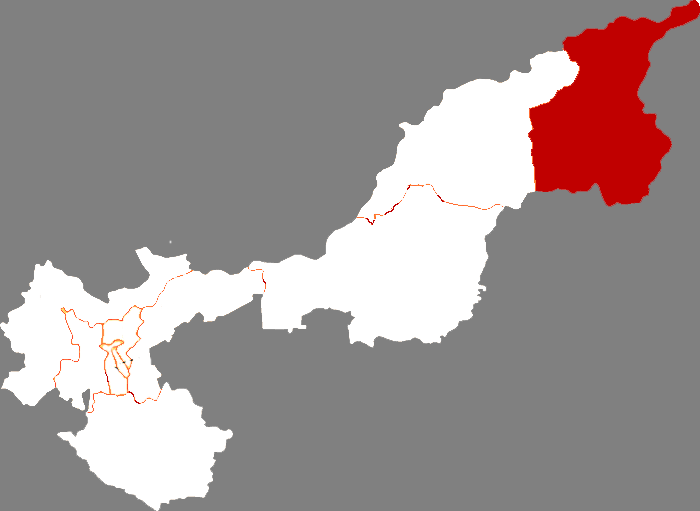
- Fuyuan in Jiamusi

- Location in Heilongjiang Fuyuan (China)
- Coordinates: 48°21′53″N 134°18′28″E
- Country: People's Republic of China
- Province: Heilongjiang
- Prefecture-level city: Jiamusi

Area
  - Total: 6,260 km^{2} (2,420 sq mi)

Population (2010)
  - Total: 126,694
  - Density: 20.2/km^{2} (52.4/sq mi)
- Time zone: UTC+8 (China Standard)
- Division code: FYF

Fuyuan (simplified Chinese: 抚远市; traditional Chinese: 撫遠市; pinyin: Fǔyuǎn Shì; Russian: Фуюань) is a county-level city of the province of Heilongjiang, China. It is under the jurisdiction of the prefecture-level city of Jiamusi.

== History ==
The area of present-day Fuyuan was inhabited by the Sushen dating back to approximately 4000 BCE. By the early 11th century BCE, local Sushen people began paying tribute to a dynasty hailing from the Central Plains.

In 1909, the area was incorporated into the newly established Suiyuan Prefecture. In 1913, Suiyuan Prefecture was changed to a county. In 1929, Suiyuan County was renamed to Fuyuan County.

The area was brought under control of the Japanese puppet state of Manchukuo in 1934, which placed the area under the administration of Sanjiang Province.

The People's Liberation Army took control the area in 1945. In June 1947, they abolished Sanjiang Province, and merged it into the newly created Hejiang Province.

In April 1951, Fuyuan County was abolished, and replaced with the Fuyuan Fishing Special District, and part of its area was transferred to adjacent Raohe County. Fuyuan Fishing Special District was reverted to a county in August 1952. Part of nearby Fujin County was transferred to Fuyuan County in March 1959, and Fuyuan County's seat of government was moved to the town of Tongjiang. In 1966, Tongjiang County was split off of Fuyuan County. On October 14, 2008, a border dispute with neighboring Russia over Bolshoy Ussuriysky Island (known as Heixiazi Island in Chinese), was resolved, giving Fuyuan County part of the island. In 2011, Fuyuan County was placed under direct administration of the Heilongjiang provincial government, giving it de facto prefecture-level status. On January 15, 2016, Fuyuan County was abolished, and Fuyuan became a county-level city under the jurisdiction of Jiamusi.

== Geography ==
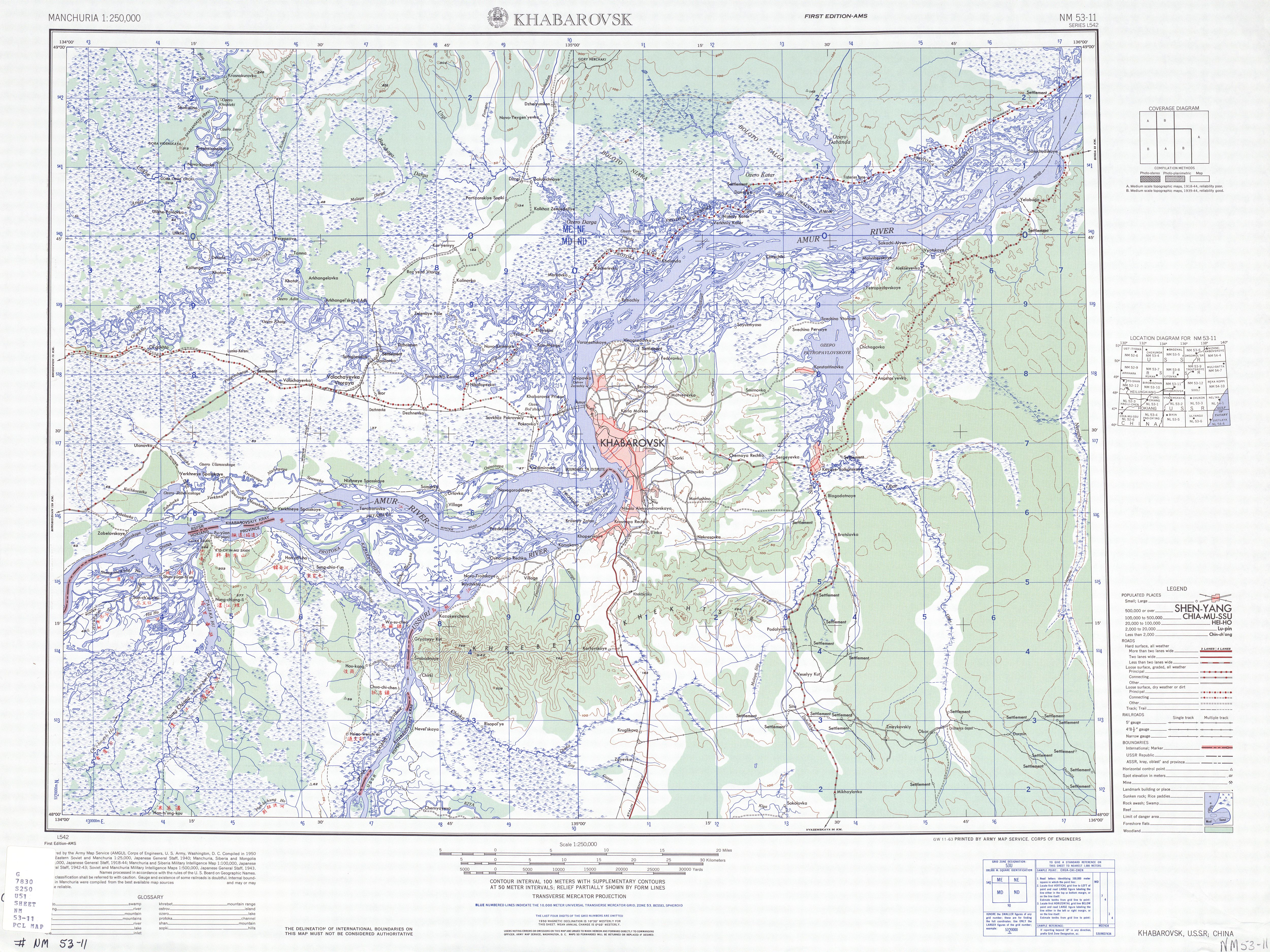
Khabarovsk (1950)

Fuyuan is located in the lowlands at the confluence of the Heilongjiang (Amur) River and Wusuli (Ussuri) Rivers. The city seat, Fuyuan Town, sits on the southern bank of the Amur. On the opposite side of the river is Russia's Jewish Autonomous Region.

Fuyuan is China's easternmost county-level division. Its northern and eastern borders, running along the Heilongjiang (Amur) and Wusuli (Ussuri) Rivers, are also parts of China's international border with Russia. The Bolshoy Ussuriysky Island (Heixiazi Island), partitioned between the two countries by the treaty of 2004, is in the city's northeastern corner, the mid-island border line running about 25 km (16 mi) east of Fuyuan Town. Khabarovsk is about 50 km (31 mi) east of Fuyuan Town 65 km (40 mi), by river.

The city is a major grain producer.

=== Climate ===
Fuyuan has a humid continental climate (Köppen: Dwa) bordering on Dwb, with long, cold winters, but also dry, although less extreme than more inland locations of Heilongjiang.

Climate data for Fuyuan, elevation 41 m (135 ft), (1991–2020 normals, extremes 1981–present)
Month	Jan	Feb	Mar	Apr	May	Jun	Jul	Aug	Sep	Oct	Nov	Dec	Year
Record high °C (°F)	−0.7 (30.7)	4.5 (40.1)	16.6 (61.9)	26.1 (79.0)	31.8 (89.2)	33.5 (92.3)	36.6 (97.9)	35.5 (95.9)	29.3 (84.7)	24.9 (76.8)	13.3 (55.9)	1.2 (34.2)	36.6 (97.9)
Mean daily maximum °C (°F)	−15.2 (4.6)	−10.1 (13.8)	−1.3 (29.7)	9.8 (49.6)	18.6 (65.5)	23.8 (74.8)	26.5 (79.7)	24.9 (76.8)	19.4 (66.9)	10.1 (50.2)	−3.1 (26.4)	−13.7 (7.3)	7.5 (45.4)
Daily mean °C (°F)	−19.2 (−2.6)	−14.7 (5.5)	−5.7 (21.7)	5.1 (41.2)	13.5 (56.3)	19.2 (66.6)	22.3 (72.1)	21.0 (69.8)	15.0 (59.0)	5.8 (42.4)	−6.7 (19.9)	−17.2 (1.0)	3.2 (37.7)
Mean daily minimum °C (°F)	−23.3 (−9.9)	−19.8 (−3.6)	−10.8 (12.6)	0.6 (33.1)	8.7 (47.7)	14.8 (58.6)	18.5 (65.3)	17.4 (63.3)	11.0 (51.8)	1.9 (35.4)	−10.0 (14.0)	−20.6 (−5.1)	−1.0 (30.3)
Record low °C (°F)	−42.4 (−44.3)	−33.9 (−29.0)	−29.0 (−20.2)	−11.5 (11.3)	−1.6 (29.1)	5.4 (41.7)	9.6 (49.3)	9.8 (49.6)	−1.0 (30.2)	−11.6 (11.1)	−27.5 (−17.5)	−42.3 (−44.1)	−42.4 (−44.3)
Average precipitation mm (inches)	9.0 (0.35)	8.2 (0.32)	19.3 (0.76)	32.3 (1.27)	64.8 (2.55)	72.2 (2.84)	131.5 (5.18)	131.7 (5.19)	78.3 (3.08)	38.2 (1.50)	19.6 (0.77)	12.1 (0.48)	617.2 (24.29)
Average precipitation days (≥ 0.1 mm)	7.6	5.9	6.6	9.4	12.4	12.9	13.0	13.6	11.4	8.9	8.1	8.8	118.6
Average snowy days	10.8	7.8	9.3	6.3	0.2	0	0	0	0.1	2.8	10.1	11.4	58.8
Average relative humidity (%)	70	65	60	58	62	71	76	78	71	61	65	70	67
Mean monthly sunshine hours	156.1	187.9	232.8	206.2	223.7	219.8	212.7	203.5	201.3	172.2	144.2	137.3	2,297.7
Percentage possible sunshine	57	65	63	50	47	46	44	46	54	52	53	53	53
Source: China Meteorological Administration all-time extreme temperature

== Administrative divisions ==
Fuyuan is divided into seven towns, three townships, and three other township-level divisions.

The city's seven towns are Fuyuan (抚远镇), Hanconggou (寒葱沟镇), Nongqiao (浓桥镇), Wusu (乌苏镇), Heixiazidao (黑瞎子岛镇), Tongjiang (通江镇), and Haiqing (海青乡).

The city's three townships are Nongjiang Township (浓江乡), Bielahong Township (别拉洪乡), and Yanan Township (鸭南乡).

The city also administers three other township-level divisions: Qianshao Farm (前哨农场), Qianfeng Farm (前锋农场), and Erdaohe Farm (二道河农场).

== Demographics ==
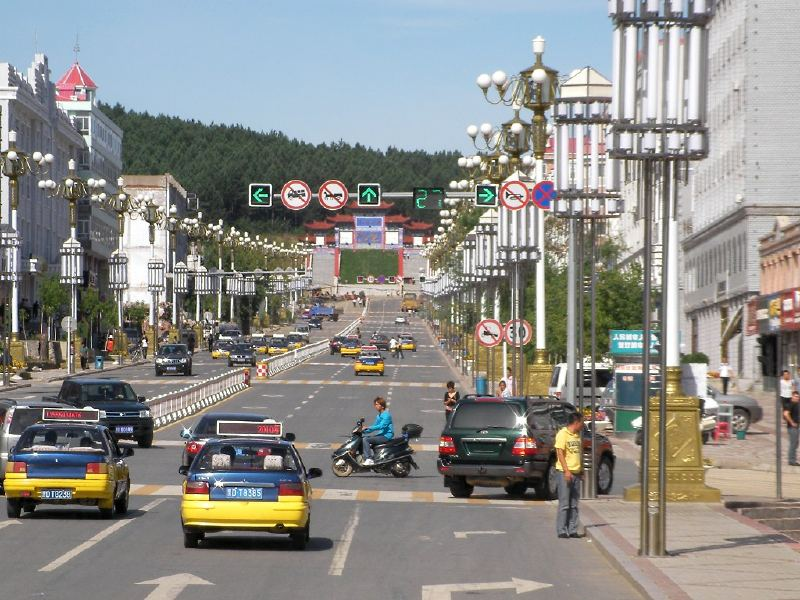
Zhengyang Street, the main street of Fuyuan city center

The population of the city was 110,000 in 2010.

== Economy ==
Fuyuan hosts a sizable agricultural industry, with major crops grown in the city including rice, soybeans, cranberries, and maize. The predominant type of livestock in the Fuyuan is geese. Aquaculture is also a major part of the city's economy, with sturgeon from Fuyuan being used in caviar.

Tourism, including eco-tourism is also a major component of the city's economy. The city has numerous eco-tourism sites located along the Amur River.

== Transportation ==
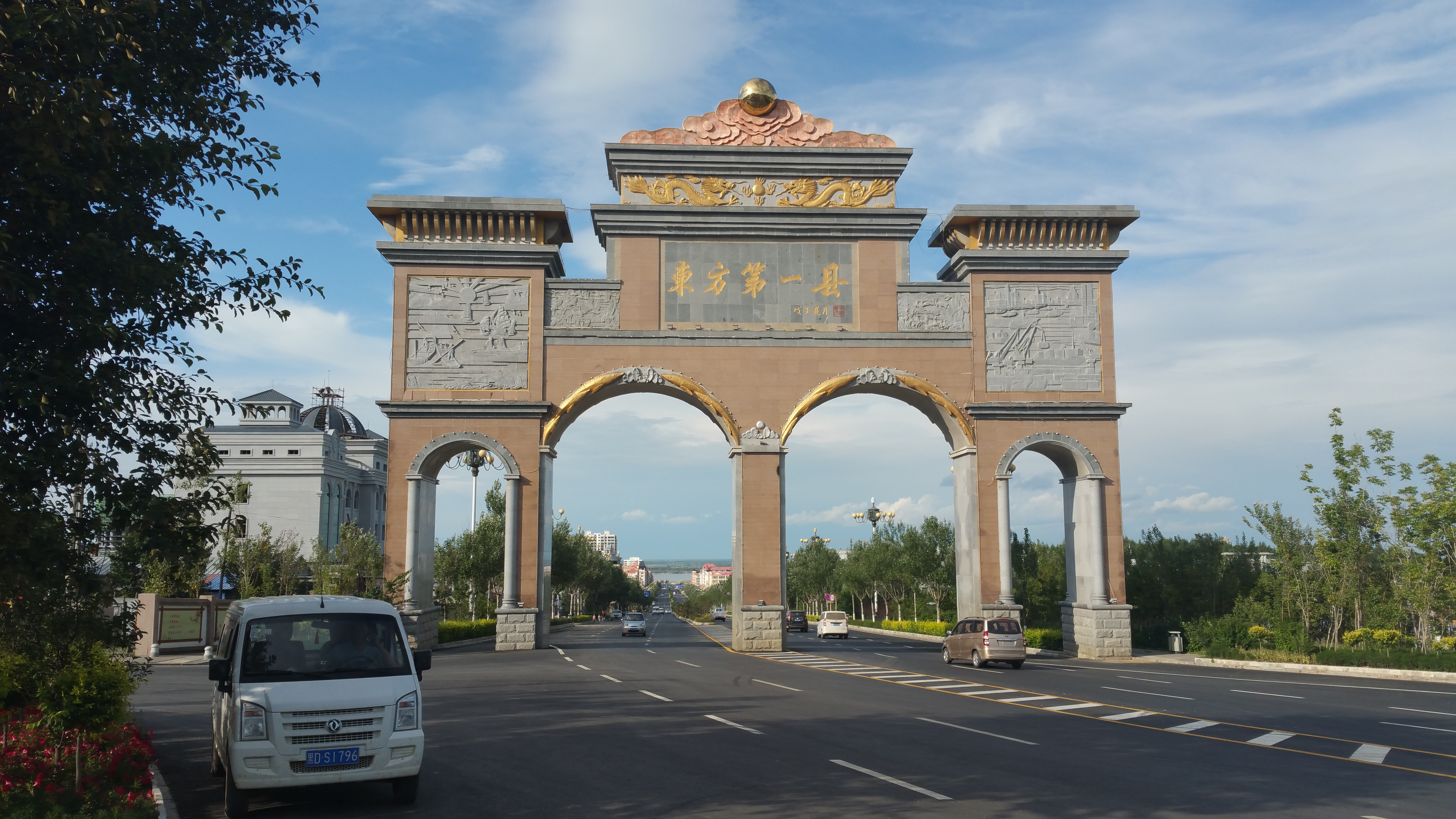
"First county of the east" paifang in Fuyuan

There is a railway station in Fuyuan, the railway having reached the city center only in 2011. As of late 2013, schedule systems list one passenger train a day serving Fuyuan; it comes from Harbin via Jiamusi, covering 973 km (605 mi) in 17.5 hours.

Fuyuan has port facilities on the Amur River as well.

Fuyuan Dongji Airport opened in 2014.

== Sport ==
Fuyuan is one of the cities in which the China Bandy Federation is exploring the potential for bandy development.

== See also ==
- List of extreme points of China
