= Granitnaya =

- Native name: 瑚布图河 (Chinese); Гранитная (Russian)

Location
- Country: Russia, China
- Region: Primorsky Krai, Heilongjiang

Physical characteristics
- Source
  - location: Khasansky District
- Mouth: Razdolnaya
  - location: Sanchakou
  - coordinates: 44°2′30″N 131°17′20″E
- Length: 99 km (62 mi)

Basin features
- Progression: Razdolnaya→ Sea of Japan

The Granitnaya (Russian: Гранитная, formerly Ушагоу Ushagou, simplified Chinese: 瑚布图河; traditional Chinese: 瑚布圖河; pinyin: Húbùtú Hé, literally "Hubutu River"), is a river located on the border between Primorsky Krai of Far Eastern Russia and the Heilongjiang province of China (northeast). It is a right tributary of the Razdolnaya. It is 99 kilometres (62 mi) long.
