= Zhenbao Island =

Island in the Ussuri River on the Russia–China border

Coordinates: 46°29′08″N 133°50′40″E

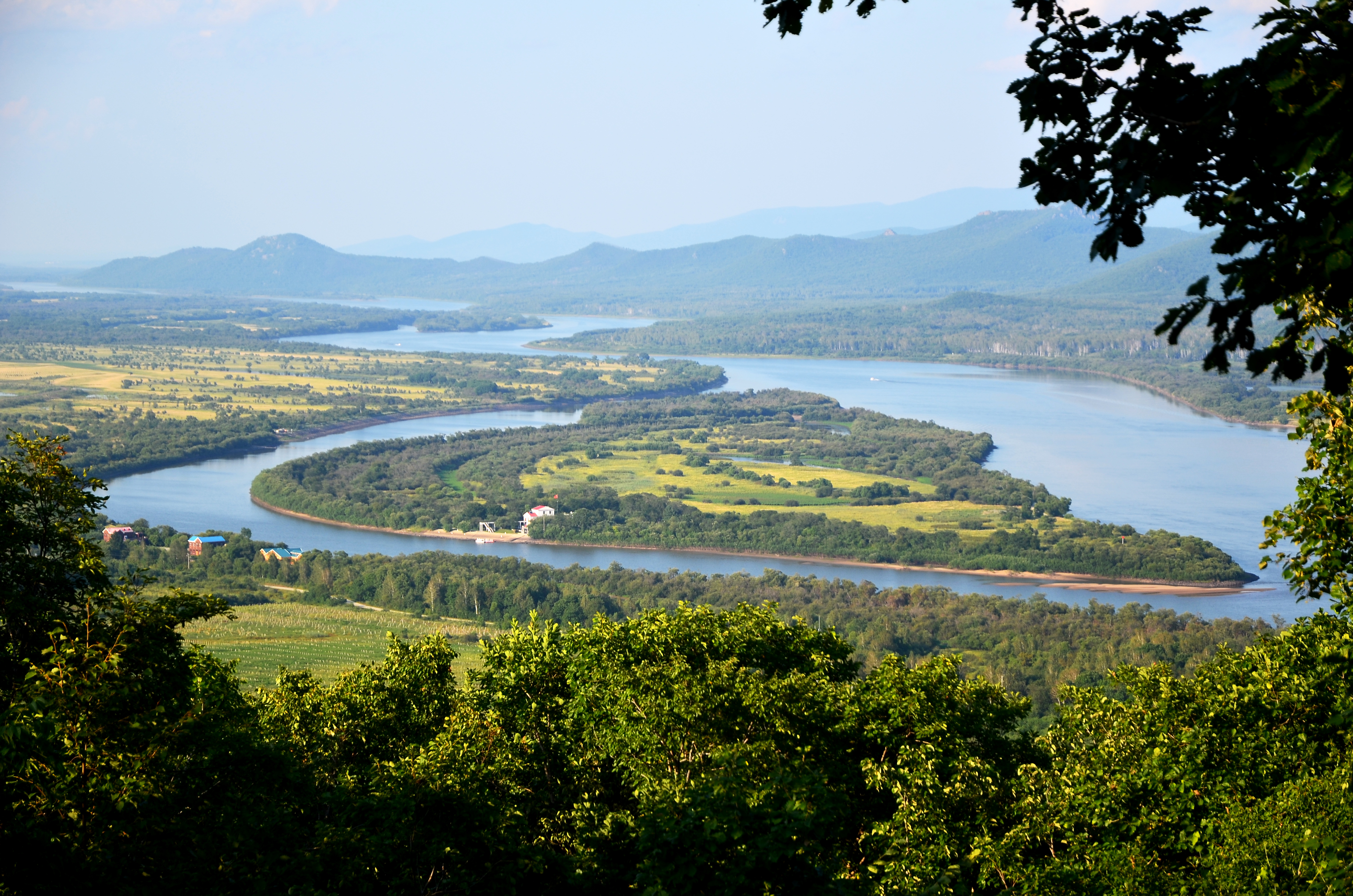
- Zhenbao Island

- Location within China
- Interactive map of Zhenbao Island

Ramsar Wetland
- Official name: Heilongjiang Zhenbaodao Wetland National Nature Reserve
- Designated: 1 September 2011
- Reference no.: 1978

Zhenbao Island (simplified Chinese: 珍宝岛; traditional Chinese: 珍寶島; pinyin: Zhēnbǎo dǎo; lit. 'Rare Treasure Island') or Damansky Island (Russian: о́стров Дама́нский, romanized: ostrov Damanskiy) is an island in Hulin, Jixi, Heilongjiang Province, China, with an area of only 0.74 square kilometres (0.29 sq mi). It is on the Ussuri River on the border between Primorsky Krai, Russia, and Heilongjiang Province, China.

Prior to the 1991 Sino-Soviet Border Agreement, the island was disputed between China and the Soviet Union. It got its Russian name from the railway engineer Stanislav Damansky, who died there in an incident in 1888 while he was charting the future route for the Trans-Siberian Railway.

== Conflict between Soviet Union and China ==
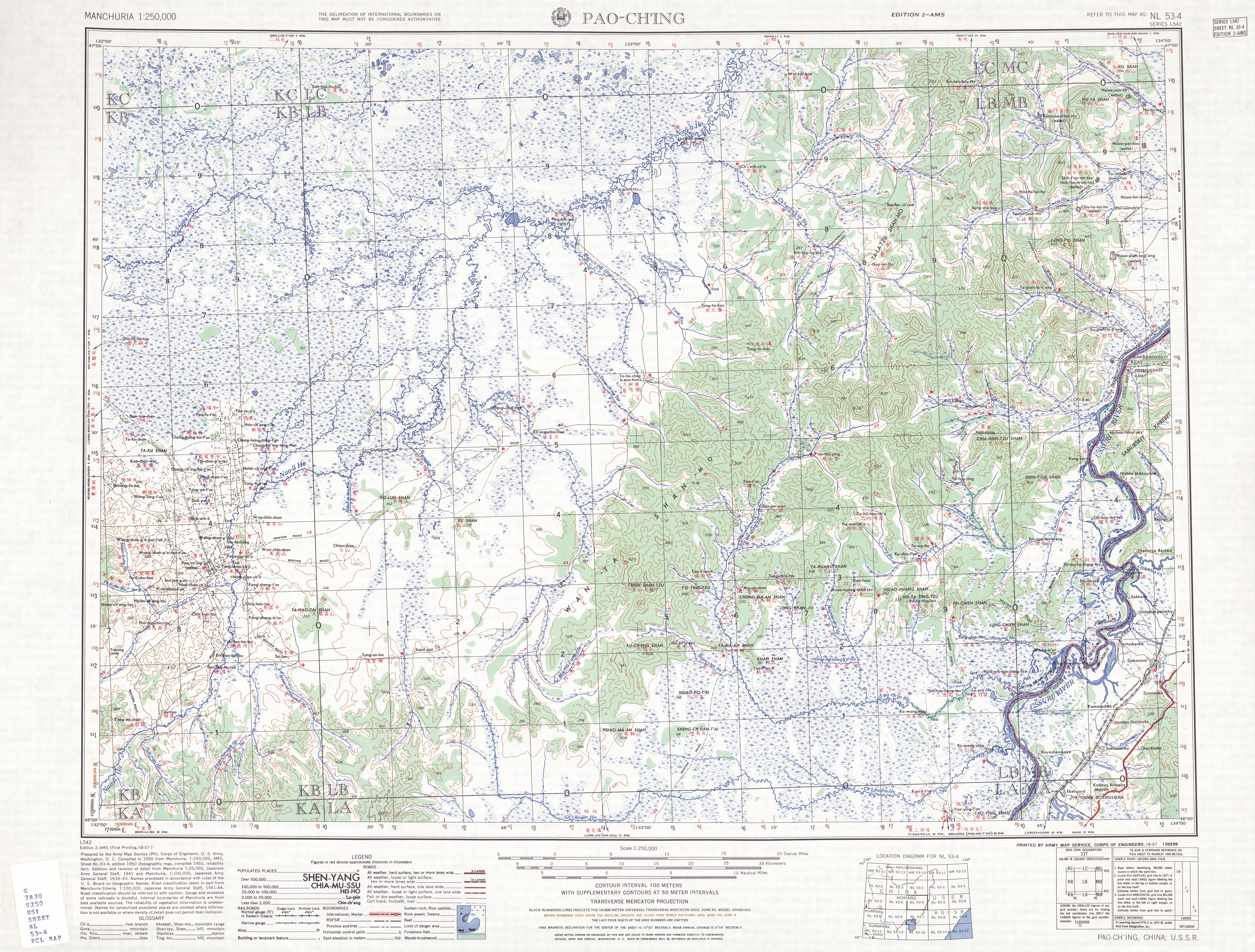
Map of the region showing the island at center right (square "MB, 1, 5") (AMS, 1957)

The island was the subject of a territorial dispute between the Soviet Union and China. China (PRC) held that "in the absence of an explicit treaty provision, the central line of the main channel—the Thalweg principle—provided a legal basis for delimiting the boundary in the two rivers. On this basis, Beijing claimed that 600 of the rivers' 700 islands—including Zhenbao Island on the Ussuri River, just 180 miles southwest of an important Soviet city, Khabarovsk—belonged to the P.R.C." Battles were fought with a considerable loss of life during the Sino-Soviet border conflict in mid-1969. The dispute over Zhenbao raised concerns that it could ignite World War III until an initial resolution of the conflict in November 1969.

In his memoir, US President Richard Nixon recounted a story that Premier Zhou Enlai (Chou En-lai) had told him about the border dispute:

Later on, when he had loosened up considerably, he told an amusing story that he said took place during a Sino-Soviet border flare-up in 1969. "We had a hot line between the Soviet Union and ourselves then," [Zhou] said, "but it had already become cold because the Kremlin never used it. At the time of the Chen Pao [Zhenbao Island] border incident, however, [Alexei] Kosygin picked it up and called us. When our operator answered, he said, 'This is Premier Kosygin. I would like to speak to Chairman Mao.' The operator, completely on his own, said, 'You are a revisionist, and therefore I will not connect you.' So Kosygin said, 'Well, if you will not try to reach the Chairman, will you please connect me with Prime Minister Chou.' But the operator gave the same unauthorized reply and broke the connection."

On 19 May 1991, both sides came to an agreement that the island was part of the territory of China, and the Soviet troops withdrew.

A 2004 Russian documentary film, Damansky Island Year 1969. ("Остров Даманский. 1969 год"), was made about the 1969 Zhenbao incident.

== See also ==
- Bolshoy Ussuriysky Island
- Outer Manchuria
- Renaming of geographical objects in the Russian Far East
