= Abagaitu Islet =

Island in Russia and China

Coordinates: 49°33′31″N 117°53′54″E

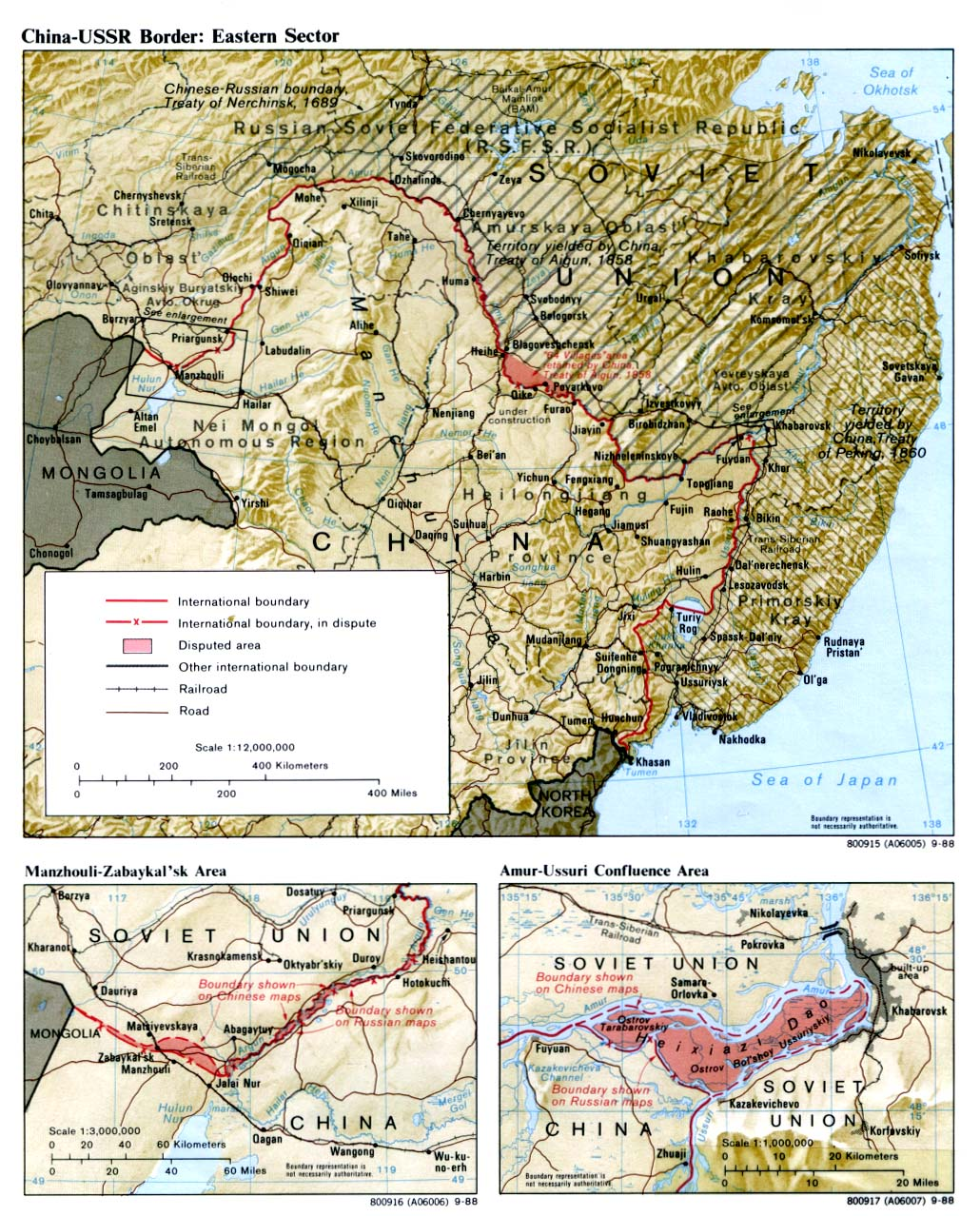
Abagaitu Islet is depicted in the inset map on the lower left.

Abagaitu Islet (simplified Chinese: 阿巴该图洲渚; traditional Chinese: 阿巴該圖洲渚; pinyin: Ābāgāitú Zhōuzhǔ; Russian: Большой остров, Bolshoy Ostrov) is an islet in the Argun River (Asia) divided between the People's Republic of China (Inner Mongolia Autonomous Region) and Russia (Chita Oblast). Its area is 58 square kilometres (22 square miles).

The island was occupied by the Soviet Union in 1929, a move not accepted by China, resulting in a border dispute that lasted more than seventy years.

On October 14, 2004, the Complementary Agreement between the People's Republic of China and the Russian Federation on the Eastern Section of the China–Russia Boundary was signed, in which Russia agreed to relinquish control over a part of Abagaitu Islet. In 2005, the Russian Duma and the Chinese National People's Congress approved the agreement.

== See also ==
- Bolshoy Ussuriysky Island
