= Bolshoy Ussuriysky Island =

Island at the confluence of the Amur and Ussuri rivers

Coordinates: 48°21′41″N 134°48′50″E

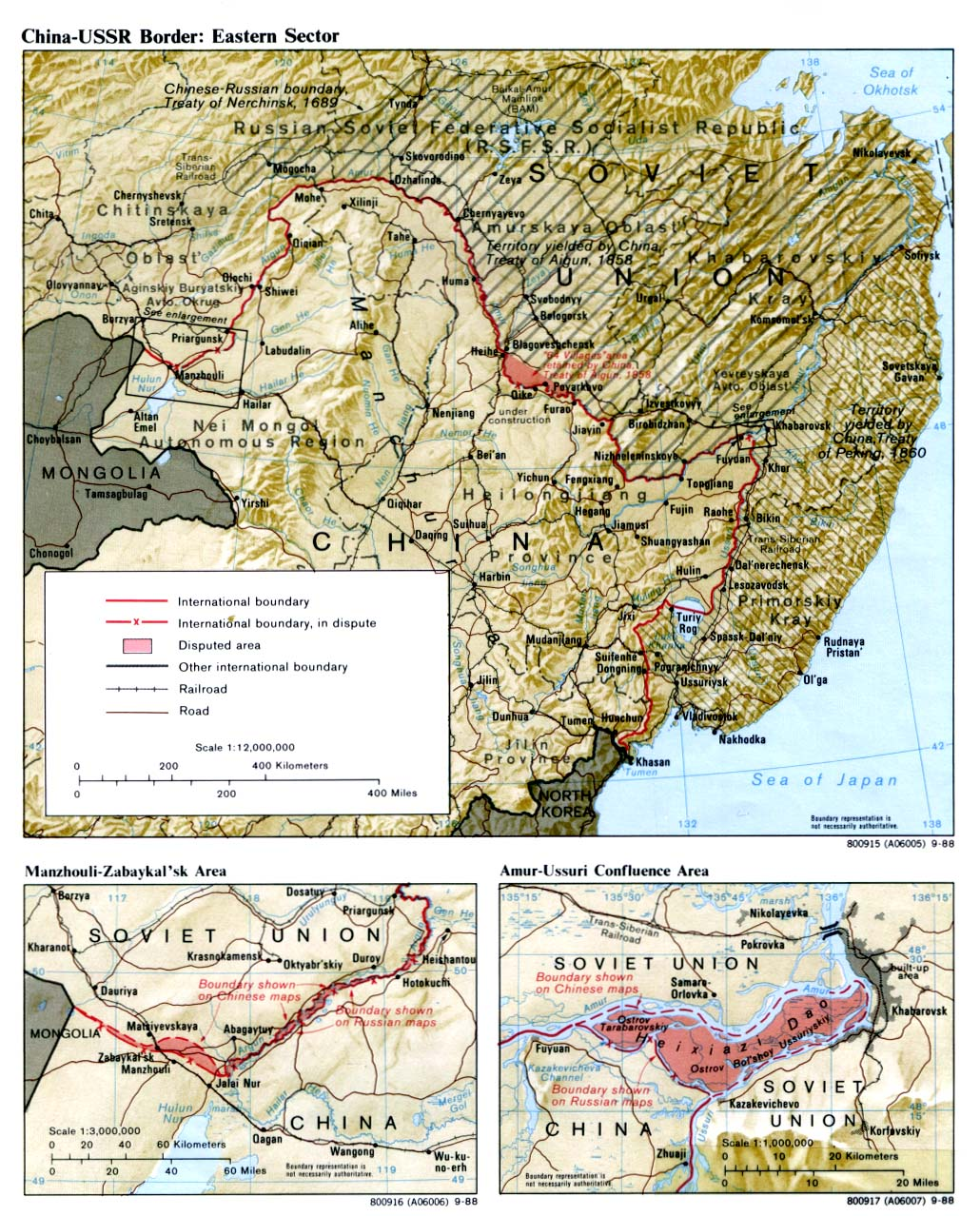
Bolshoi Ussuriysky / Heixiazi Island is depicted in the inset map on the lower right

Bolshoi Ussuriysky Island (Russian: Большо́й Уссури́йский о́стров, romanized: Bol'shoy Ussuriyskiy Ostrov), or Heixiazi Island (simplified Chinese: 黑瞎子岛; traditional Chinese: 黑瞎子島; pinyin: Hēixiāzi Dǎo; lit. 'black bear island' (Note: The word heixiazi is a Chinese nickname for Asian black bear, although it literally means “black blind” in standard Chinese.)), is a sedimentary island at the confluence of the Amur and Ussuri rivers. Since the Sino-Russian Border Agreement that was fully implemented in 2008, Bolshoy Ussuriysky Island was divided between China and Russia. Western part of the island and Yinlong/Tarabarov Island island were returned to China, and Russia retained the eastern part. Since then, the issue has been peacefully settled, and China no longer claims the entire island. It has an area of about 327 to 350 km^{2} and is bounded closely by Yinlong Island, and over 90 islets. (Note: In Chinese, Heixiazi may refer only to the large island or to the island group collectively) Its position at the confluence of the Amur and the Ussuri, and right next to the major Russian city of Khabarovsk, has given it great strategic importance.

== History ==
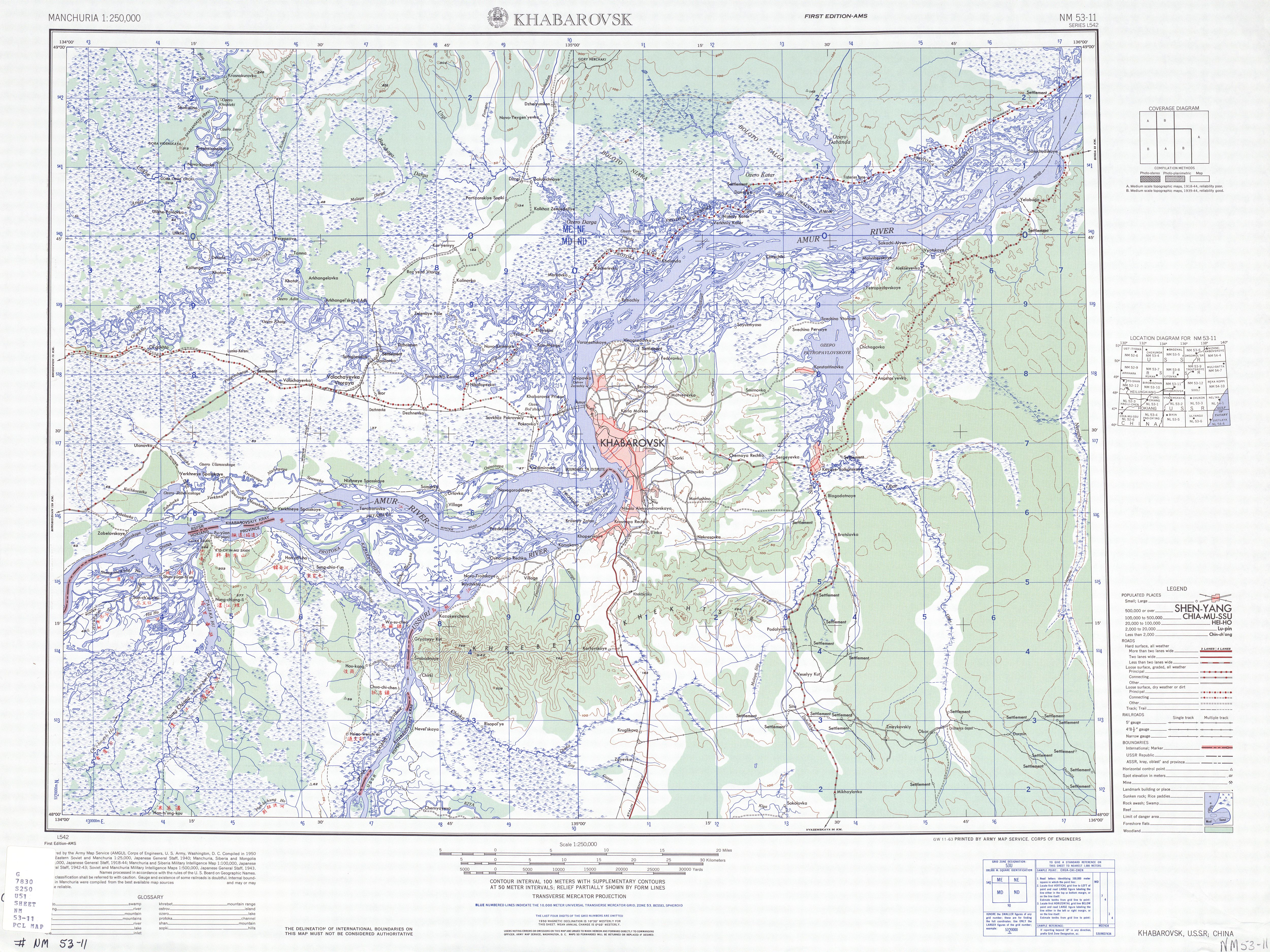
Map of Khabarovsk area including Bolshoy Ussuriysky Island (labeled BOUNDARY IN DISPUTE; AMS, 1950)

Map of Khabarovsk

The 1860 Convention of Peking stipulated that the boundary between China and Russia lay along the Amur and Ussuri rivers. Until 2004, Bolshoy Ussuriyskiy Island was the site of a territorial dispute between China and Russia. The Soviet Union forcefully occupied Bolshoy Ussuriyskiy and Yinlong Islands in 1929 in the wake of a Russo-Manchurian conflict, but this was not accepted by China. While Russia governed the islands as a part of Khabarovsk Krai, China claimed them as a part of Fuyuan County, Heilongjiang province, the easternmost part of China.

The difficulty in settling this dispute involved competing interests between China and Russia. To settle the boundary along the lines claimed by China would have subjected settled parts of the city of Khabarovsk to the range of artillery emplaced on Heixiazi. However, by occupying the entire island, Russia controlled the entire Amur and Ussuri waterway and gave Khabarovsk a comfortable buffer zone. During its control of the island, Russia refused navigational access to the Amur and Ussuri to Chinese ships.

On 14 October 2004, the Complementary Agreement between the People's Republic of China and the Russian Federation on the Eastern Section of the China-Russia Boundary was signed, in which Russia agreed to relinquish control over Yinlong Island and around half of Bolshoy Ussuriysky. About 170 square kilometres of Bolshoy Ussuriysky was transferred to China, while the rest remained under Russia's jurisdiction. In return, China agreed to drop all territorial claims to the remainder of Bolshoy Ussuriysky kept by Russia and received the right to navigate ships along the main channel of the Amur.

== Border agreements between China and Russia ==
Boundary established by the 2004–2005 border agreement

In 2005, the Russian Federal Assembly and the Chinese National People's Congress approved the Sino-Russian Border Agreement. On 21 July 2008, an agreement was signed in Beijing by the Chinese and Russian Foreign Ministers that finalized the border demarcation and formally ended negotiations. Under the agreement, Russia would transfer approximately 174 km^{2} of territory to China. The transfer took place on 14 October 2008. The area transferred to China is largely uninhabited. The Chinese part of the island is situated in the district of Fuyuan City in the province of Heilongjiang, China's easternmost county.

=== Controversy ===
The agreement was met with controversy on both sides of the border. In May 2005, Cossacks in Khabarovsk demonstrated against the loss of half of Bolshoy Ussuriysky. In return, some Chinese media commentators in Hong Kong, Taiwan and along with overseas Chinese groups criticized China for signing the agreement, which they regarded as sealing as permanent the loss of former Chinese territory such as Outer Manchuria to the Russian Federation.

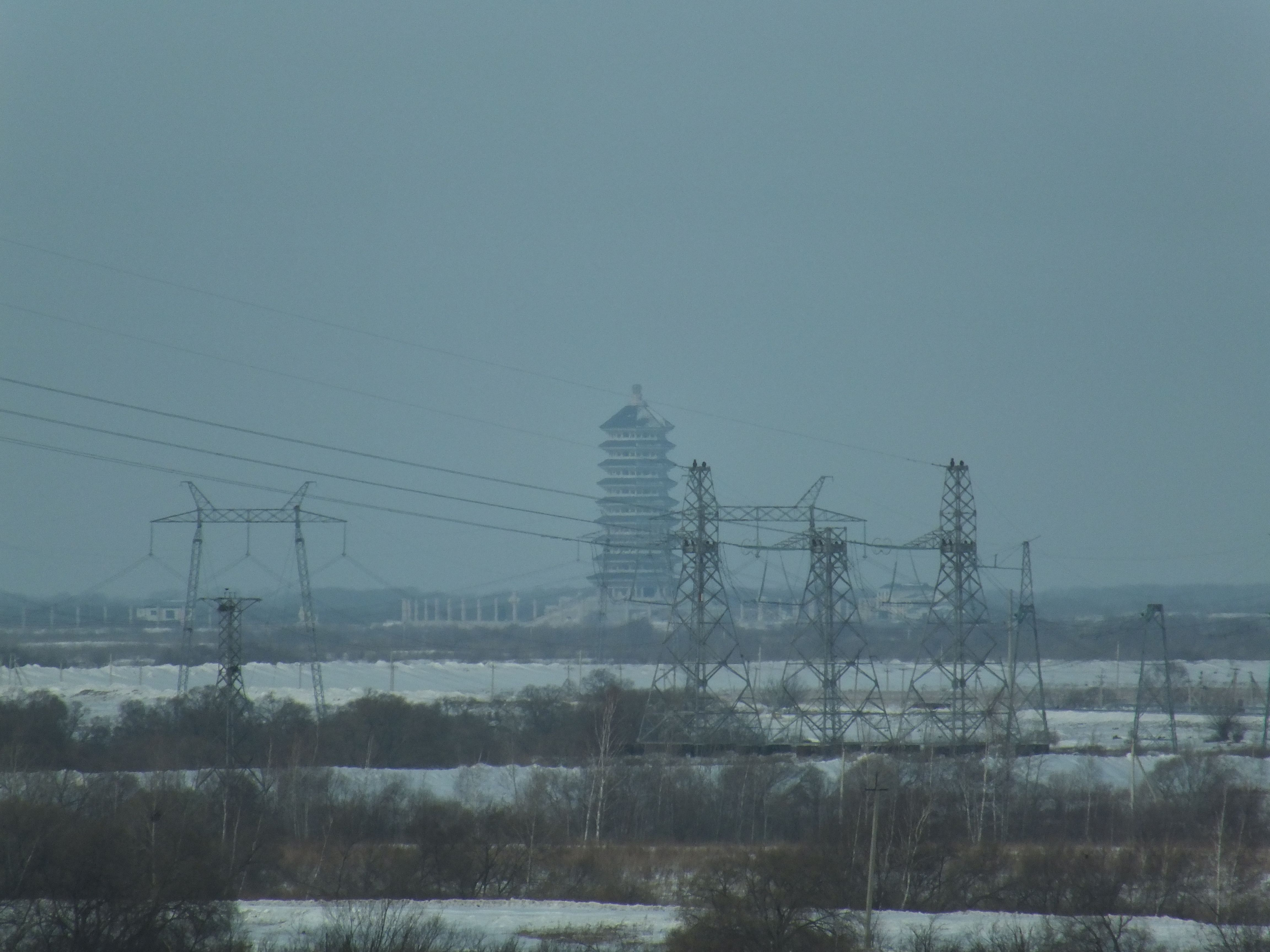
Chinese construction on the island as seen from the Russian portion, 2014

The Government of the Republic of China (ROC) in Taipei has never recognized the sovereignty of the PRC government in Beijing. Therefore, the ROC still formally claims all parts of the Heixiazi Islands, as it does not consider border treaties signed by the PRC with other countries to be valid.

According to a 2002 study by Iwashita Akihiro, a Japanese specialist on Slavic relations, "Most of Khabarovsk's local elites, in particular military, considered the islands of strategic importance since they fenced off Khabarovsk from China. If the border was drawn, relying upon the 'main channel principle', the two islands would have passed to China. This is why the Soviet Union insisted on the legal exceptionality of the two islands in its negotiations with China during the late 1980s, while strengthening its de facto control of these islands".

In 2023, the Chinese Global Times published the "2023 edition of China's standard map" that appeared to include all of the island's territory as China's. The map's publication led to some controversy in Japan and states in the South China Sea, while the Russian government made various statements since, claiming that "the border issue between our countries has been finally resolved", and signing a roadmap for the "joint development" of the island with the People's Republic of China in May 2024. Analysts have pointed out the issue is complex; while the Kremlin is keen to emphasise its sovereignty over its half of the island in theory, it seems to acknowledge its increased economic and strategic dependence on Beijing (which has heavily invested in developing its part of the island), and not so much interested in developing its share of Bolshoy Ussuriysky Island in practice.

== Geography ==
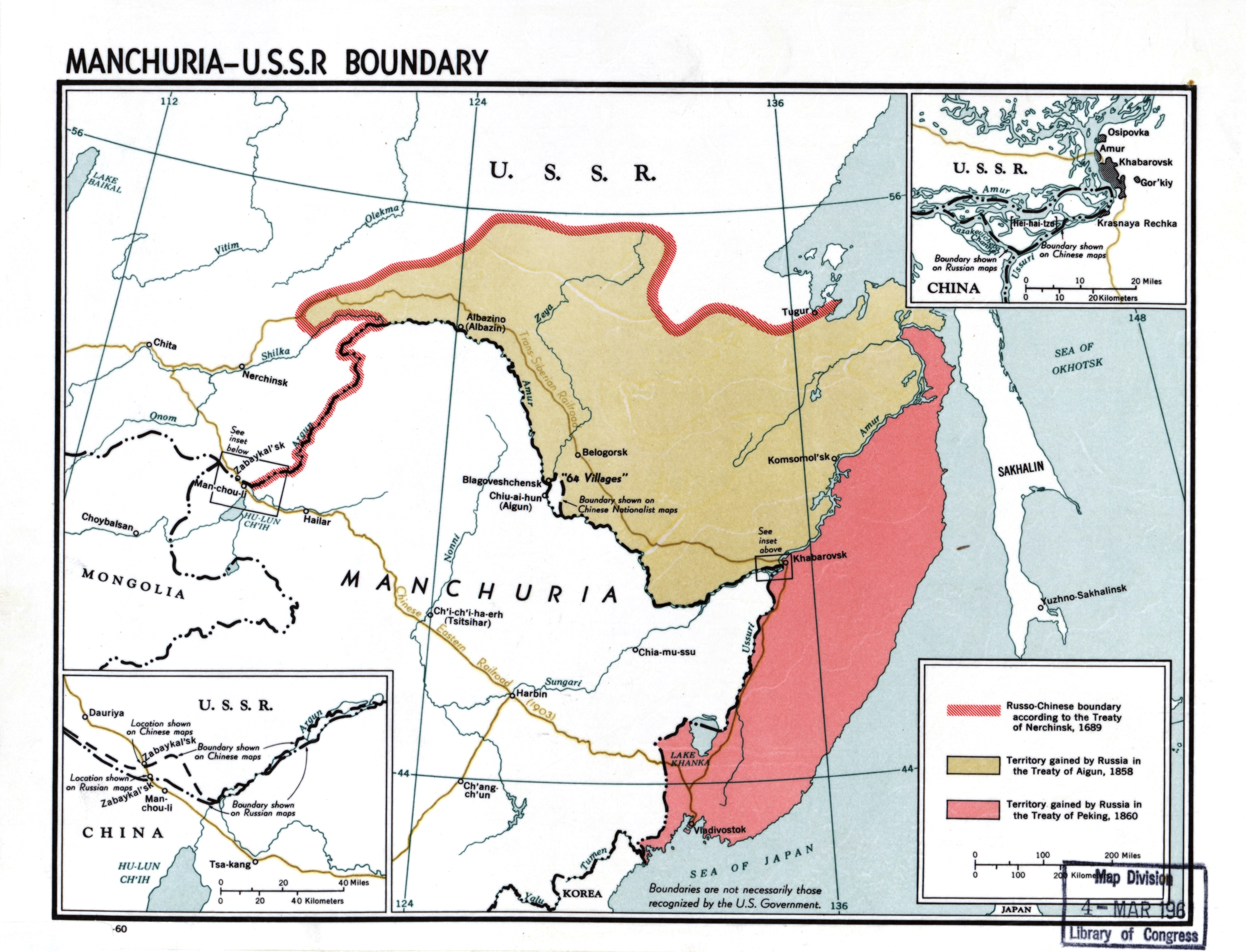
Map of the Chinese-Soviet border with an inset showing the boundaries claimed around Bolshoy Ussuriysky Island

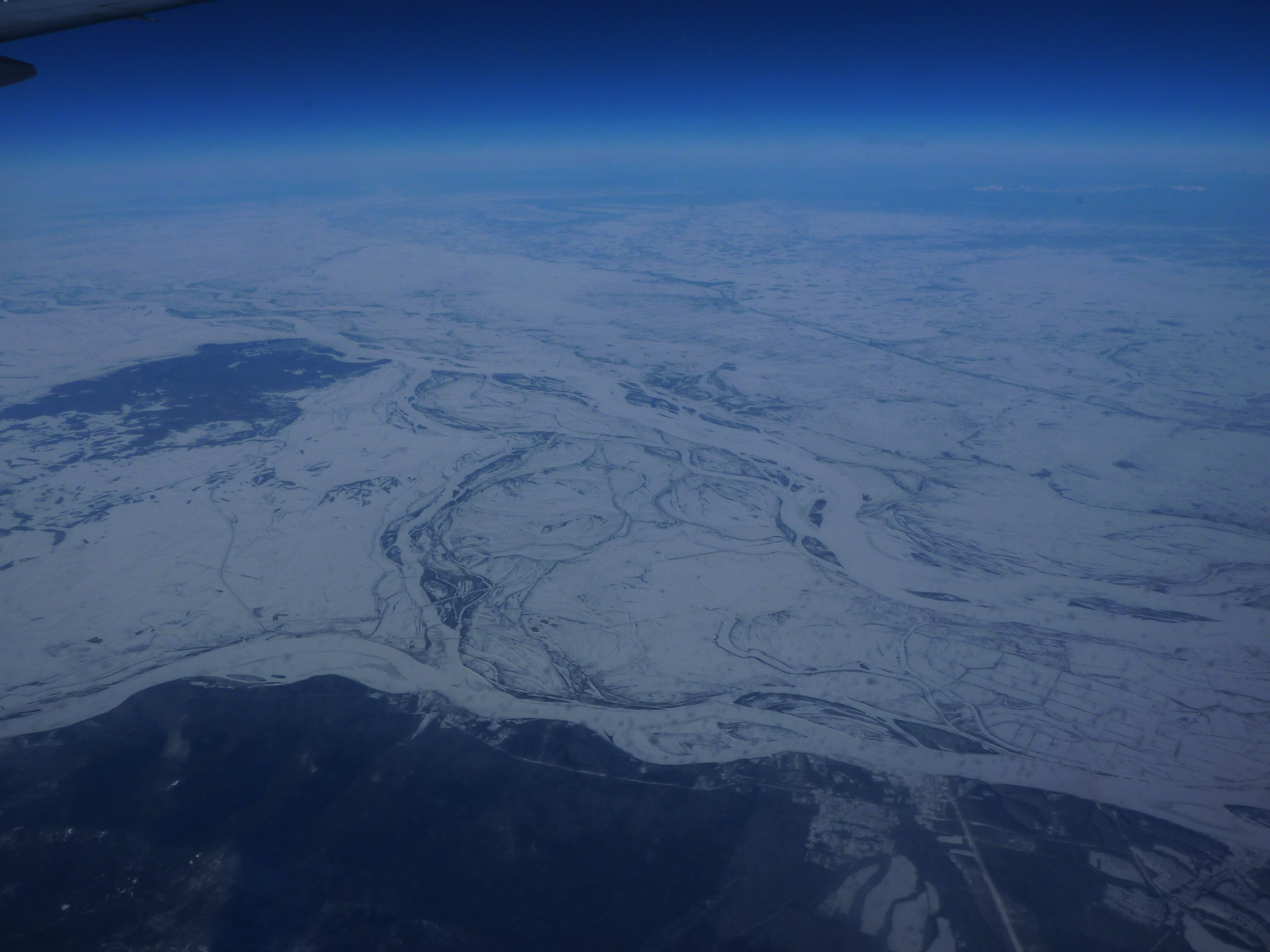
The Yinlong (Tarabarov; just above the center of the photo) and Bolshoy Ussuriysky (Heixiazi) Islands (runs from the center of the photo to the right edge of the frame). The international border is visible in the photo as a diagonal line (compare to its display on Google Maps).

The total area of these territories in the Khabarovsk region is approximately 340 square kilometres.

The Chinese section of the island is part of Fuyuan, Heilongjiang. The Russian section is part of Khabarovsky District of Khabarovsk Krai.

== Nature reserve ==
In 2015, the PRC registered the island as a nature reserve to protect biodiversity. The island hosts 505 species of flora and 351 species of fauna, 44 of which are nationally protected species, including the Siberian tiger. There is a "bear park" to contain black bears on the island.

== See also ==
- Sino-Russian border conflicts
- Treaty of Nerchinsk
- 1991 Sino-Soviet Border Agreement
- List of divided islands
- Abagaitu Islet
