= China–Russia border =

International border

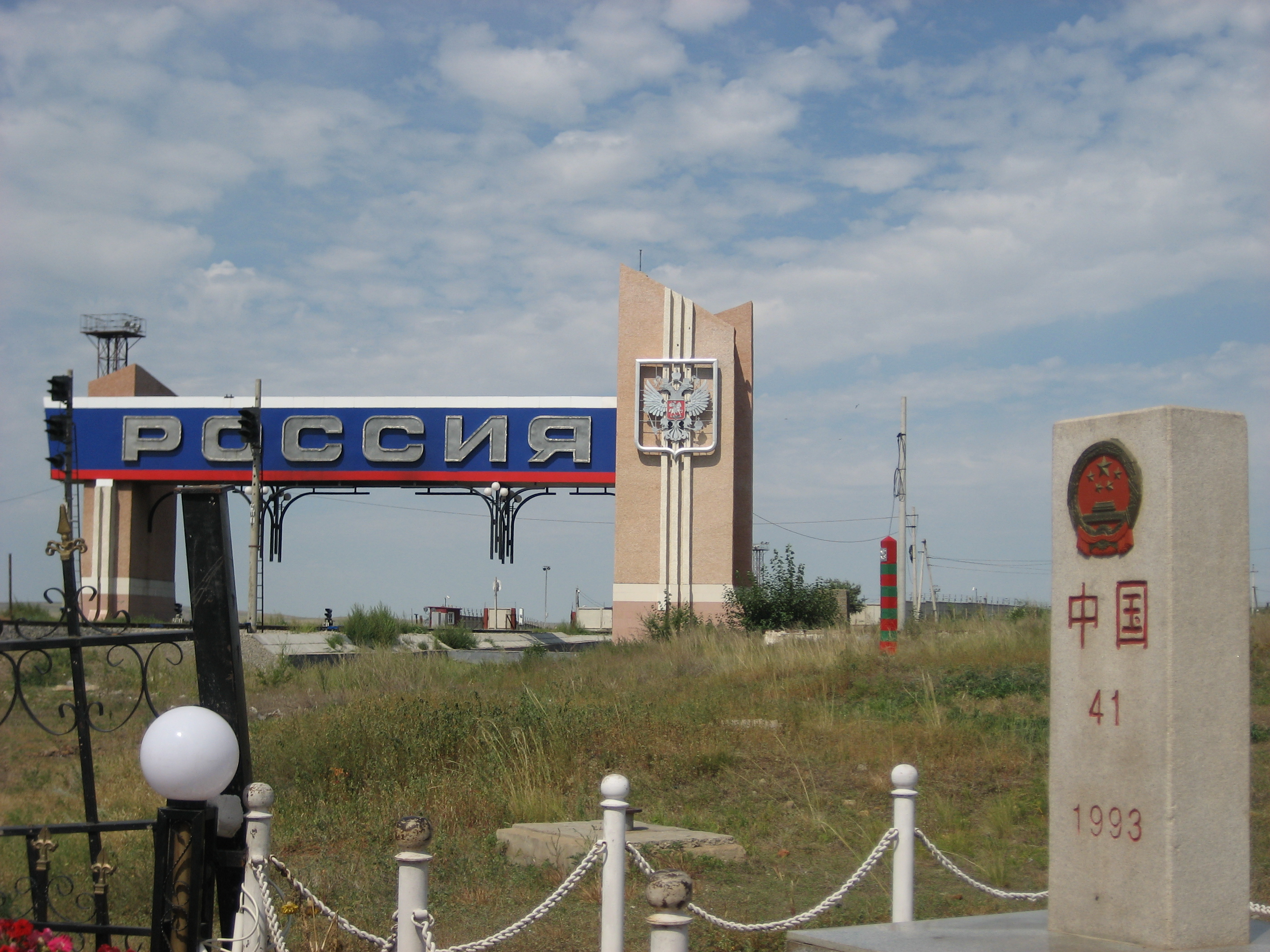
- The two countries' border signs at Manzhouli/Zabaykalsk

Characteristics
- Entities: China Russia
- Length: 4209.3 km

History
- Established: 17th century, 1991; Multiple treaties, 1991 Sino-Soviet Border Agreement
- Current shape: 2004; Complementary Agreement between China and Russia on the Eastern Section of the China–Russia Boundary
- Treaties: Treaty of Nerchinsk, Treaty of Kyakhta (1727), Treaty of Aigun, Convention of Peking, Treaty of Tarbagatai

Chinese and Russian boundary markers

After the final demarcation carried out in the early 2000s, the Chinese–Russian border or the Sino-Russian border measures 4,209.3 kilometres (2,615.5 mi), and is the world's fifth-longest international border. According to the Russian border agency, as of October 1, 2013, there are more than 160 land border crossings between Russia and China, all of which are open 24 hours. There are crossing points established by the treaty including railway crossings, highway crossings, river crossing, and mostly ferry crossings.

== Description ==
The eastern border section is over 4,000 kilometres (2,500 mi) in length. According to a joint estimate published in 1999, it measured at 4,195 kilometres (2,607 mi). It starts at the eastern China–Mongolia–Russia tripoint (49°50′42.3″N 116°42′46.8″E), marked by the border monument called Tarbagan-Dakh (Ta'erbagan Dahu, Tarvagan Dakh). From the tripoint, the border line runs north-east, until it reaches the Argun River. The border follows that river to the Amur River, and to the confluence of the latter with the Ussuri River. It divides the Bolshoy Ussuriysky Island at the confluence of the two rivers, and then runs south along the Ussuri. The border crosses Lake Khanka, and finally runs to the south-west. The China–Russia border ends when it reaches the Tumen River, which is the northern border of North Korea. The end point of the China–Russia border, and the China–North Korea–Russia tripoint, at (42°25′N 130°36′E), is located only a few kilometers before the river flows into the Pacific Ocean, the other end of the North Korea–Russia border.

The much shorter (about 55 kilometres (34 mi)) western border section is between Russia's Altai Republic and China's Xinjiang. It runs in the mostly snow-covered high elevation area of the Altai Mountains. Its western end point is the China–Kazakhstan–Russia tripoint, whose location is defined by the trilateral agreement as 49°06′54″N 87°17′12″E, elevation, 3327 m. Its eastern end is the western China–Mongolia–Russia tripoint, at the top of the peak Tavan Bogd Uul (Mt Kuitun), at the coordinates 49°10′13.5″N 87°48′56.3″E, elevation 4374 m.

== History ==
=== Tsarist era (pre-1917) ===
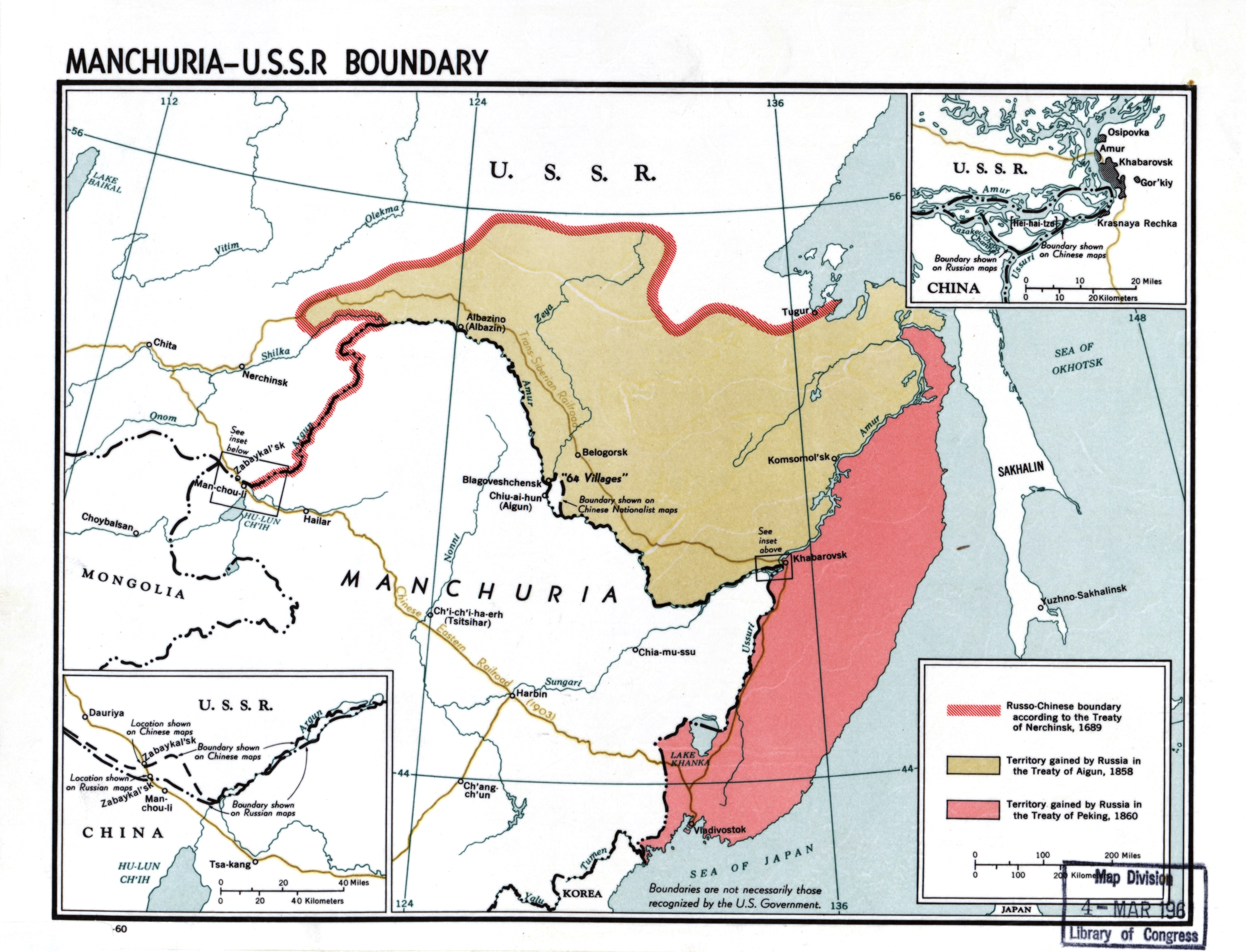
The shifting eastern border from 1689 to 1860

Today's Sino-Russian border line is mostly inherited by Russia (with minor adjustments) from the Soviet Union, while the Sino-Soviet border line was essentially the same as the border between the Russian and Qing Empires, settled by a number of treaties from the 17th through to the 19th centuries. Border issues first became an issue following Russia's rapid expansion into Siberia in the 17th century, with intermittent skirmishes occurring between them and Qing China. Below is a list of important border treaties, along with the indication as to which section of today's Sino-Russian border were largely set by them:

- Treaty of Nerchinsk (1689) – this covered the far eastern section of the border, creating a line along the Argun River and Shilka River, then proceeding overland via the Stanovoy Mountains, and then along the Uda river, terminating at the Tugur peninsula by the Sea of Okhotsk.
- Treaty of Kyakhta (1727), plus supplementary protocols of the same year – these were concerned mostly with the border line that is currently the Mongolia–Russia border (Mongolia then being part of China), this fixing a line from the river Irtysh in the west to the Argun in the east.
- Treaty of Aigun (1858) – this shifted the eastern border to run along the Amur River out to the Okhotsk.
- Convention of Peking (1860) – this finalised the eastern stretch of the border, with China ceding to Russia the territory of modern Primorsky Krai and southern Khabarovsk Krai, created the short border between Russia and the Korean Peninsula, leaving Noktundo at the Russian side and blocking China's access to the Sea of Japan.
- Treaty of Tarbagatai (1864) – this created the western section of the border in Central Asia, with the bulk of this border now forming China's borders with Kazakhstan, Kyrgyzstan and Tajikistan (with modifications). The border was modified via later treaties such as the Treaty of Saint Petersburg (1881), though the modern Russian section remained at the same place.
- Qiqihar Agreement (1911) – modified the eastern border along the Argun slightly, however China later repudiated the treaty.

=== Sino-Soviet border (1917–1991) ===
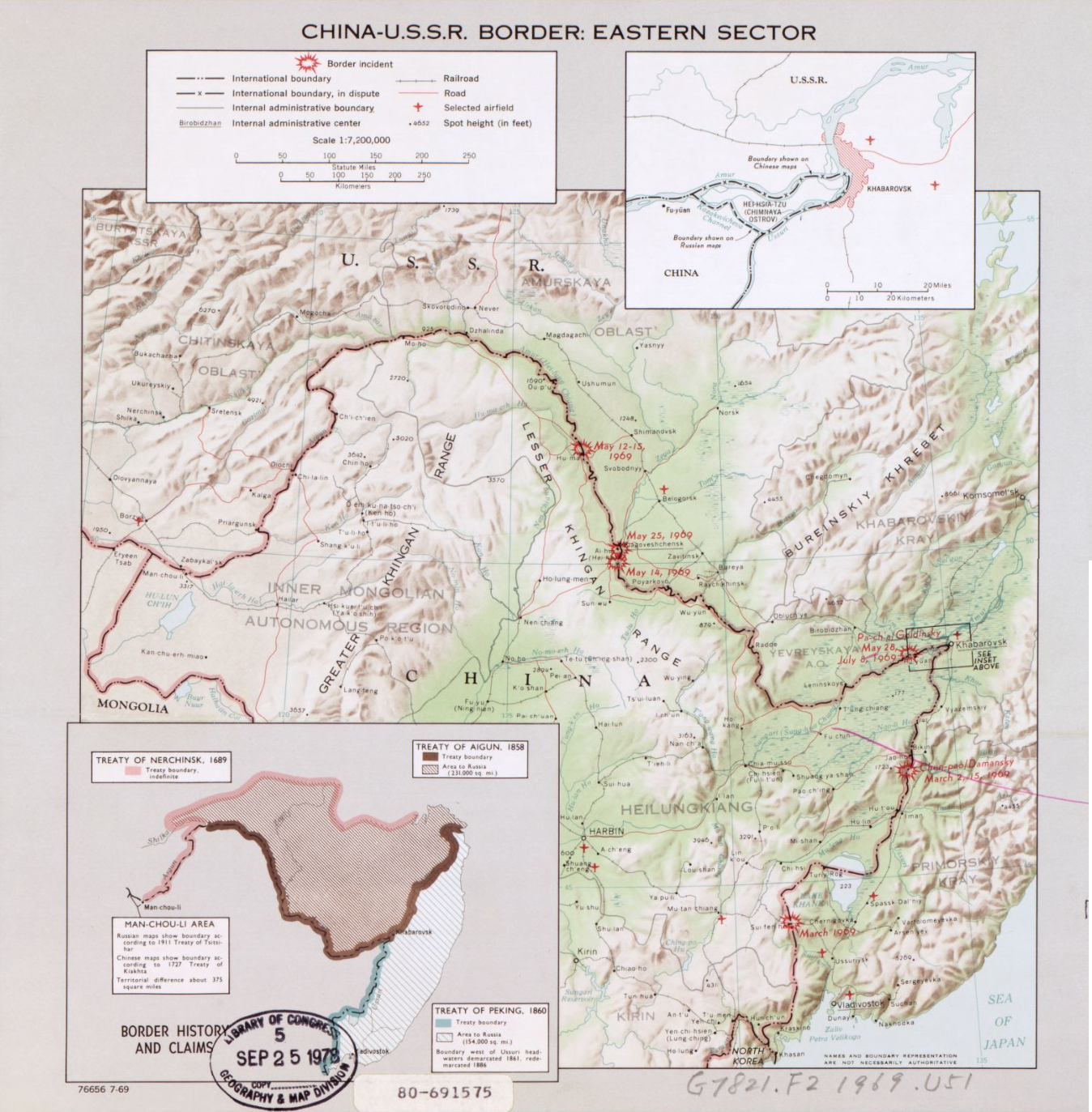
Map showing the locations of major clashes during the 1969 border war

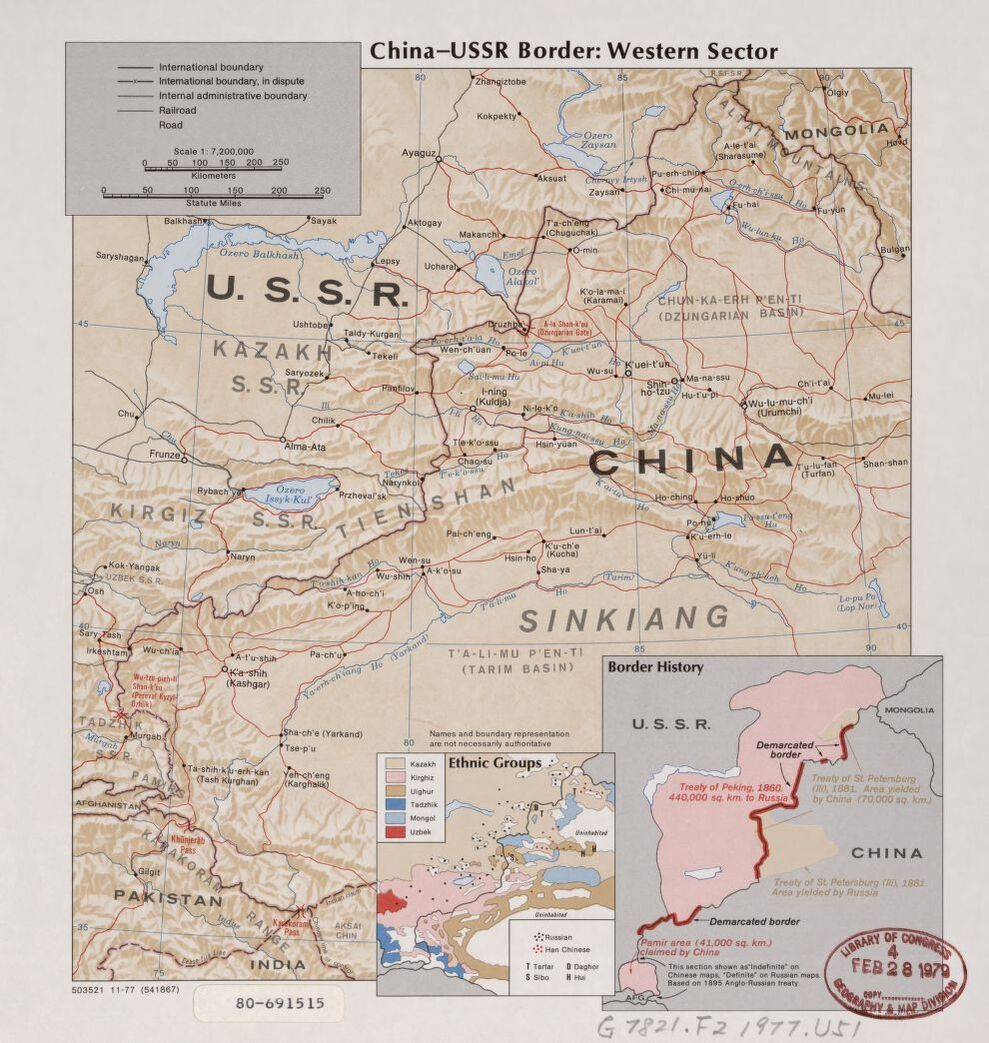
Western section of the border in the 1970s

Following the Russian Revolution in 1917 and the later formation of the Soviet Union, there have been a number of issues along the border:

- In 1911 Outer Mongolia declared independence from China; the USSR recognised the country in 1921, thus removing a large part of the China–USSR border and splitting it into two sections. China later recognised Mongolian independence in 1946.
- Sino-Soviet conflict (1929) – a conflict largely centred on the Chinese Eastern Railway.
- Sino-Soviet border conflict (1969) – this was a serious seven-month undeclared military conflict between the Soviet Union and China at the height of the Sino-Soviet split in 1969 (China having been taken over by Communists in 1949). Although military clashes ceased that year, the underlying issues were not resolved until the 1991 Sino-Soviet Border Agreement. The most serious of these border clashes, which brought the two countries to the brink of all-out war, occurred in March 1969 in the vicinity of Zhenbao (Damansky) Island on the Ussuri (Wusuli) River; as such, Chinese historians most commonly refer to the conflict as the Zhenbao Island Incident. Heavily militarised following the war, the border slowly opened after 1982, allowing the first exchange of goods between the two countries, though the territorial disputes remained unresolved. Between 1988 and 1992 the cross-border commerce between Russia and Heilongjiang province increased threefold, with the number of legal Chinese workers in Russia increasing from 1,286 to 18,905.

Three countries bordered both China and the Soviet Union: Afghanistan, Mongolia and North Korea. Both the Democratic Republic of Afghanistan and Mongolian People's Republic were pro-Soviet satellite states during the Cold War, while the Democratic People's Republic of Korea was neutral.

=== Post-1991 ===
The waning years of the Soviet Union saw a reduction of the tensions on the then heavily fortified Sino-Soviet border. In 1990–91, the two countries agreed to significantly reduce their military forces stationed along the border. To this day one can find numerous abandoned military facilities in Russia's border districts.

Even though the Sino-Soviet border trade resumed as early as 1983–1985, it accelerated in 1990–91; the rate of cross-border trade continued to increase as the USSR's former republics became separate states. To accommodate increasing volume of travel and private trade, a number of border crossings were re-opened. In early 1992, China announced border trade incentives and the creation of special economic zones (SEZs) along the Sino-Russian border, the largest of these being in Hunchun, Jilin.

In 1991, China and USSR signed the 1991 Sino-Soviet Border Agreement, which was intended to start the process of resolving the border disputes held in abeyance since the 1960s. The border agreement was witnessed by General Secretary of the Chinese Communist Party Jiang Zemin and General Secretary of the Communist Party of the Soviet Union Mikhail Gorbachev during Jiang's official visit to the Soviet Union on May 16, 1991. However, just a few months later the USSR was dissolved, and four former Soviet republics – Russia, Kazakhstan, Kyrgyzstan, and Tajikistan – inherited various sections of the former Sino–Soviet border.

It took more than a decade for Russia and China to fully resolve the border issues and to demarcate the border. On May 29, 1994, during Russian prime minister Viktor Chernomyrdin's visit to Beijing, an "Agreement on the Sino-Russian Border Management System intended to facilitate border trade and hinder criminal activity" was signed. On September 3, a demarcation agreement was signed for the short (55 kilometres (34 mi)) western section of the binational border; the demarcation of this section was completed in 1998.

In November 1997, at a meeting in Beijing, Russian President Boris Yeltsin and Chinese leader, CCP General Secretary Jiang Zemin signed an agreement for the demarcation of the much longer (over 4,000 kilometres (2,500 mi)) eastern section of the border, in accordance with the provisions of the 1991 Sino-Soviet agreement.

The last unresolved territorial issue between the two countries was settled by the 2004 Complementary Agreement between China and Russia on the Eastern Section of the China–Russia Boundary. Pursuant to that agreement, Russia transferred to China a part of Abagaitu Islet, the entire Yinlong (Tarabarov) Island, about half of Bolshoy Ussuriysky Island, and some adjacent river islets. The transfer was ratified by both the Chinese National People's Congress and the Russian State Duma in 2005, thus ending the decades-long border dispute. The official transfer ceremony was held on-site on October 14, 2008.

== Border management ==
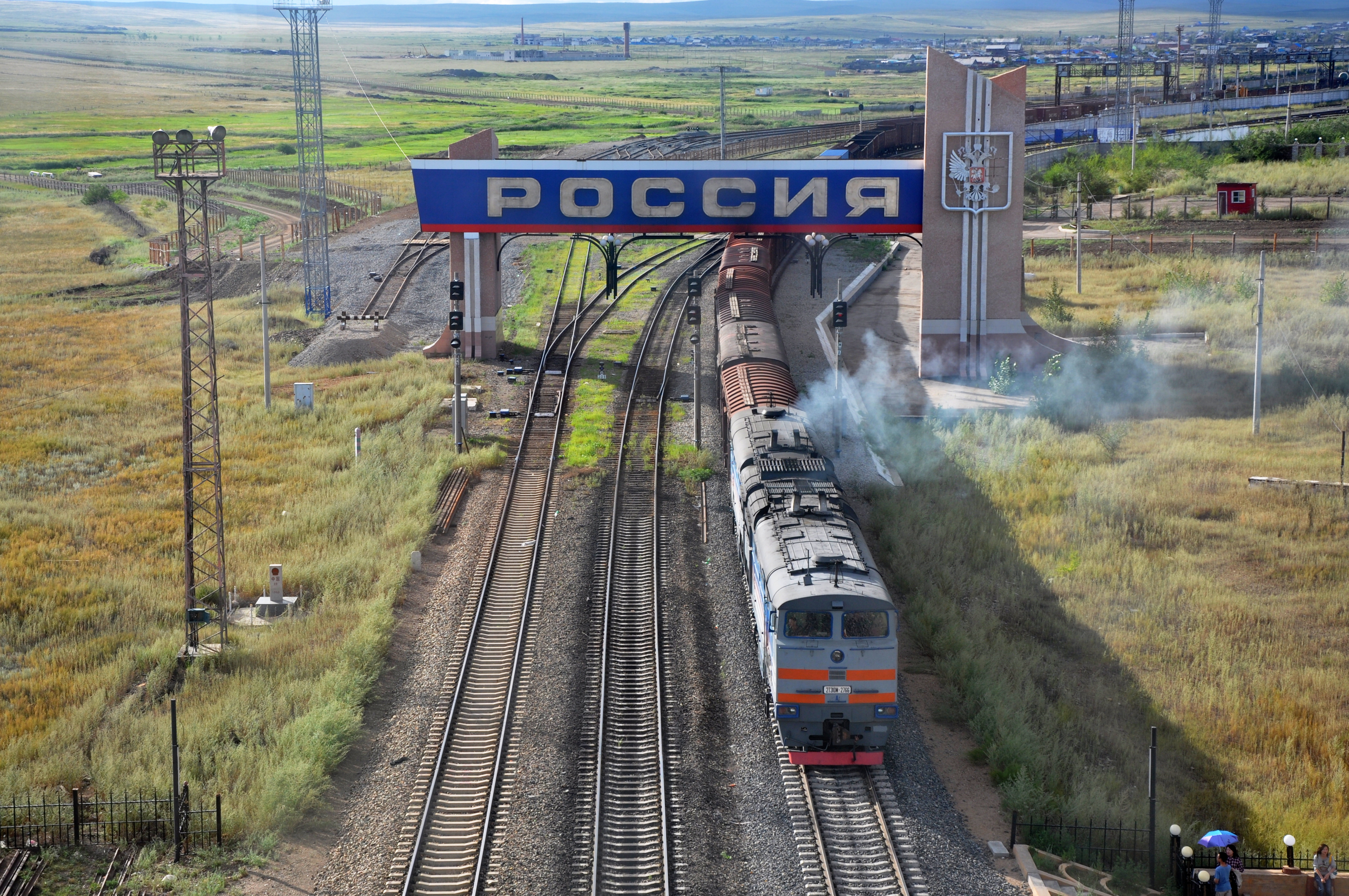
A train passing the border crossing from Zabaykalsk in Russia to Manzhouli in China. The banner reads "Rossiya", Russia in the Russian language (coordinates: 49°37′49.24″N 117°20′20.68″E)

As with many other international borders, a bilateral treaty exists concerning the physical modalities of managing the China–Russia border. The currently valid agreement was signed in Beijing in 2006.

The treaty requires the two states to clear trees in a 15 metres (49 ft)-wide strip along the border (i.e. within 7.5 metres (25 ft) from the border line on each side of it) (Article 6).

Civil navigation is allowed on the border rivers and lakes, provided the vessels of each country stay on the appropriate side of the dividing line (Article 9); similar rules apply to fishing in these waters (Article 10). Each country's authorities will carry out appropriate measures to prevent grazing livestock from crossing into the other country and will endeavor to apprehend and return any livestock that wanders onto their territory from across the border (Article 17). Hunting using firearms is prohibited within 1,000 metres (3,300 ft) from the borderline; hunters are prohibited from crossing the border in pursuit of a wounded animal (Article 19).

Detained illegal border crossers are supposed to be normally returned to their country of origin within 7 days from their apprehension (Article 34).

== Border crossings ==
=== Eastern section ===
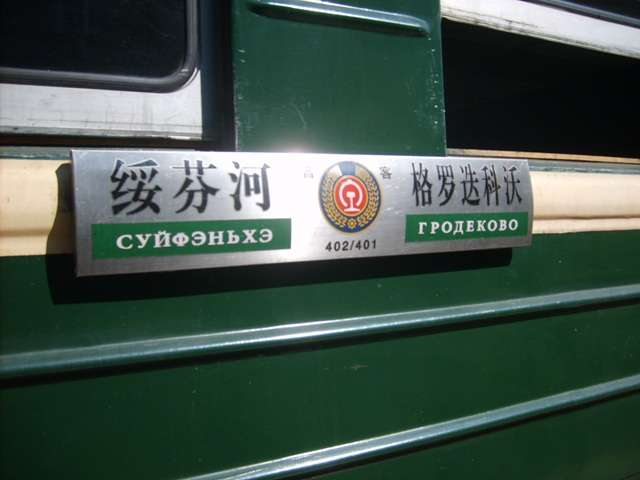
A special passenger train operates between the two border stations on the eastern section of the former Chinese Eastern Railway, Suifenhe and Grodekovo

A list of ports-of-entry on the eastern section is provided by China Association of Port-of-entry:

China–Russia border crossings (eastern section)
Name	Type of crossing transports	Bordering Chinese town	Bordering Russian town	Open to third country nationals	Notes
Hunchun South-Kameshovaya/Makhalino	railway	Hunchun, Yanbian, Jilin	Kraskino, Khasansky District, Primorsky Krai	No	the only railway crossing at Jilin section
Hunchun-Kraskino	road	Hunchun, Yanbian, Jilin	Kraskino, Khasansky District, Primorsky Krai	Yes	the only road crossing at Jilin section, connects G609 (with indirectly G12, G302, G331 and G610)
Dongning-Poltavka	road	Sanchakou, Dongning, Mudanjiang, Heilongjiang	Poltavka, Oktyabrsky District, Primorsky Krai	No	connects G331 and G602 indirectly, valid for Russian e-Visa
Suifenhe-Grodekovo	railway	Suifenhe, Mudanjiang, Heilongjiang	Pogranichny, Pogranichny District, Primorsky Krai	Yes	401/402 train (401E/402E) runs through here everyday, valid for Russian e-Visa
Suifenhe-Pogranichny	road	Suifenhe, Mudanjiang, Heilongjiang	Pogranichny, Pogranichny District, Primorsky Krai	Yes	connects G10 (with indirectly G301, G331 and G602) and 05A-215, part of AH6
Mishan-Turiy Rog	road	Dangbi, Mishan, Jixi, Heilongjiang	Turiy Rog, Khankaysky District, Primorsky Krai	No	connects G501 (with indirectly G1115 and G331), nearby Lake Khanka, valid for Russian e-Visa
Hulin-Markovo	road	Hulin, Jixi, Heilongjiang	Markovo, Lesozavodsk, Primorsky Krai	No	connects G1115, G331 and G602 indirectly
Raohe-Pokrovka	shipping	Raohe, Shuangyashan, Heilongjiang	Pokrovka, Bikin, Khabarovsk Krai	No	boats available during spring through autumn, car crossing in winter only, connects G229, G331 and G601 indirectly when car traffic available
Heixiazi-Bolshoy Ussuriysky	road	Fuyuan, Jiamusi, Heilongjiang	Khabarovsk, Khabarovsk Krai		planned, expected only aboriginal peoples of the island and nearby towns can cross, will connect G1012 and G102 indirectly
Fuyuan-Khabarovsk	shipping	Fuyuan, Jiamusi, Heilongjiang	Khabarovsk, Khabarovsk Krai	Yes	currently the easternmost port-of-entry of China in use, boats available during spring through autumn, car crossing in winter only, connects G1012, G102, G331 and G601 indirectly when car traffic available
Tongjiang-Nizhneleninskoye	railway	Tongjiang, Jiamusi, Heilongjiang	Nizhneleninskoye, Leninsky District, Jewish Autonomous Oblast	No	See also: Tongjiang-Nizhneleninskoye railway bridge
Tongjiang-Nizhneleninskoye	shipping	Tongjiang, Jiamusi, Heilongjiang	Nizhneleninskoye, Leninsky District, Jewish Autonomous Oblast	No	boats available during spring through autumn, hovercraft and car crossing in winter only, connects G1011, G221 and G331 indirectly when car traffic available
Fujin	shipping	Fujin, Jiamusi, Heilongjiang	n/a	No	international boats to ports of Nizhneleninskoye, Khabarovsk, Komsomolsk, Nikolayevsk and Sea of Japan
Jiamusi	shipping	Jiamusi, Heilongjiang	n/a	No	international boats to ports of Nizhneleninskoye, Khabarovsk, Komsomolsk, Nikolayevsk and Sea of Japan
Luobei-Amurzet	shipping	Luobei, Hegang, Heilongjiang	Amurzet, Jewish Autonomous Oblast	Yes	boats available during spring through autumn, car crossing in winter only, connects G332 (with indirectly G331) when car traffic available
Harbin	railway	Harbin, Heilongjiang	n/a	Yes	Trans-Eurasia Logistics dry port, was the terminus of K7023/7024 Harbin-Khabarovsk/Vladivostok Train (005/006/351/352)
Harbin	shipping	Harbin, Heilongjiang	n/a		was having international boats to ports of Khabarovsk, Komsomolsk, Nikolayevsk, Blagoveshchensk and Sea of Japan, unavailable in recent years
Jiayin-Pashkovo	shipping	Jiayin, Yichun, Heilongjiang	Pashkovo, Obluchensky District, Jewish Autonomous Oblast		currently under renovation, if re-opened, it may connect G222 (with indirectly G331) during winter
Xunke-Poyarkovo	shipping	Xunke, Heihe, Heilongjiang	Poyarkovo, Mikhaylovsky District, Amur Oblast	No	boats available during spring through autumn, hovercraft and car crossing in winter only, connects G331 indirectly
Sunwu-Konstantinovka	shipping	Sunwu, Heihe, Heilongjiang	Konstantinovka, Konstantinovsky District, Amur Oblast		currently not available as there are concerns at Amur Oblast authorities, if opened in the future, it may connect G202 indirectly during winter
Heihe-Blagoveshchensk	road	Heihe, Heilongjiang	Blagoveshchensk, Amur Oblast	Yes	Main article: Blagoveshchensk–Heihe Bridge connects G1211 (with indirectly G202, G331, G603 and G604), part of AH31
Heihe-Blagoveshchensk	pedestrian (gondola)	Heihe, Heilongjiang	Blagoveshchensk, Amur Oblast		under construction
Heihe-Blagoveshchensk	shipping	Heihe, Heilongjiang	Blagoveshchensk, Amur Oblast	Yes	boats available during spring through autumn, hovercraft and car crossing in winter only
Huma-Ushakovo	shipping	Huma, Daxing'anling, Heilongjiang	Ushakovo, Shimanovsky District, Amur Oblast		currently not available as there are concerns at Amur Oblast authorities, if opened in the future, it may connect G331 and G605 indirectly during winter
Mohe-Dzhalinda	shipping	Mohe, Daxing'anling, Heilongjiang	Dzhalinda, Skovorodinsky District, Amur Oblast	No	boats available during spring through autumn, car crossing in winter only, connects G111 (with indirectly G1213 and G331) when car traffic available
Shiwei-Olochi	road	Shiwei, Ergun, Hulunbuir, Inner Mongolia	Olochi, Nerchinsko-Zavodsky District, Zabaykalsky Krai	No	connects G644
Heishantou-Starotsurukhaitu	road	Ergun, Hulunbuir, Inner Mongolia	Starotsurukhaitu, Priargunsky District, Zabaykalsky Krai	No	Valid for Russian e-Visa
Manzhouli-Zabaykalsk	road	Manzhouli, Hulunbuir, Inner Mongolia	Zabaykalsk, Zabaykalsky District, Zabaykalsky Krai	Yes	connects G10, G301 (with indirectly G331 and G623) and A 350, part of AH6
Manzhouli-Zabaykalsk	railway	Manzhouli, Hulunbuir, Inner Mongolia	Zabaykalsk, Zabaykalsky District, Zabaykalsky Krai	Yes	prior to COVID-19 pandemic, K19/20 train (019Ch/020She) runs through here, break-of-gauge at Zabaykalsk, valid for Russian e-Visa

=== Western section ===
According to Russian topographic maps, the lowest mountain passes on the western section of the border are the Betsu-Kanas Pass (перевал Бетсу-Канас), elevation 2,671.3 metres (8,764 ft) and Kanas (перевал Канас), elevation 2,650 metres (8,690 ft). No roads suitable for wheeled vehicles exist over these two passes, although a difficult dirt road approaches from the Russian side to within 10 kilometres (6.2 mi) from the Kanas Pass. Until the Soviet authorities closed the border in 1936, Kazakh nomads would occasionally use these passes.

Proposals exist for the construction of a cross-border highway and the Altai gas pipeline from China to Russia, which would cross the western section of the Sino-Russian border.

== Historical maps ==
Historical maps of the border from west to east in the International Map of the World, mid-20th century:

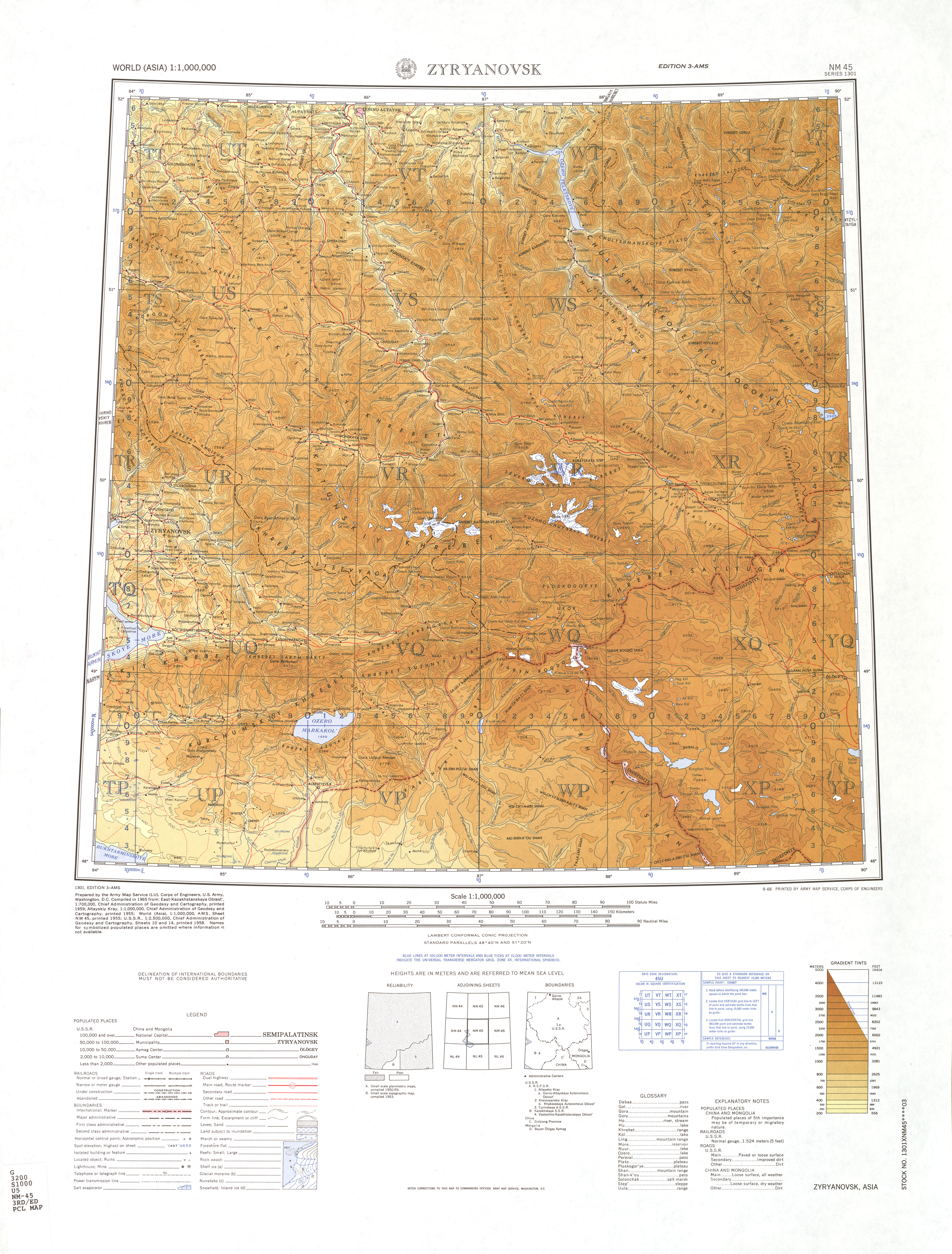
western section

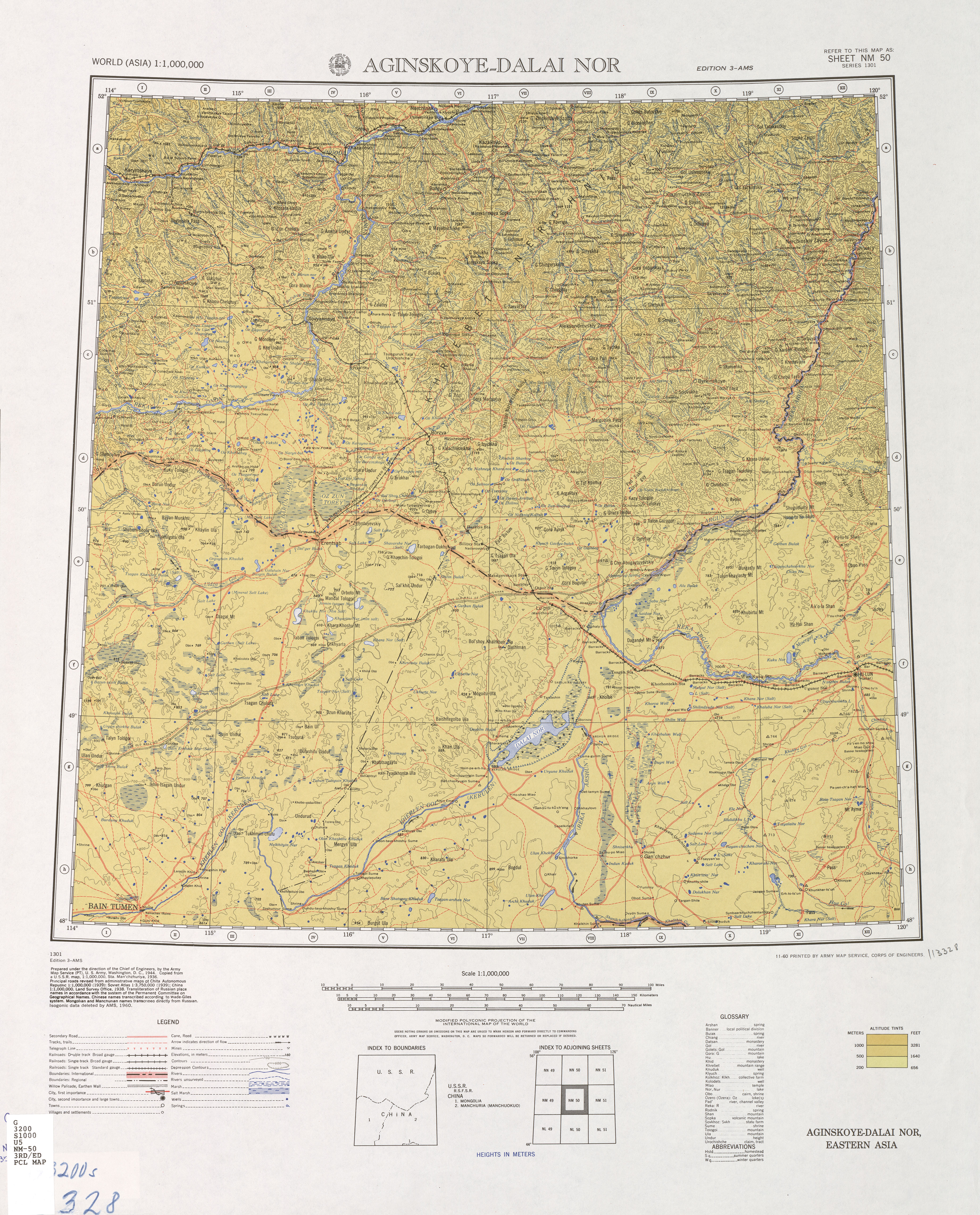

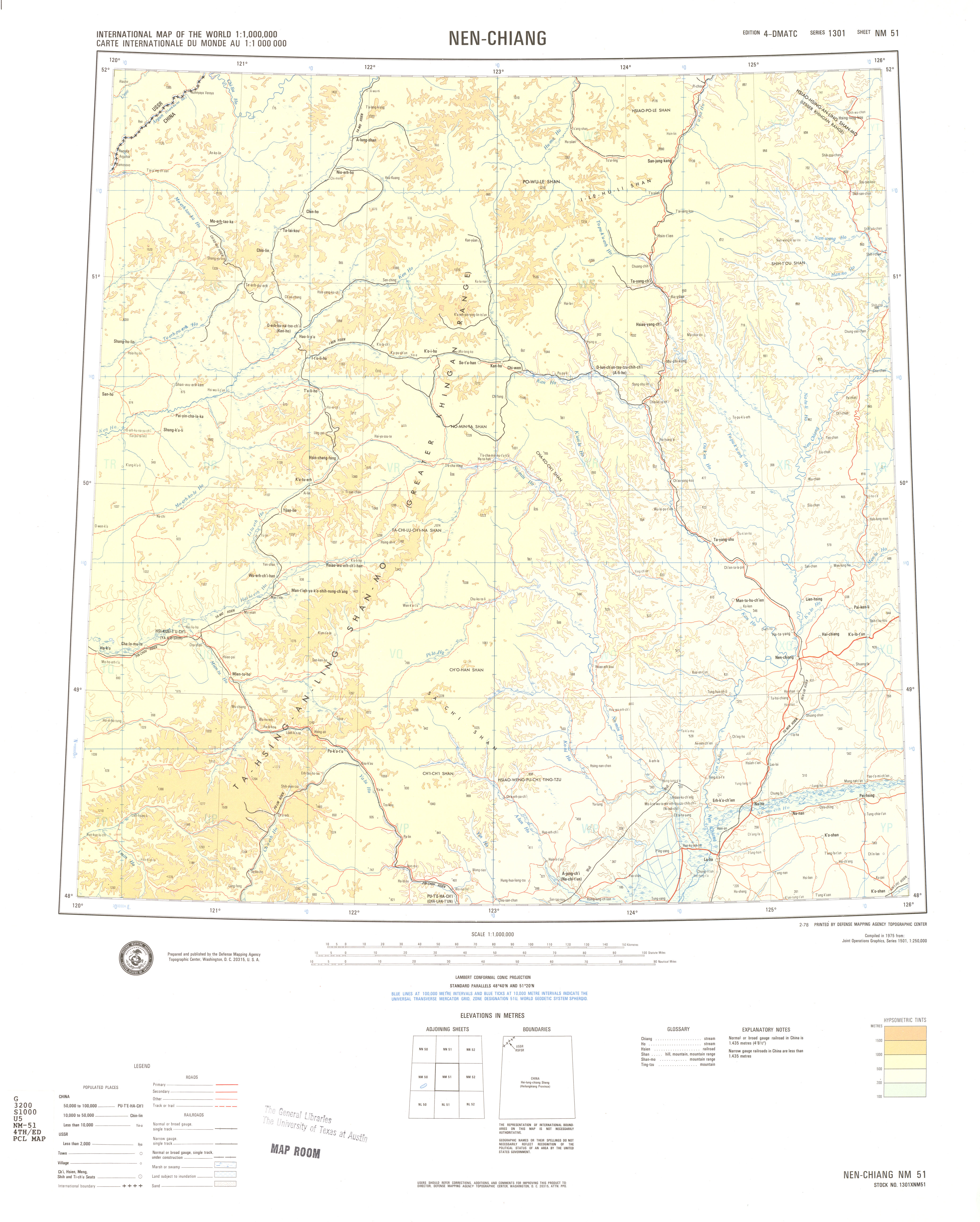

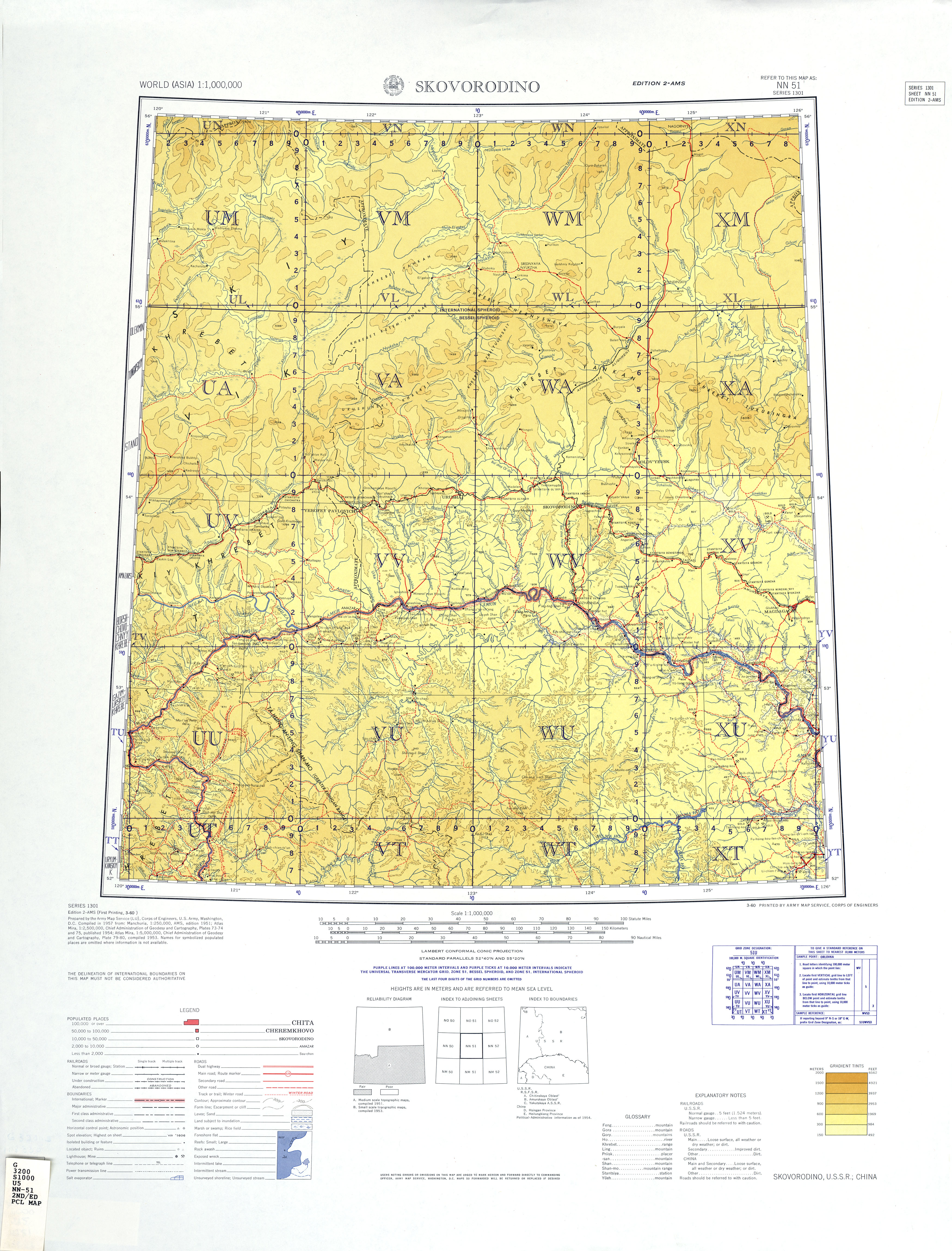

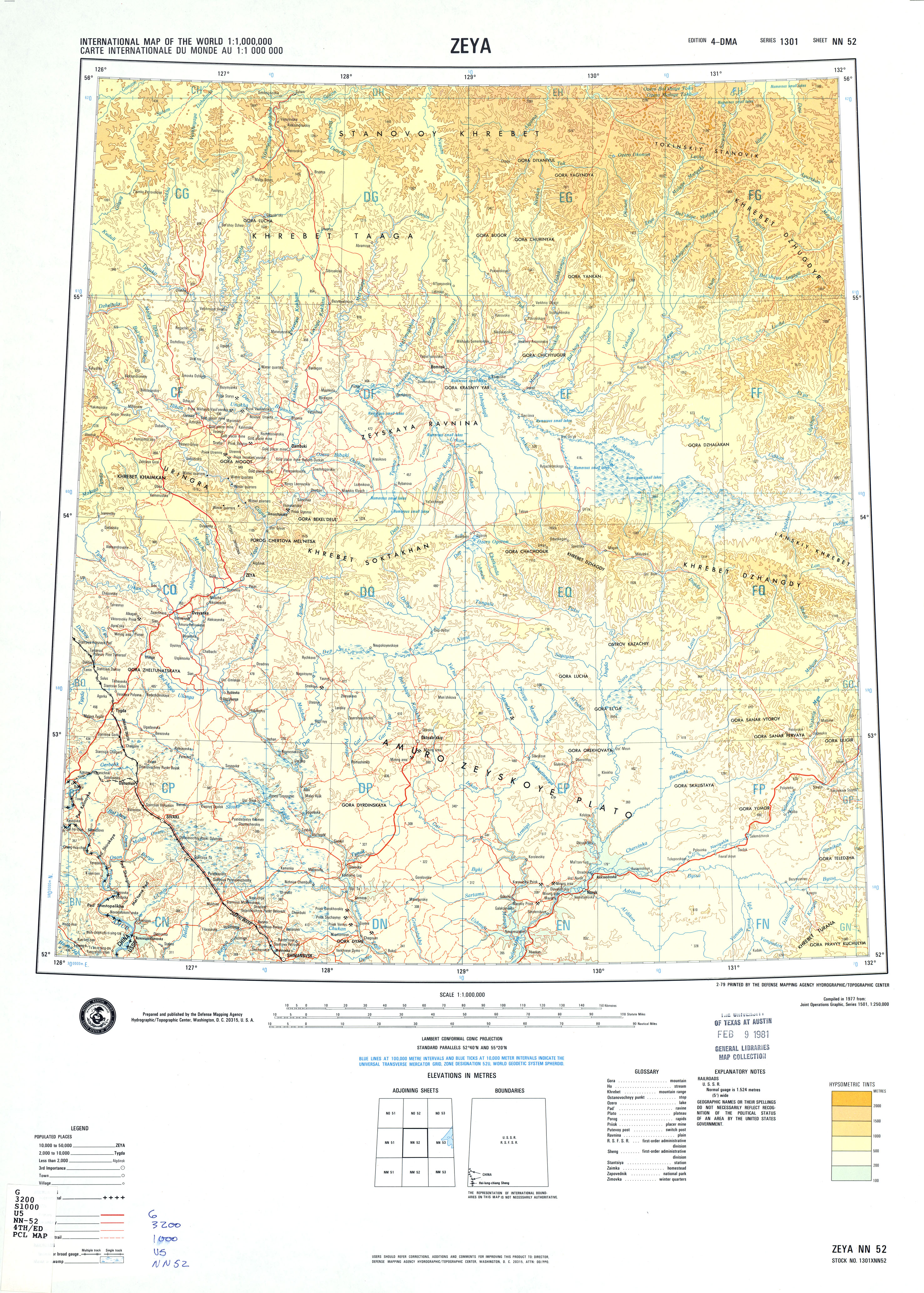

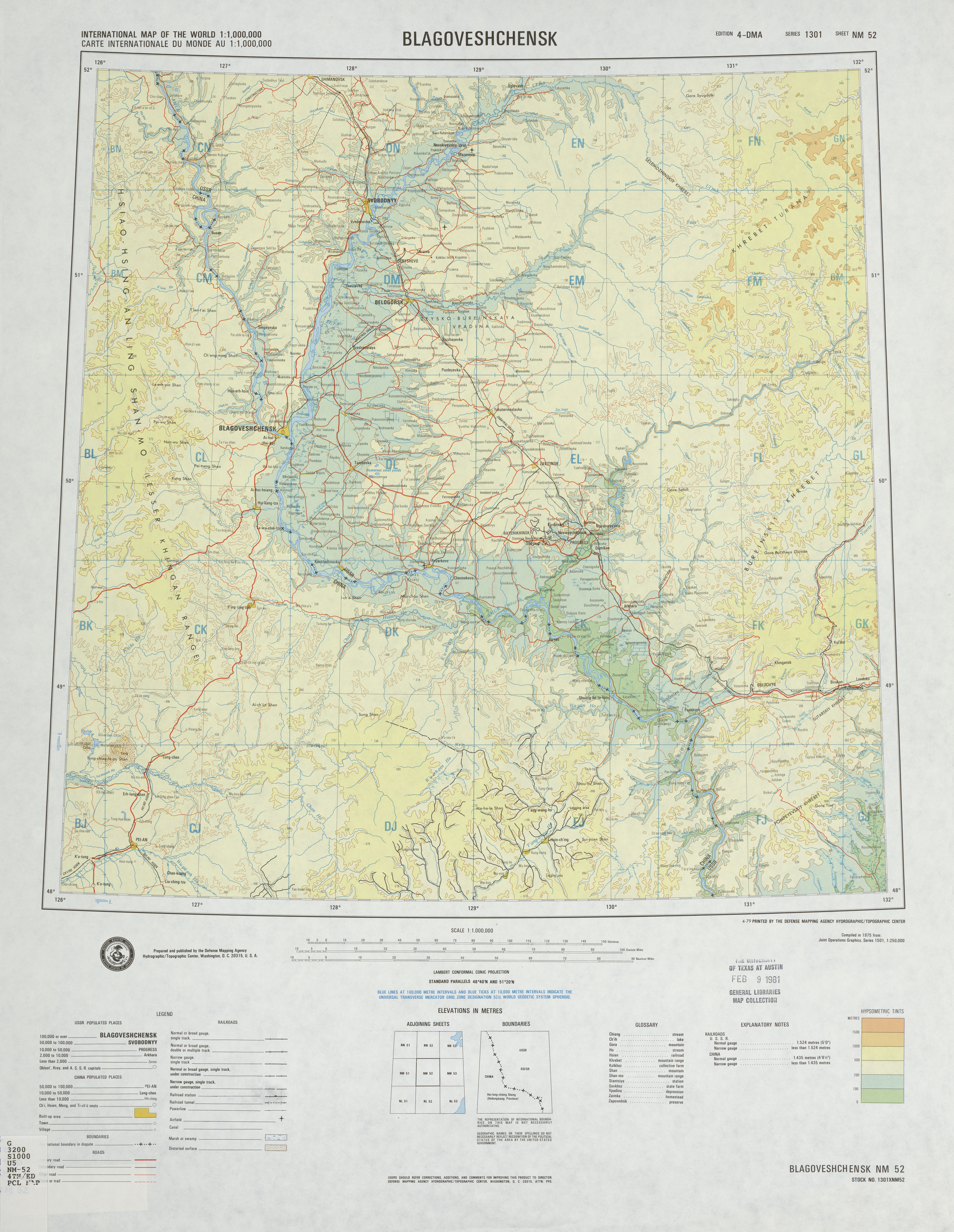

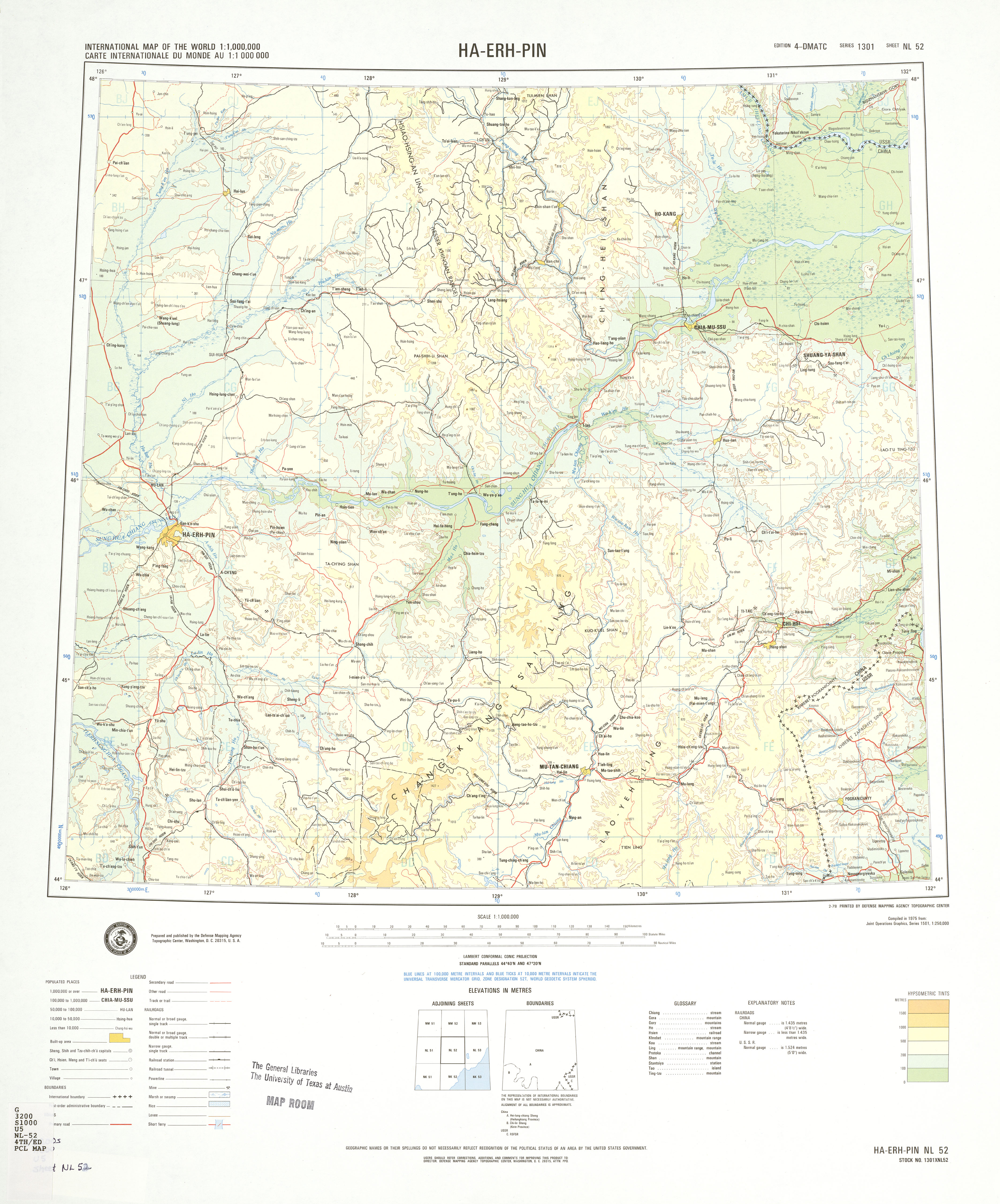

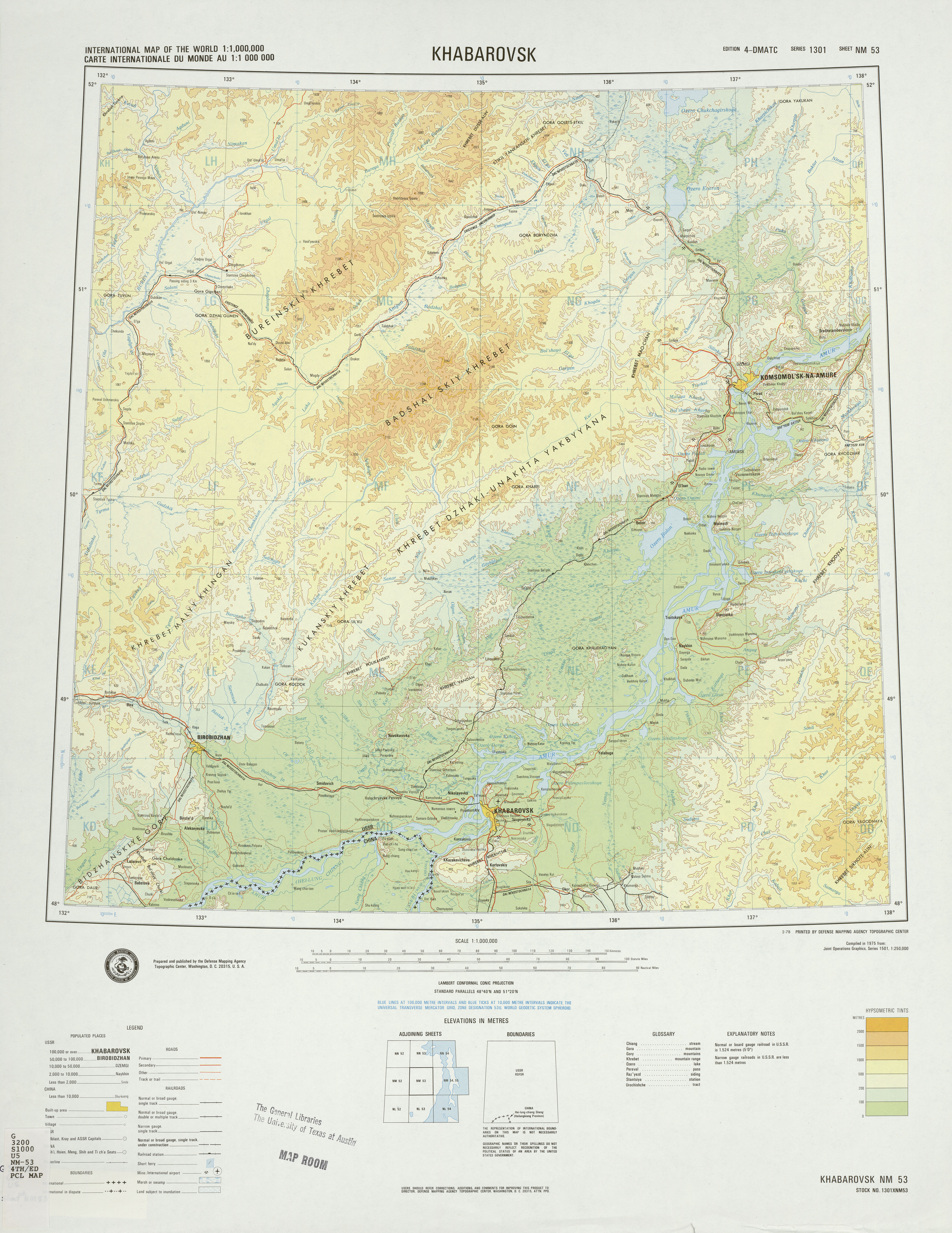

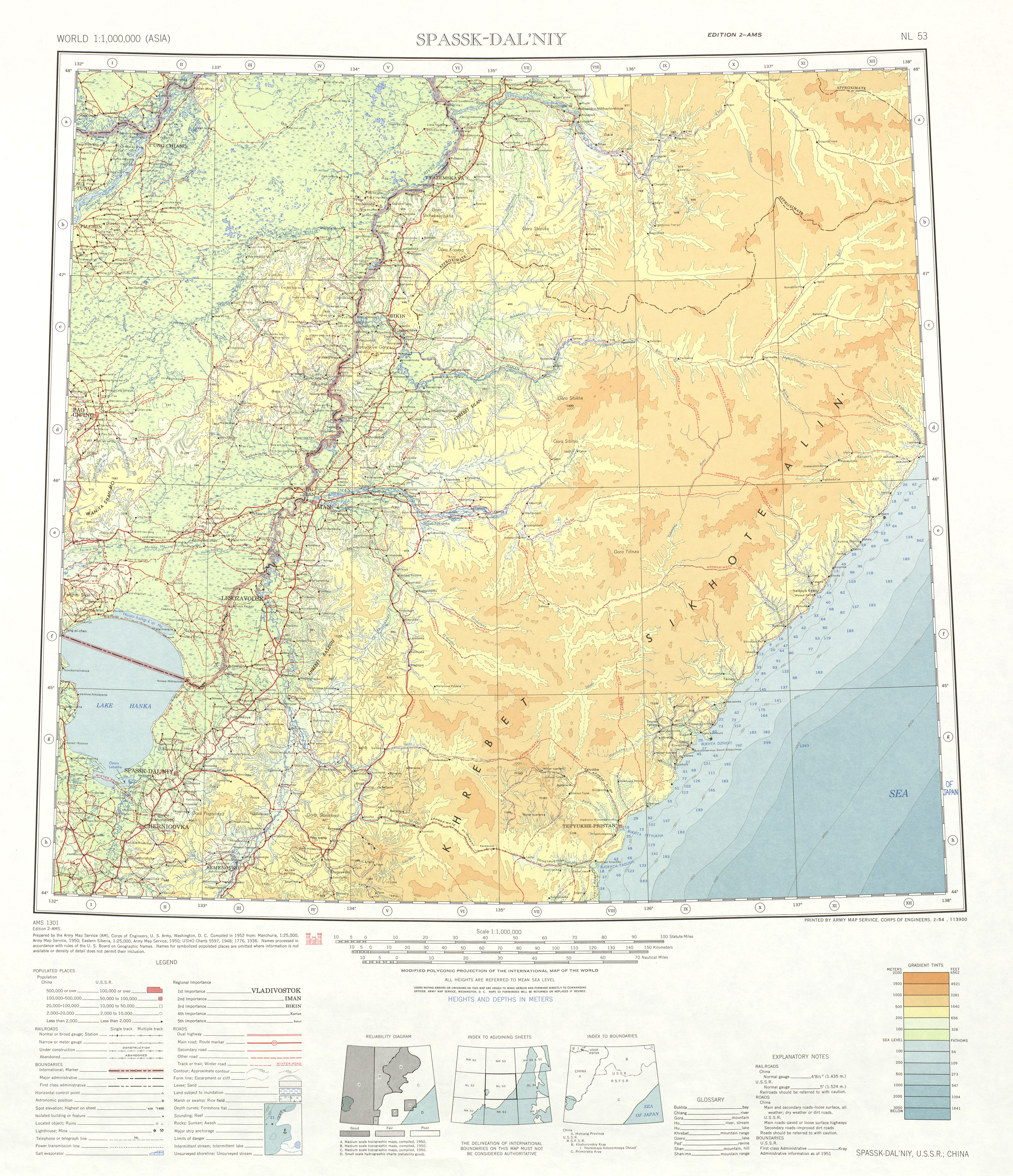

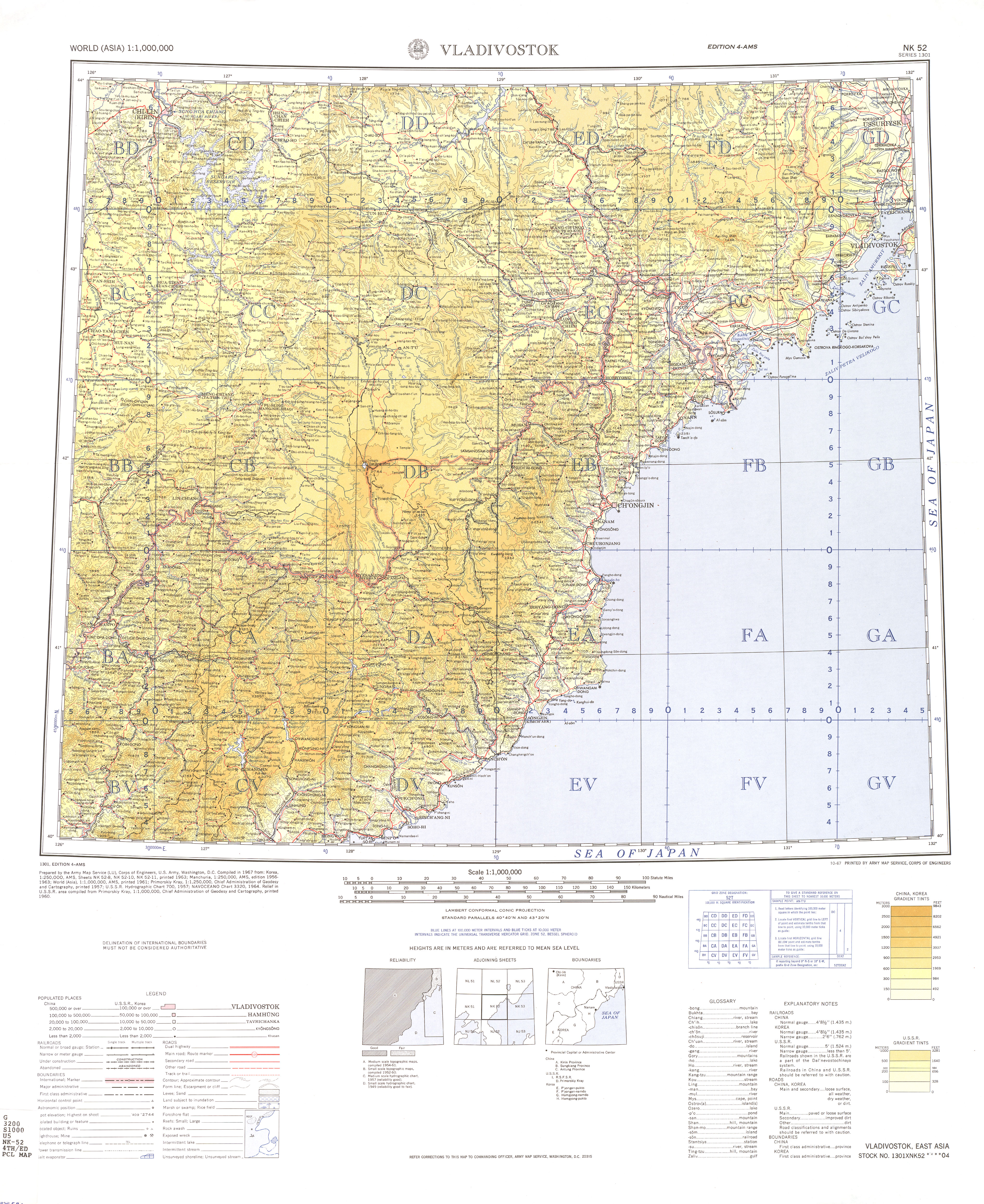

== See also ==
- History of Sino-Russian relations
- Sino-Russian relations since 1991
