= Krasny Velikan =

Krasny Velikan Красный Великан
- Settlement
- Location within Zabaykalsky Krai Location within Russia
- Coordinates: 50°04′N 117°03′E
- Country: Russia
- Region: Zabaykalsky Krai
- District: Zabaykalsky District
- Time zone: UTC+9:00

Krasny Velikan (Russian: Красный Великан) is a rural locality (a settlement) in Zabaykalsky District, Zabaykalsky Krai, Russia. Population: 282 (2021 census); 510 (2010 census); 671 (2002 census); There are 13 streets in this settlement.

== History ==
In 2014, 14 people died as a result of methanol poisoning via illegally imported alcohol.

== Geography ==
This rural locality is located 51 km from Zabaykalsk (the district's administrative centre), 335 km from Chita (capital of Zabaykalsky Krai) and 5,704 km from Moscow. Arabatuk is the nearest rural locality.
