= Kharanor =

Kharanor Харанор
- Settlement
- Location within Zabaykalsky Krai Location within Russia
- Coordinates: 50°06′N 116°40′E
- Country: Russia
- Region: Zabaykalsky Krai
- District: Zabaykalsky District
- Time zone: UTC+9:00

Kharanor (Russian: Харанор) is a rural locality (a settlement) in Zabaykalsky District, Zabaykalsky Krai, Russia. Population: 671 (2021 census); 1,079 (2010 census); There are 14 streets in this settlement.

== Geography ==
This rural locality is located 67 km from Zabaykalsk (the district's administrative centre), 313 km from Chita (capital of Zabaykalsky Krai) and 5,675 km from Moscow. Semiozyorye is the nearest rural locality.
