= Abagaytuy =

Abagaytuy Абагайтуй
- Selo
- Location within Zabaykalsky Krai Location within Russia
- Coordinates: 49.585278°N 117.833056°E
- Country: Russia
- Region: Zabaykalsky Krai
- District: Zabaykalsky District
- Time zone: UTC+9:00

Abagaytuy (Russian: Абагайтуй) is a rural locality (a selo) in Abagaytuyskoye Rural Settlement of Zabaykalsky District, Russia. The population was 510 as of 2017.

== Geography ==
Abagaytuy is located on the left bank of the Argun River, 45 km east of Zabaykalsk (the district's administrative centre) by road. Rudnik Abagaytuy is the nearest rural locality.

== History ==
Abagaytuy was founded in 1728.
