= Arabatuk, Zabaykalsky Krai =

Arabatuk Арабатук
- Selo
- Location within Zabaykalsky Krai Location within Russia
- Coordinates: 50°09′N 117°04′E
- Country: Russia
- Region: Zabaykalsky Krai
- District: Zabaykalsky District
- Time zone: UTC+9:00

Arabatuk (Russian: Арабатук) is a rural locality (a selo) in Zabaykalsky District, Zabaykalsky Krai, Russia. Population: 103 (2021 census); 145 (2010 census); There is 1 street in this selo.

== Geography ==
This rural locality is located 59 km from Zabaykalsk (the district's administrative centre), 329 km from Chita (capital of Zabaykalsky Krai) and 5,694 km from Moscow. Krasny Velikan is the nearest rural locality.
