= Semiozyorye =

Semiozyorye Семиозёрье
- Settlement
- Location within Zabaykalsky Krai Location within Russia
- Coordinates: 50°02′N 116°53′E
- Country: Russia
- Region: Zabaykalsky Krai
- District: Zabaykalsky District
- Time zone: UTC+9:00

Semiozyorye (Russian: Семиозёрье) is a rural locality (a settlement) in Zabaykalsky District, Zabaykalsky Krai, Russia. Population: 15 (2021 census); 45 (2010 census); There are 2 streets in this settlement.

== Geography ==
This rural locality is located 53 km from Zabaykalsk (the district's administrative centre), 329 km from Chita (capital of Zabaykalsky Krai) and 5,697 km from Moscow. Dauriya is the nearest rural locality.
