= Ushakovo, Amur Oblast =

Ushakovo Ушаково
- Selo
- Location within Amur Oblast Location within Russia
- Coordinates: 51°52′N 126°33′E
- Country: Russia
- Region: Amur Oblast
- District: Shimanovsky District
- Time zone: UTC+9:00

Ushakovo (Russian: Ушаково) is a rural locality (a selo) and the administrative center of Ushakovsky Selsoviet of Shimanovsky District, Amur Oblast, Russia. The population was 475 as of 2018. There are 12 streets.

== Geography ==
Ushakovo is located on the Amur River, 112 km west of Shimanovsk (the district's administrative centre) by road. Novovoskresenovka is the nearest rural locality.
