= China National Highway 331 =

Highway in China across the northern border

National Highway 331
- 331国道

Route information
- Length: 9,200 km (5,700 mi)

Major junctions
- From: Dandong, Liaoning
- To: Altay, Xinjiang

Location
- Country: China

Highway system
- National Trunk Highway System; Primary; Auxiliary
| ← G330 | → G332 |

China National Highway 331 (G331) runs along the northern Chinese border from Dandong, Liaoning to Altay, Xinjiang. Once fully completed it will be about 9,200 kilometres in length.

== Route and distance ==
Route and distance

| City | Distance (km) |
|---|---|
| Dandong, Liaoning | 0 |
| Sonid Left Banner | |
| Bayannur, Inner Mongolia | |
| Altay City | 9,200 |

== See also ==
- China National Highways
- China National Highway 219, running along the western and southern border
- China National Highway 228, which follows the coastline of China
