= K7023/7024 Harbin–Suifenhe through train =

Railway service in Heilongjiang, China

The K7023/7024 Harbin–Suifenhe through train (Chinese: K7023/7024次哈尔滨到绥芬河快速列车) is a Chinese railway running between Harbin to Suifenhe express passenger trains by the Harbin Railway Bureau, Harbin passenger segment responsible for passenger transport task, Habin originating on the Suifenhe train. 25G Type Passenger trains running along the Binsui Railway across Heilongjiang provinces, the entire 557 km. Harbin East Railway Station to Suifenhe Railway Station running 10 hours and 5 minutes, use trips for K7023; Suifenhe Railway Station to Harbin Railway Station to run 9 hours and 24 minutes, use trips for K7024.
