= China National Highway 501 =

Road in China

National Highway 501
- 501国道

Major junctions
- From: G221 Jixian
- To: Russian border at Dangbi

Location
- Country: China

Highway system
- National Trunk Highway System; Primary; Auxiliary
← G361	→ G502

China National Highway 501 will run from Jixian in Heilongjiang to Dangbi on the border with Russia at Lake Khanka, also in Heilongjiang. It is one of the new trunk highways proposed in the China National Highway Network Planning (2013–2030).

== Status ==
Between Shuangyashan and Baoqing County, the highway is under construction as a four-lane road, partially following a new route, part of it superseding County Road 132 and Provincial Highway 205. This section is expected to open in June 2020. Between Baoqing and Mishan, it will be upgraded provincial highway 205.
