= Manzhouli =

Sub-prefectural city in Inner Mongolia, China

Manzhouli 满洲里市 · ᠮᠠᠨᠵᠤᠤᠷ ᠬᠣᠲᠠ · Маньчжурия
- County-level and sub-prefectural city
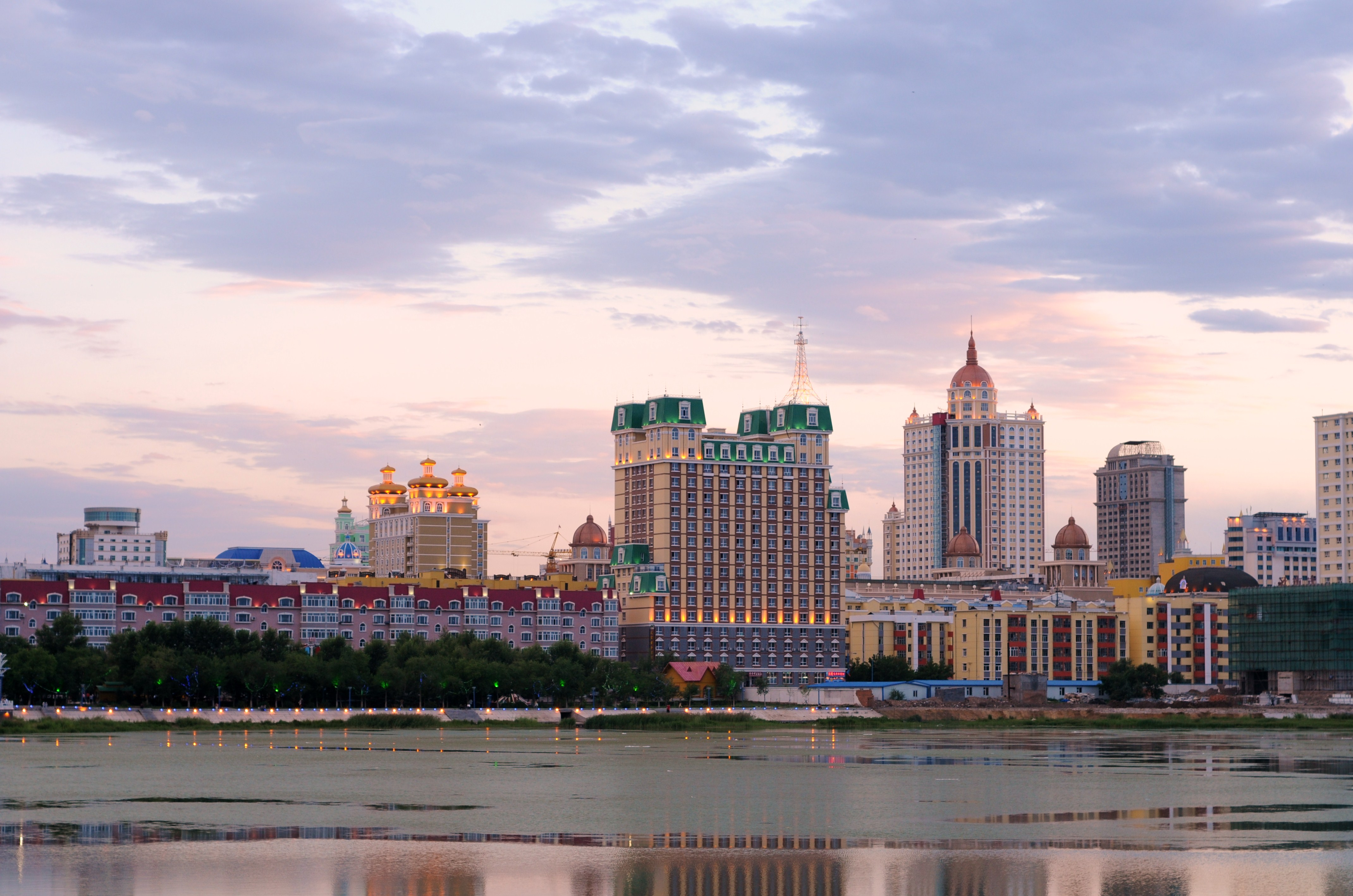
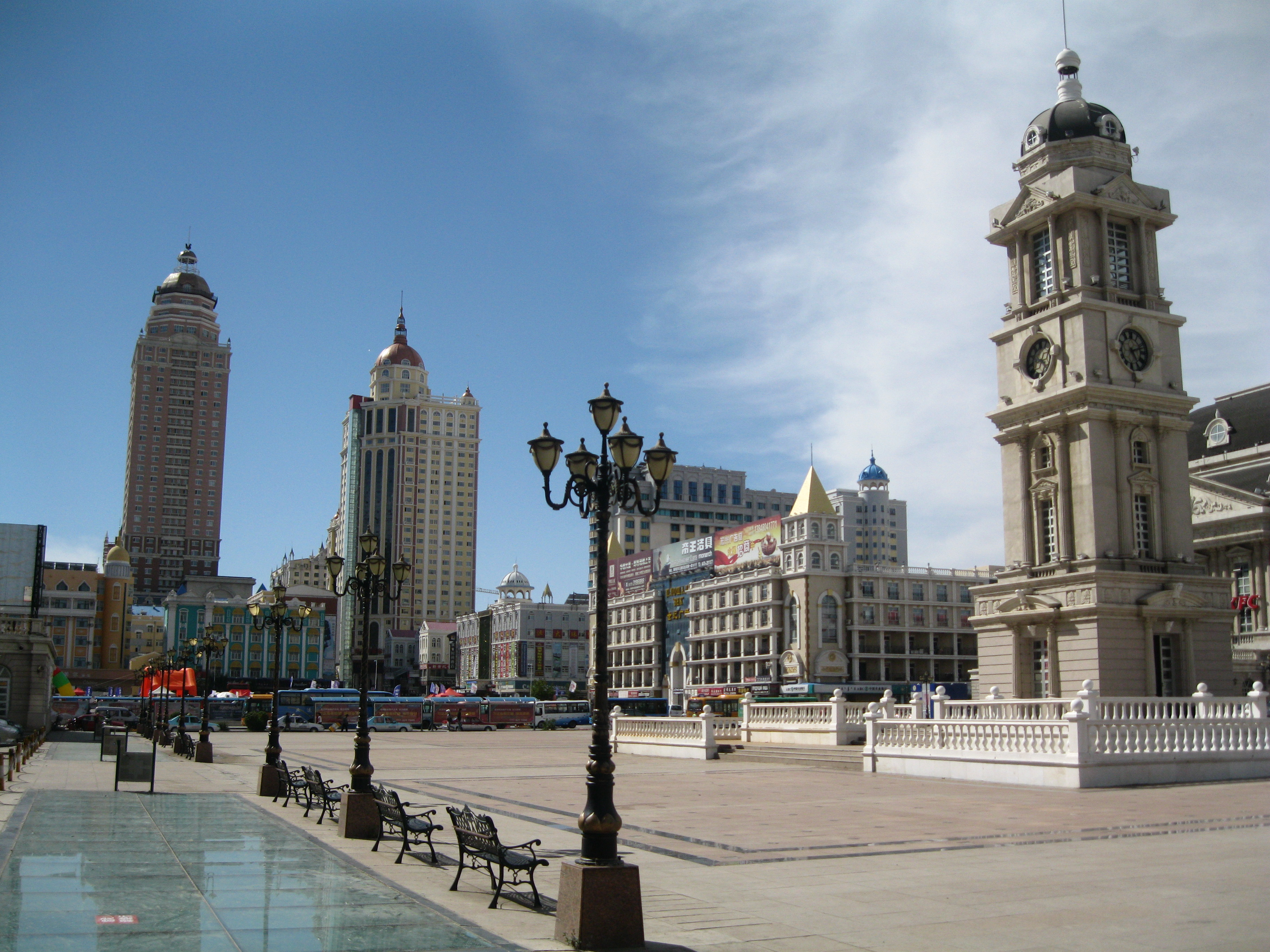
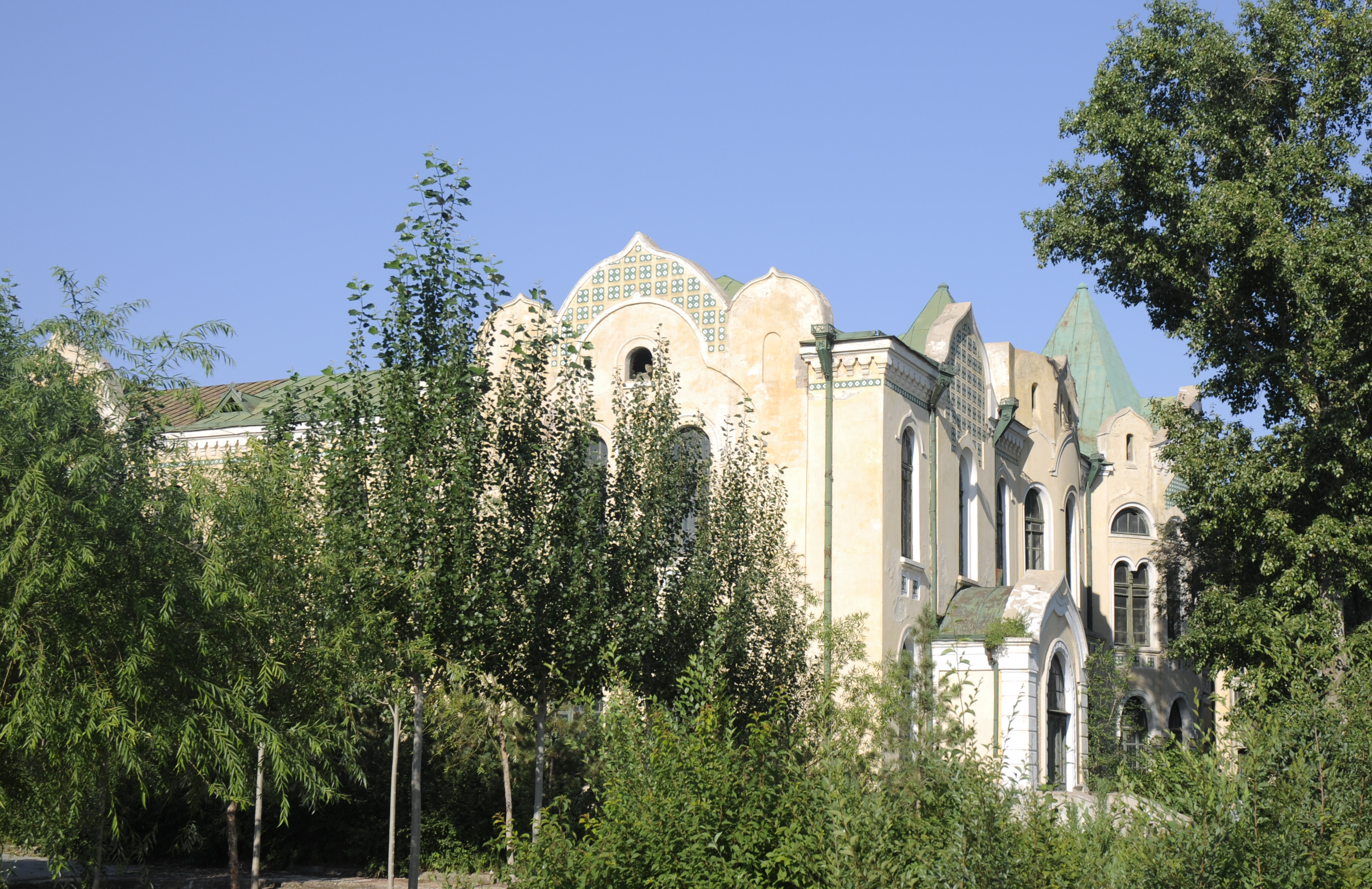
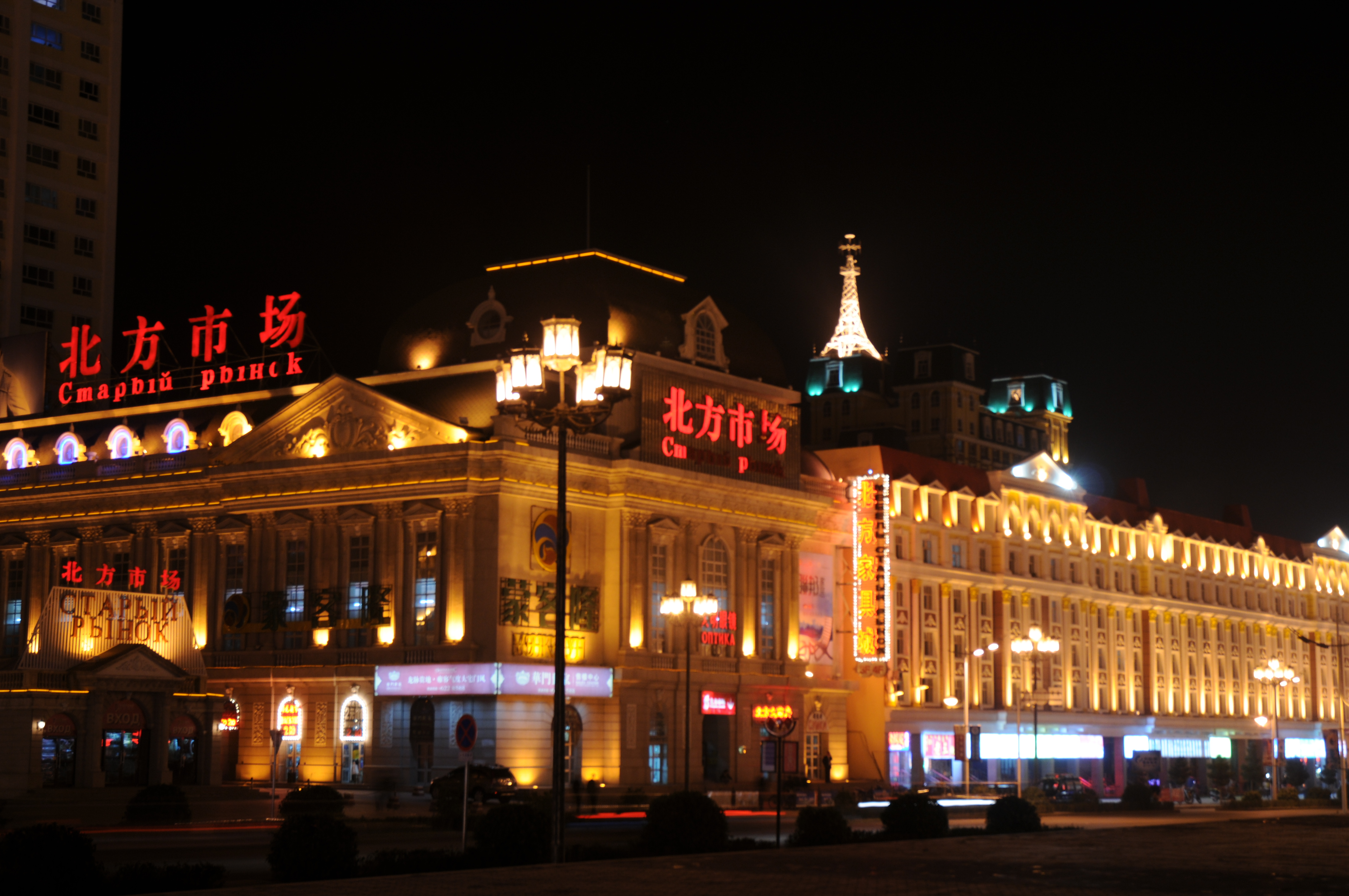
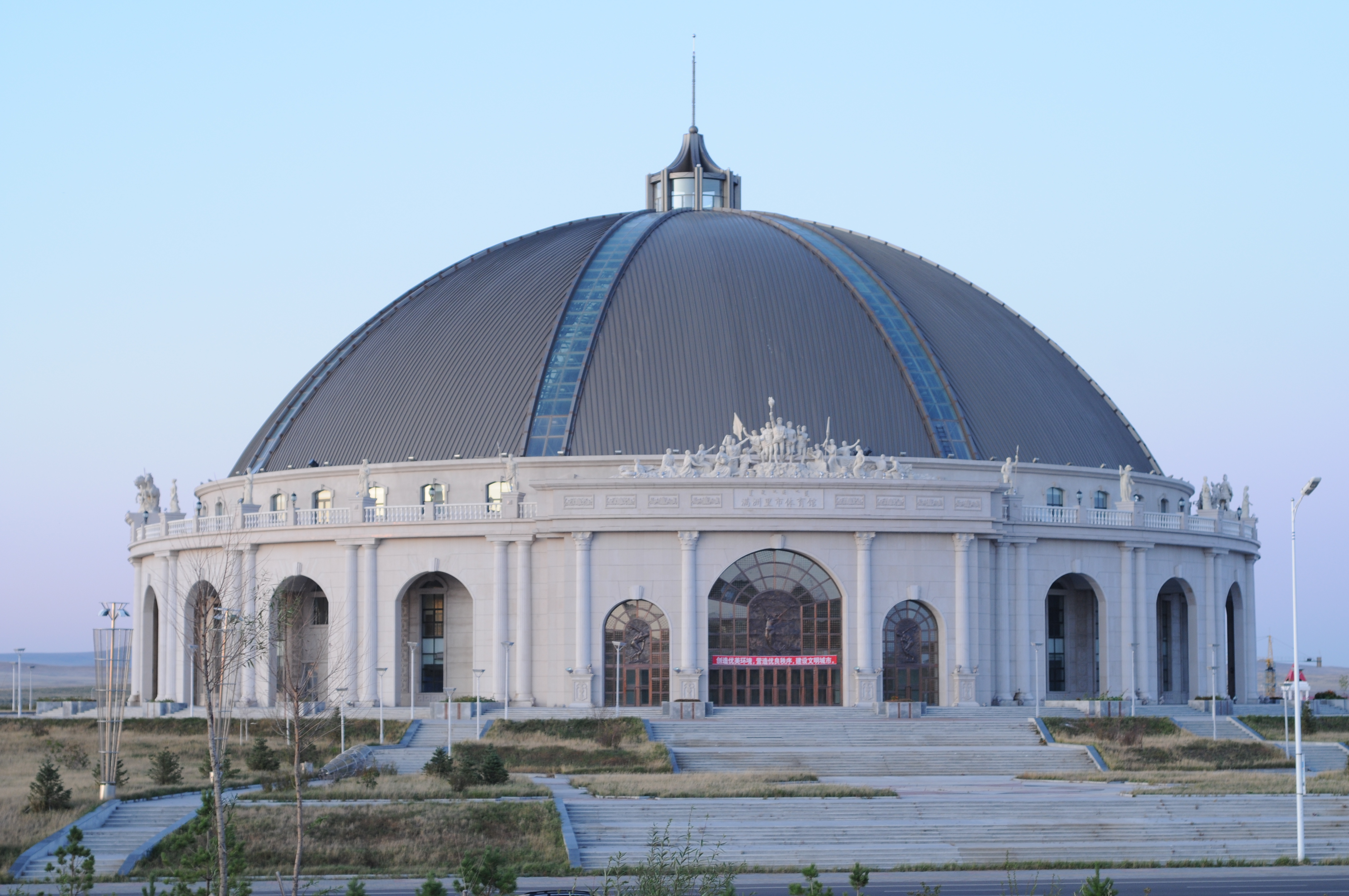
- Clockwise from top: City center, Manzhouli Museum, Manzhouli Stadium, Beifang Market, Shiji Square

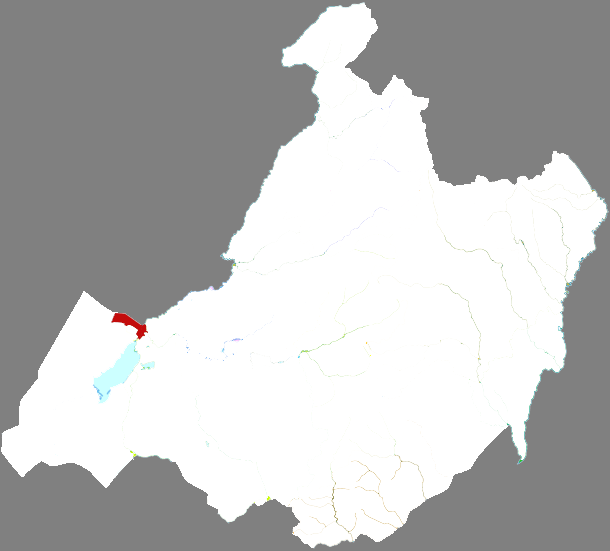
- Manzhouli in Hulunbuir

- Location in Inner Mongolia Manzhouli (China)
- Coordinates: 49°35′53″N 117°22′44″E
- Country: China
- Autonomous region: Inner Mongolia
- Prefecture-level city: Hulunbuir
- Municipal seat: Dongshan Subdistrict

Area
  - Total: 732.4 km^{2} (282.8 sq mi)

Population (2020)
  - Total: 150,508
  - Density: 205.5/km^{2} (532.2/sq mi)
- Time zone: UTC+8 (China Standard)
- Postal code: 021400
- Area code: 0470
- Website: www.manzhouli.gov.cn

Manzhouli

Chinese name
- Traditional Chinese: 滿洲里
- Simplified Chinese: 满洲里
- Postal: Manchouli
Transcriptions
Standard Mandarin
- Hanyu Pinyin: Mǎnzhōulǐ
- Wade–Giles: Man^{3}-chou^{1}-li^{3}

Mongolian name
- Mongolian Cyrillic: Манжуур хот
- Mongolian script: ᠮᠠᠨᠵᠤᠤᠷ ᠬᠣᠲᠠ
Transcriptions
- SASM/GNC: Manjuur qota

Russian name
- Russian: Маньчжурия

Manzhouli (Chinese: 满洲里; Mongolian: Манжуур хот; ᠮᠠᠨᠵᠤᠤᠷ ᠬᠣᠲᠠ; Russian: Маньчжурия) is a sub-prefectural city in the Hulunbuir prefecture-level city jurisdiction, Inner Mongolia Autonomous Region, China. Located on the border with Russia and also not far from the country of Mongolia, Manzhouli is a major land port of entry. It has an area of 696.3 square kilometres (268.8 mi^{2}) and a population of almost 250,000 (in 2010).

== History ==
In ancient times, the area was inhabited by the Donghu, Xiongnu, Xianbei, Khitan, Jurchen, Mongols and Manchu. During the decline of China's last dynasty, the Russian Empire forced the Qing (1644–1912) to cede Outer Manchuria in the 1858 Treaty of Aigun. That treaty made the Argun River, which originates in the area, the border between China and Russia.

In 1901, the China Far East Railway was completed in accordance with the Sino-Russian Secret Treaty of 1896, linking Siberia, Manchuria/northeast China, and the Russian Far East. A settlement then formed around Manchzhuriya Station, the first stop within Manchuria for Russians. It was the beginning of the modern city of Manzhouli and the name of Manzhouli came from Russian Манжули (Manzhuli).

In 1905, Manzhouli was designated a trading center, greatly boosting Manzhouli's growth. In 1908, the Manzhouli customs post was set up. Under the Republic of China, Manzhouli (under the name Lubin [臚濱; Lúbīn; Lu^{2}-pin^{1}]) came under the jurisdiction of the province of Hsingan. In 1927, Manzhouli was designated as a city. In 1931, Manzhouli came under Japanese control and, with Hsingan and surrounding areas, became part of Manchukuo, a Japanese puppet state from 1932 to 1945. With the defeat of Japan at the end of World War II, the Chinese government made Manzhouli part of Inner Mongolia in 1946.

In 1992, Manzhouli became one of the first land border cities opened up by the People's Republic of China. It has since experienced a boom as a conduit for the increasing trade between China and Russia. It became even more important with the surge in cross-border trade to help ease the effect of Western sanctions on Russia following its invasion of Ukraine.

In 2017, the Manzhouli Stadium opened. The football stadium has a capacity of 20,153.

== Geography and climate ==
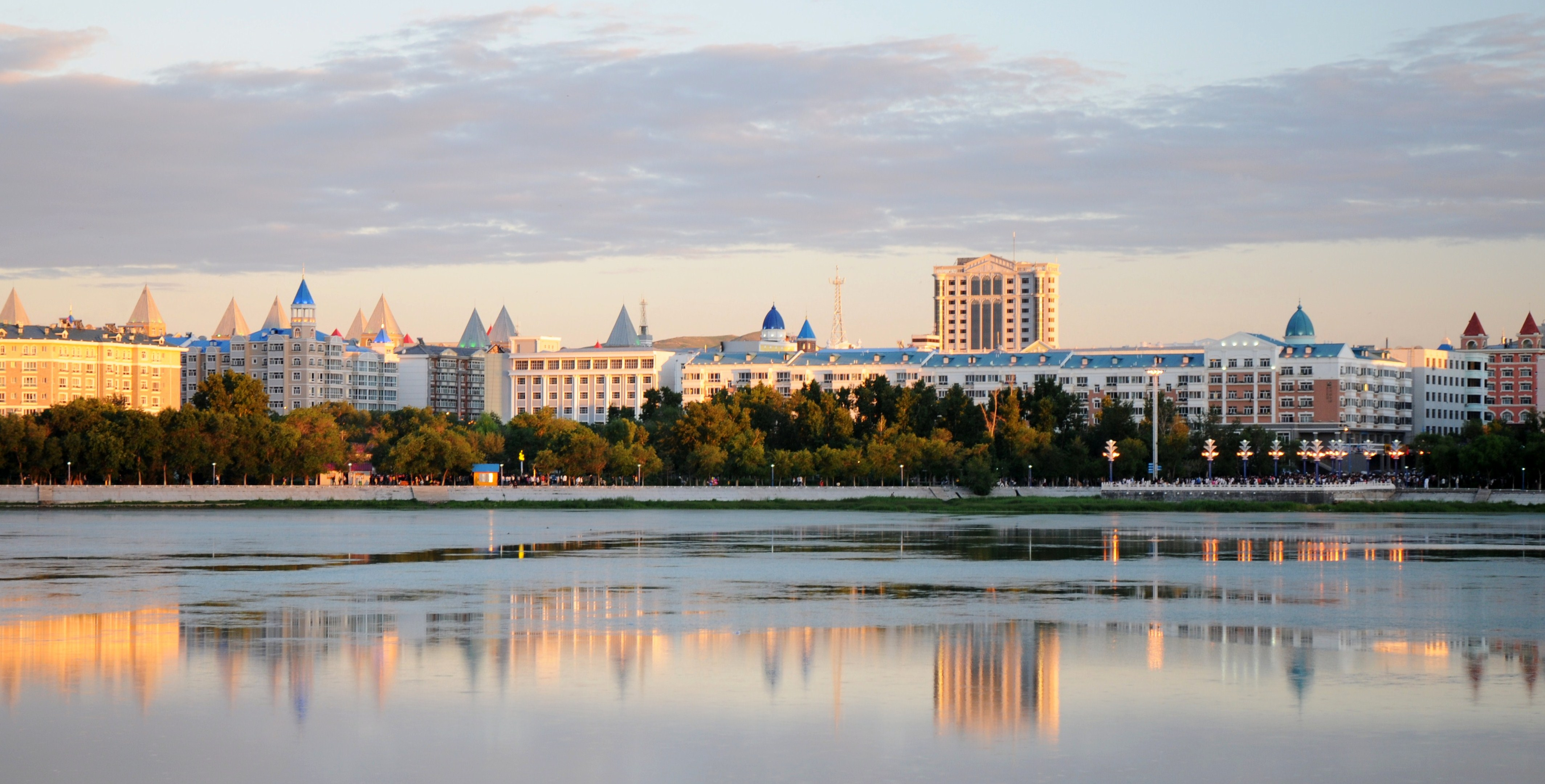
Downtown Manzhouli

Manzhouli is located in the western part of the Hulunbuir prefecture-level city. To the east, south and west it borders New Barag Left Banner and New Barag Right Banner, also in Hulunbuir, and Russia to the north, with which it shares a border 54 kilometres (34 mi) long. The Russian townlet of Zabaykalsk is situated immediately north of Abagaitu Islet and Manzhouli.

Manzhouli is located on the Hulunbuir grasslands. Lake Hulun to its immediate south is the PRC's fifth largest freshwater lake with an area of 2,600 square kilometers (1,000 mi^{2}) and an average depth of just 5 meters (16 ft).

Manzhouli has a semi-arid climate (Köppen (BSk), with temperatures in winter capable of plummeting below −40 °C (−40 °F). However, in each month there is more than 55% of possible sunshine, and over three-fourths of annual precipitation occurs from June to August.

Climate data for Manzhouli, elevation 662 m (2,172 ft), (1991–2020 normals, extremes 1971–present)
Month	Jan	Feb	Mar	Apr	May	Jun	Jul	Aug	Sep	Oct	Nov	Dec	Year
Record high °C (°F)	−0.6 (30.9)	8.1 (46.6)	18.4 (65.1)	30.0 (86.0)	34.3 (93.7)	40.2 (104.4)	40.5 (104.9)	36.6 (97.9)	34.0 (93.2)	25.6 (78.1)	11.5 (52.7)	1.2 (34.2)	40.5 (104.9)
Mean daily maximum °C (°F)	−17.4 (0.7)	−11.3 (11.7)	−1.6 (29.1)	10.2 (50.4)	19.0 (66.2)	25.2 (77.4)	27.2 (81.0)	24.8 (76.6)	18.1 (64.6)	7.9 (46.2)	−5.3 (22.5)	−15.3 (4.5)	6.8 (44.2)
Daily mean °C (°F)	−23.5 (−10.3)	−18.7 (−1.7)	−9.0 (15.8)	2.9 (37.2)	11.8 (53.2)	18.6 (65.5)	20.9 (69.6)	18.3 (64.9)	10.6 (51.1)	0.5 (32.9)	−11.9 (10.6)	−20.9 (−5.6)	0.0 (31.9)
Mean daily minimum °C (°F)	−28.4 (−19.1)	−24.6 (−12.3)	−15.8 (3.6)	−4.6 (23.7)	3.7 (38.7)	11.0 (51.8)	14.5 (58.1)	11.9 (53.4)	3.8 (38.8)	−5.7 (21.7)	−17.3 (0.9)	−25.8 (−14.4)	−6.4 (20.4)
Record low °C (°F)	−43.8 (−46.8)	−42.5 (−44.5)	−34.0 (−29.2)	−21.6 (−6.9)	−11.6 (11.1)	−2.4 (27.7)	2.5 (36.5)	0.8 (33.4)	−9.5 (14.9)	−23.8 (−10.8)	−35.1 (−31.2)	−39.4 (−38.9)	−43.8 (−46.8)
Average precipitation mm (inches)	1.7 (0.07)	1.3 (0.05)	3.5 (0.14)	6.3 (0.25)	20.6 (0.81)	48.1 (1.89)	77.8 (3.06)	58.2 (2.29)	26.7 (1.05)	8.9 (0.35)	2.8 (0.11)	2.4 (0.09)	258.3 (10.16)
Average precipitation days (≥ 0.1 mm)	3.6	1.9	2.7	4.0	6.9	10.2	13.4	11.2	7.4	4.6	3.9	4.4	74.2
Average snowy days	8.3	5.6	6.2	5.0	0.9	0.1	0	0	0.6	4.6	8.6	9.8	49.7
Average relative humidity (%)	71	68	59	43	41	53	64	66	61	59	68	73	61
Mean monthly sunshine hours	200.3	228.4	287.4	286.5	310.7	299.8	287.0	278.5	255.2	234.4	189.6	168.8	3,026.6
Percentage possible sunshine	74	79	77	69	65	62	59	63	69	72	71	67	69
Source 1: China Meteorological Administration all-time extreme temperature
Source 2: Weather China

== Administration ==
Manzhouli is divided into five subdistricts and one town.

Name	Simplified Chinese	Hanyu Pinyin	Mongolian (Hudum Script)	Mongolian (Cyrillic)	Administrative division code
Subdistricts
Dongshan Subdistrict	东山街道	Dōngshān Jiēdào	ᠳ᠋ᠦᠩ ᠱᠠᠨ ᠵᠡᠭᠡᠯᠢ ᠭᠤᠳᠤᠮᠵᠢ	Лин чиован балгас	150621001
Nanqu Subdistrict	南区街道	Nánqū Jiēdào	ᠡᠮᠦᠨ᠎ᠡ ᠲᠣᠭᠣᠷᠢᠭ ᠤᠨ ᠵᠡᠭᠡᠯᠢ ᠭᠤᠳᠤᠮᠵᠢ	Өмнө дугаргийн зээл гудамж	150621002
Beiqu Subdistrict	北区街道	Běiqū Jiēdào	ᠤᠮᠠᠷᠠᠲᠤ ᠲᠣᠭᠣᠷᠢᠭ	Умард дугараг	150621003
Xinghua Subdistrict	兴华街道	Xīnghuá Jiēdào	ᠰᠢᠩ ᠬᠤᠸᠠ ᠵᠡᠭᠡᠯᠢ ᠭᠤᠳᠤᠮᠵᠢ	Шин ухаа зээл гудамж	150621004
Orjin Subdistrict	敖尔金街道	Áo'ěrjīn Jiēdào	ᠣᠷᠵᠢᠨ ᠵᠡᠭᠡᠯᠢ ᠭᠤᠳᠤᠮᠵᠢ	Оржин зээл гудамж	150781012
Town
Xinkaihe Town	新开河镇	Xīnkāihé Zhèn	ᠰᠢᠨ ᠺᠠᠢ ᠾᠧ ᠪᠠᠯᠭᠠᠰᠤ	Шин кай ге балгас	150781100

- Others:
  - Manzhouli Mutual Trade Zone (满洲里市互市贸易区)
  - Manzhouli Economic Cooperation Zone (满洲里市经济合作区)
  - Manzhouli Comprehensive Bonded Zone (满洲里综合保税区)

== Tourism ==
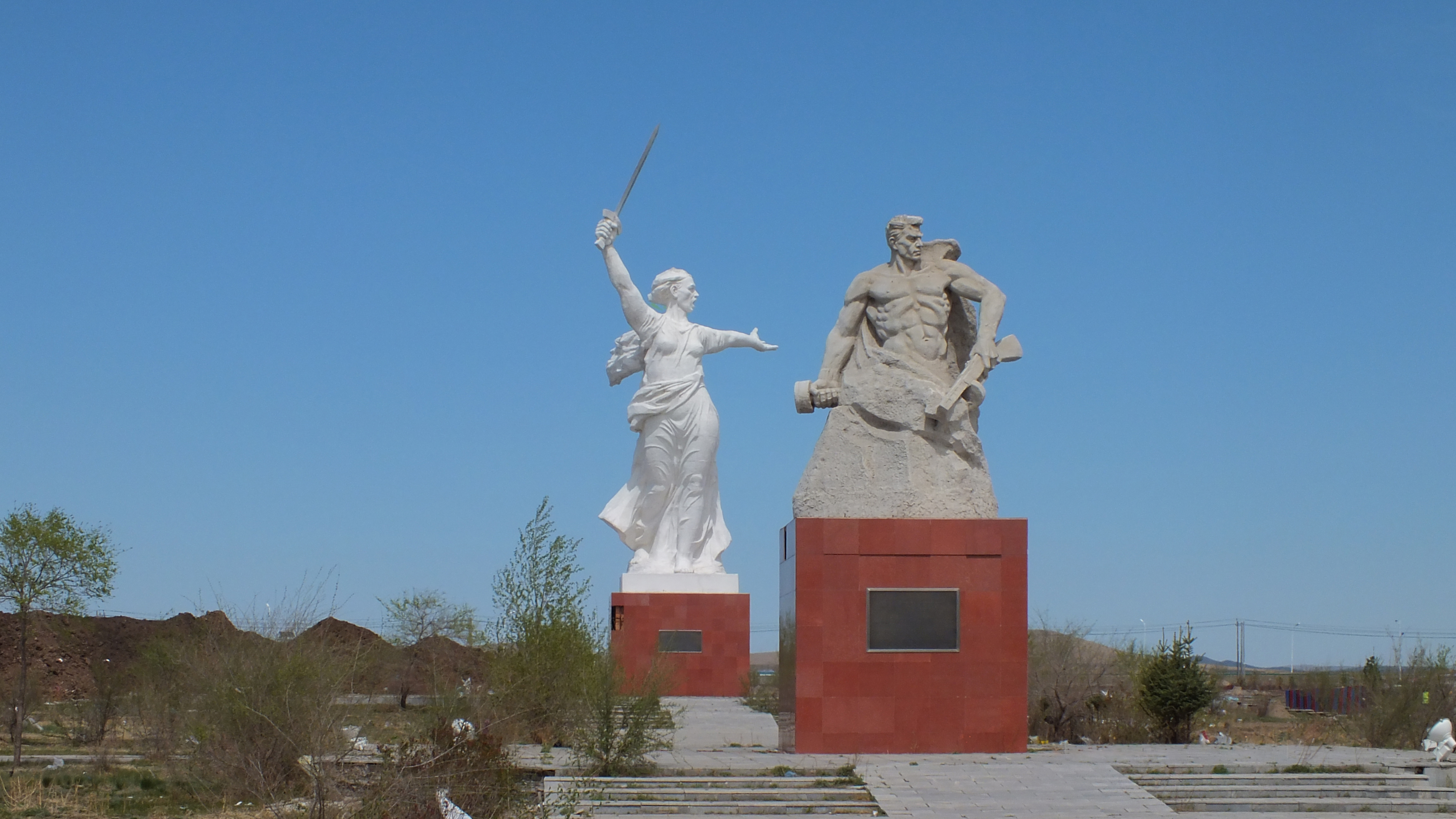
A replica of the Soviet monument The Motherland Calls

The border crossing with Russia is a tourist attraction. The Manzhouli China-Russia Border Tourist Area is a destination that brings together the border gate, a giant Matryoshka doll shaped hotel, and park filled with Matryoshka dolls. Other attractions within the scenic area are the No 41 Border Monument and the Locomotive Square. It has been rated as a AAAAA (5A) tourist attraction.

Manzhouli Ice & Snow Festival takes place every winter from some time in February to early March. This is a smaller version of the Harbin International Ice and Snow Sculpture Festival.

There is a replica of the Soviet World War II monument, The Motherland Calls.

== Economy ==
Manzhouli is China's busiest land port of entry, and is responsible for 60% of all imports from and exports to Eastern Europe.

=== Sino-Russian Border Trade Zone ===
Manzhouli hosts a "Sino-Russian Mutual Market Trade Zone," a designated area where Chinese and Russian citizens can engage in tax-free trade of goods up to a certain value. This zone is a key component of cross-border economic cooperation, facilitating the exchange of commodities and fostering people-to-people ties.

== Demographics ==
Historical population
Year	Pop.	±%
1990	137,000	—
2004	160,000	+16.8%
2007	163,441	+2.2%
2010	249,473	+52.6%
Population size may be affected by changes on administrative divisions.

Ninety-five percent of Manzhouli's population is Han Chinese. The remainder are Buryat, Russian, Mongol, Manchu, or of other ethnicities.

== Media ==
Much of the plot of the 2018 film An Elephant Sitting Still revolves around a number of characters traveling to a circus in Manzhouli.

== Transportation ==
=== Railway ===
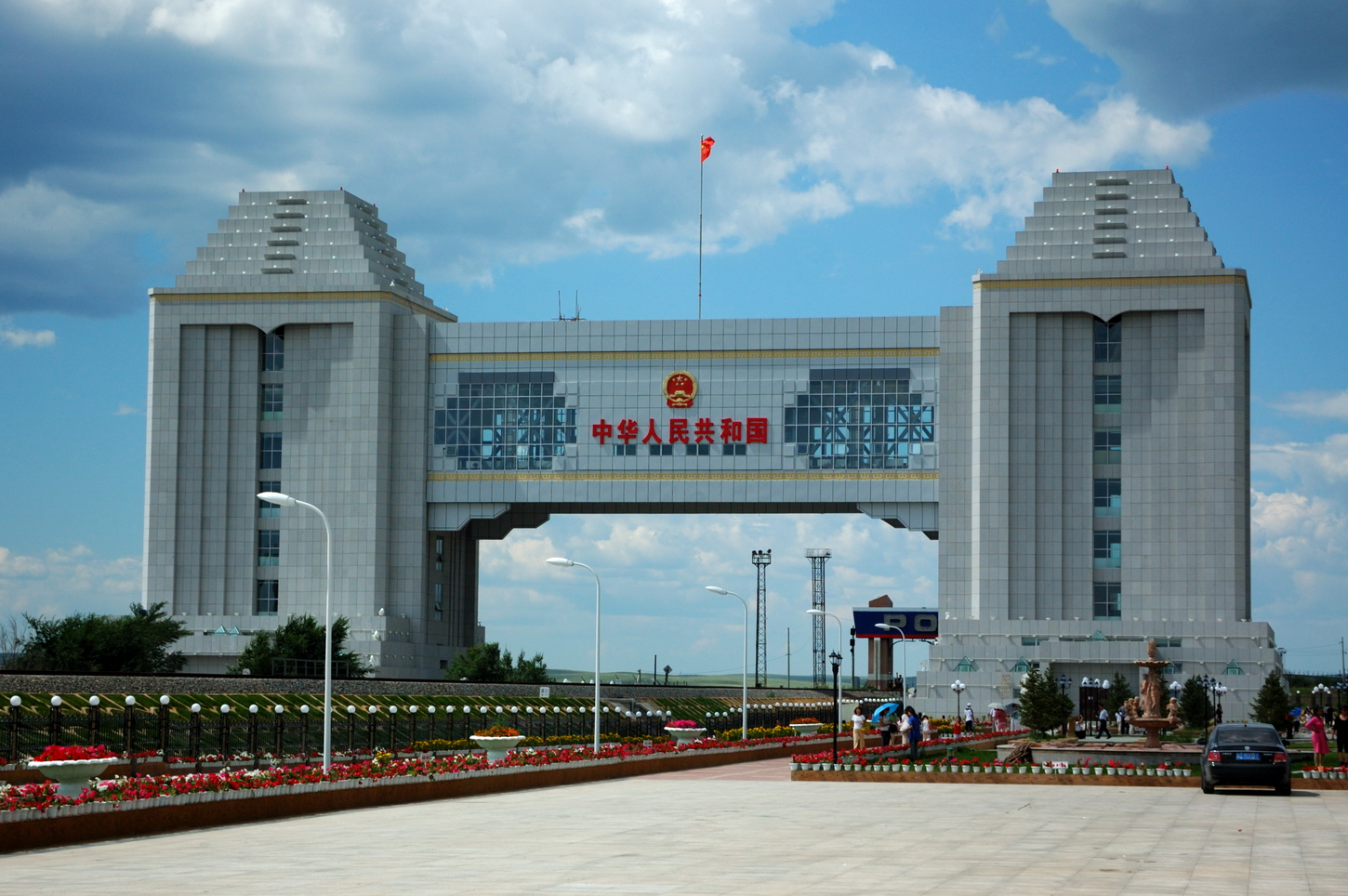
Railway border crossing at Manzhouli, 2008

The Chinese rail system, with a track gage of 1,435 mm (4 ft 8 1/2 in), meets the Russian rail system, with track gauge of 1,524 mm (5 ft), at Manzholi. That break of gauge means that trains cannot run through. To help cope with the problem in the face of increasing cross-border rail traffic, a break of gauge multi-modal transshipment facility was completed in 2008 on the Russian side of the border in Zabaikalsk.

Trains from Beijing to Moscow on the Trans-Manchurian branch of the Trans-Siberian Railway pass through Manzhouli Railway Station. There are also tourist lines to Chita, Krasnokamensk, Irkutsk, and Ulan Ude.

=== Air ===
Manzhouli Xijiao Airport is located in the western part of the city. Passengers can fly to Beijing and Inner Mongolia's capital city Hohhot from the airport as well as the Russian city of Chita and the Mongolian capital city Ulaanbaatar via Choibalsan.

=== Highway ===
- By China National Highway 301 linked to Inner Mongolia and Heilongjiang.

== Education ==
Secondary schools include:

- Manzhouli No. 7 (满洲里市第七中学)
- Manzhouli No. 8 School (满洲里市第八学校)
- Manzhouli No. 11 (满洲里市第十一中学)

== Sister cities ==
Manzhouli is twinned with the following sister cities.

- Chita, Zabaykalsky Krai, Russia
- Krasnokamensk, Zabaykalsky Krai, Russia
- Ulan-Ude, Buryatia, Russia
