= Zabaykalsk =

Zabaykalsk Забайкальск
- Urban-type settlement
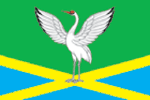
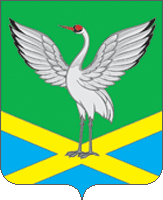
- Flag Coat of arms
- Interactive map of Zabaykalsk
- Location of Zabaykalsk Zabaykalsk (Zabaykalsky Krai)
- Coordinates: 49°39′05″N 117°19′37″E
- Country: Russia
- Federal subject: Zabaykalsky Krai
- Administrative district: Zabaykalsky District
- Otpor station: 1904
- Urban-type settlement status since: 1954
- Elevation: 680 m (2,230 ft)

Population (2010 Census)
  - Total: 11,769
  - Estimate (1 January 2018): 13,154 (+11.8%)

Administrative status
  - Capital of: Zabaykalsky District

Municipal status
  - Municipal district: Zabaykalsky Municipal District
  - Urban settlement: Zabaykalskoye Urban Settlement
  - Capital of: Zabaykalskoye Urban Settlement
- Time zone: UTC+9 (MSK+6)
- Postal code: 674650
- Dialing code: +7 674650
- OKTMO ID: 76612151051

Zabaykalsk (Russian: Забайка́льск; Simplified Chinese: 外贝加尔斯克) is an urban locality (an urban-type settlement) and the administrative center of Zabaykalsky District of Zabaykalsky Krai, Russia, located on the Sino-Russian border just opposite the Chinese border town of Manzhouli. Population: 10,210 (2002 census); 8,632 (1989 Soviet census).

== Geography ==
The formerly disputed Abagaitu Islet in the Argun River is located about 100 kilometers (62 mi) to the east.

=== Climate ===
Zabaikalsk has a humid continental climate (Köppen Dwb) with very warm summers and frigid, dry winters.

Climate data for Zabaikalsk, Zabaikalskii Krai, data from 1961~1990
Month	Jan	Feb	Mar	Apr	May	Jun	Jul	Aug	Sep	Oct	Nov	Dec	Year
Mean daily maximum °C (°F)	−18 (0)	−14 (7)	−3 (27)	9 (48)	18 (64)	24 (75)	26 (79)	24 (75)	17 (63)	8 (46)	−6 (21)	−16 (3)	6 (42)
Mean daily minimum °C (°F)	−31 (−24)	−28 (−18)	−18 (0)	−5 (23)	3 (37)	10 (50)	14 (57)	11 (52)	4 (39)	−6 (21)	−18 (0)	−27 (−17)	−8 (18)
Average precipitation mm (inches)	2 (0.1)	2 (0.1)	4 (0.2)	10 (0.4)	19 (0.7)	47 (1.9)	94 (3.7)	74 (2.9)	36 (1.4)	9 (0.4)	4 (0.2)	3 (0.1)	304 (12.1)
Average precipitation days	2	2	3	5	6	10	15	13	8	4	4	3	75

== History ==
Zabaykalsk and Manzhouli on the map of the region's major railways

It was founded in 1904 as a station (Razyezd 86, i.e. "Passing loop No. 86") on the Chinese Eastern Railway.

Since 1924, a border guard detachment has been stationed there. In the aftermath of the Sino-Soviet conflict (1929) the station was renamed Otpor ("Repulse").

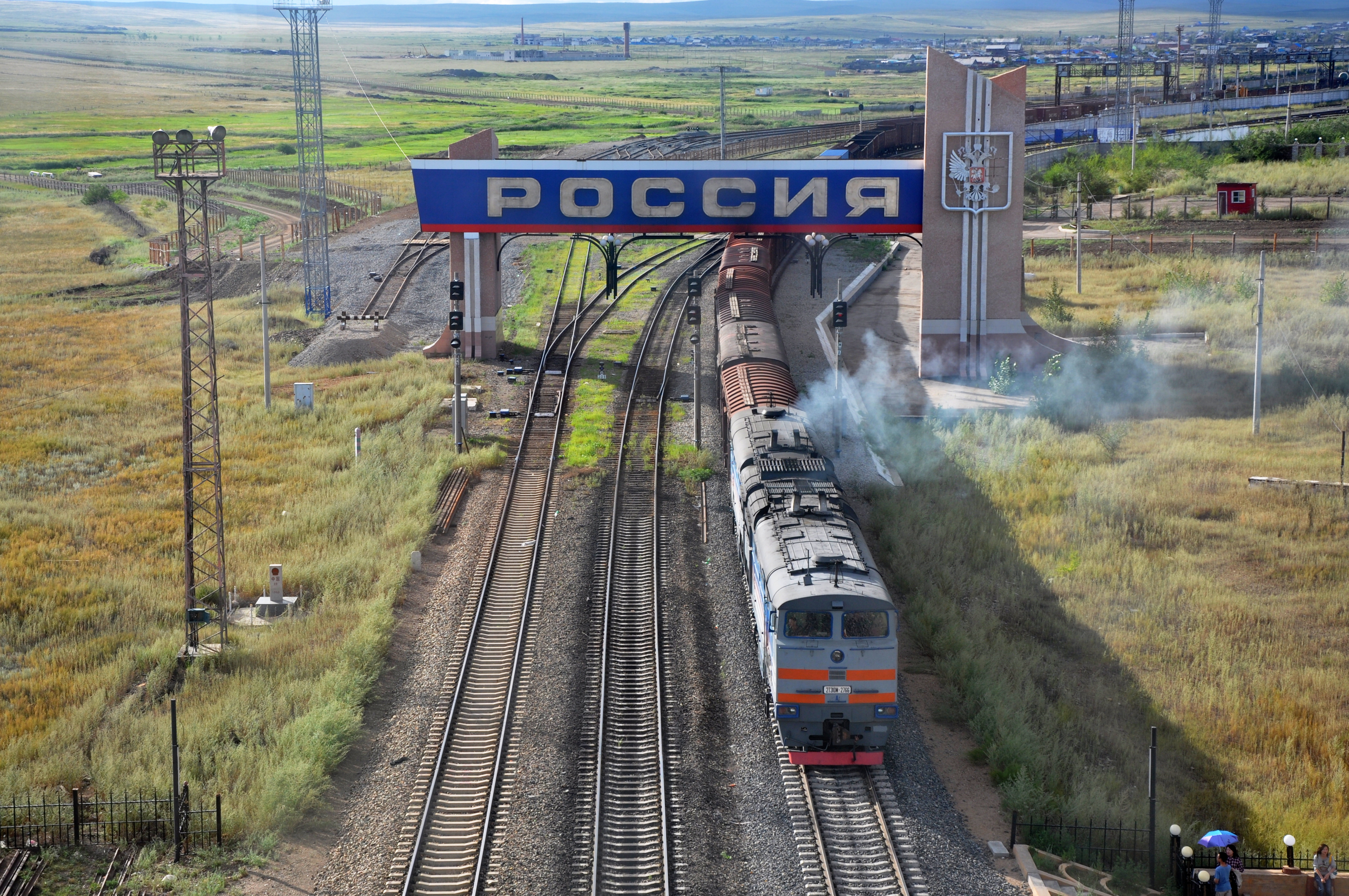
A train that passed the border crossing from Zabaykalsk to Manzhouli in China. (Coordinates: 49°37′49.24″N 117°20′20.68″E)

Until the mid-1930s, Razyezd 86 / Otpor had little significance as a station, as all border formalities were done at Matsiyevskaya station (deeper into Russia) and at Manzhouli Railway Station, on the Chinese side of the border. The station was expanded in the mid-1930s, as the railway on the Chinese side had been sold by the USSR to Manchukuo and converted from the 1,520 mm (4 ft 11 27/32 in) gauge of the Russian Railways to the 1,435 mm (4 ft 8 1/2 in) China Railway; Otpor thus became the last Russian-gauge station. The station became quite important in 1945, as one of the bases of the Soviet invasion of Manchuria, which also saw the rail line on the Chinese side temporary re-converted to Russian gauge. The station's importance continued as the main rail connection between the USSR and the Communist China. On China's request, in 1958 the Soviets changed the name "Otpor" to the neutral Zabaykalsk (i.e., "a city in Transbaikalia", or "a city beyond Lake Baikal").

=== Otpor Incident ===
Eighteen Jews fled from Europe to Otopol Station (now Zabaykalsk Station) on the Trans-Siberian Railway, located on the border between the Soviet Union and Manchuria. The Manchurian government refused to accept them for fear of worsening relations with Germany. Major General Kiichiro Higuchi, who was consulted by Abraham Kaufman, the head of the Far Eastern Jewish Association, saw the situation and together with his subordinates arranged for food, clothing, fuel to survive the cold, medical care, and a route to Shanghai for the Jews.

This route was called the "Higuchi Route," and it is said that between 4,000 and 20,000 Jews traveled to Shanghai via this route between 1938 and 1940. Later, Sugihara Chiune and Wang Kaewo rescued Jewish refugees to the Japanese concession in Shanghai. For this achievement, Higuchi's name was listed in the sixth "Golden Book" in 1941.

== Transportation ==
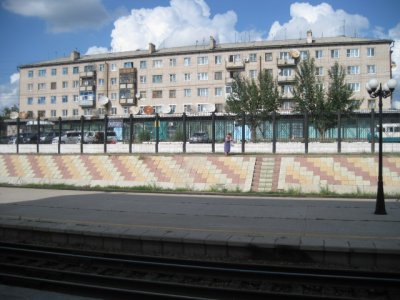
Zabaykalsk, where rail travelers switch from Russian-gauge to Chinese (standard)-gauge trains.

The Russo-Chinese highway AH6 passes through the town.

Zabaykalsk/Manzhouli is one of the three direct connections between Russian and Chinese Railways. The other two are in Primorsky Krai, much farther to the east, and a link via Mongolia. Zabaykalsk is served by what is now officially called the Southern Branch of the Transbaykal Railway (Южный ход Забайкальской железной дороги), a line that branches off the present-day main Trans-Siberian Railway line at Karymskaya junction (east of Chita), and continues southeast toward the Chinese border. Originally (until 1916), the line was part of the main Moscow-to-Vladivostok rail route, and trains coming from the west would continue into China on the former Chinese Eastern Railway, cutting across Manchuria on their way to Russian Vladivostok.

After the modern route of the Trans-Siberian Railway, located entirely within Russian national territory, was completed in 1916, the role of the Southern Branch was restricted to that of serving Russia's border communities, and providing a connection to China.

Zabaykalsk has been a transshipment station for the break of gauge since the 1930s, when the railway on the Chinese side was sold by the USSR to the Japanese puppet state of Manchukuo and converted from the 1,524 mm (5 ft) gauge of the Soviet Railways to the 1,435 mm (4 ft 8 1/2 in) Manchukuo National Railway.

Since 2005, a number of projects have been carried out to increase the capacity of the "Southern Branch", and its connection to China. The goal was that, by 2010, the railway could handle 30 trains in each direction, each one up to 71 cars long. By 2005, the maximum weight of the trains using the line had already been increased from 4,000 to 6,300 tons.

In 2008, TransContainer's container transshipment facility was expanded. Work on modernizing the facility for passenger railcar bogie exchange was conducted as well.

== Notable residents ==
- Lidia Bobrova, film director

== See also ==
- Longest trains
