= Zabaykalsky District =

Zabaykalsky District Забайкальский район (Russian)
- District
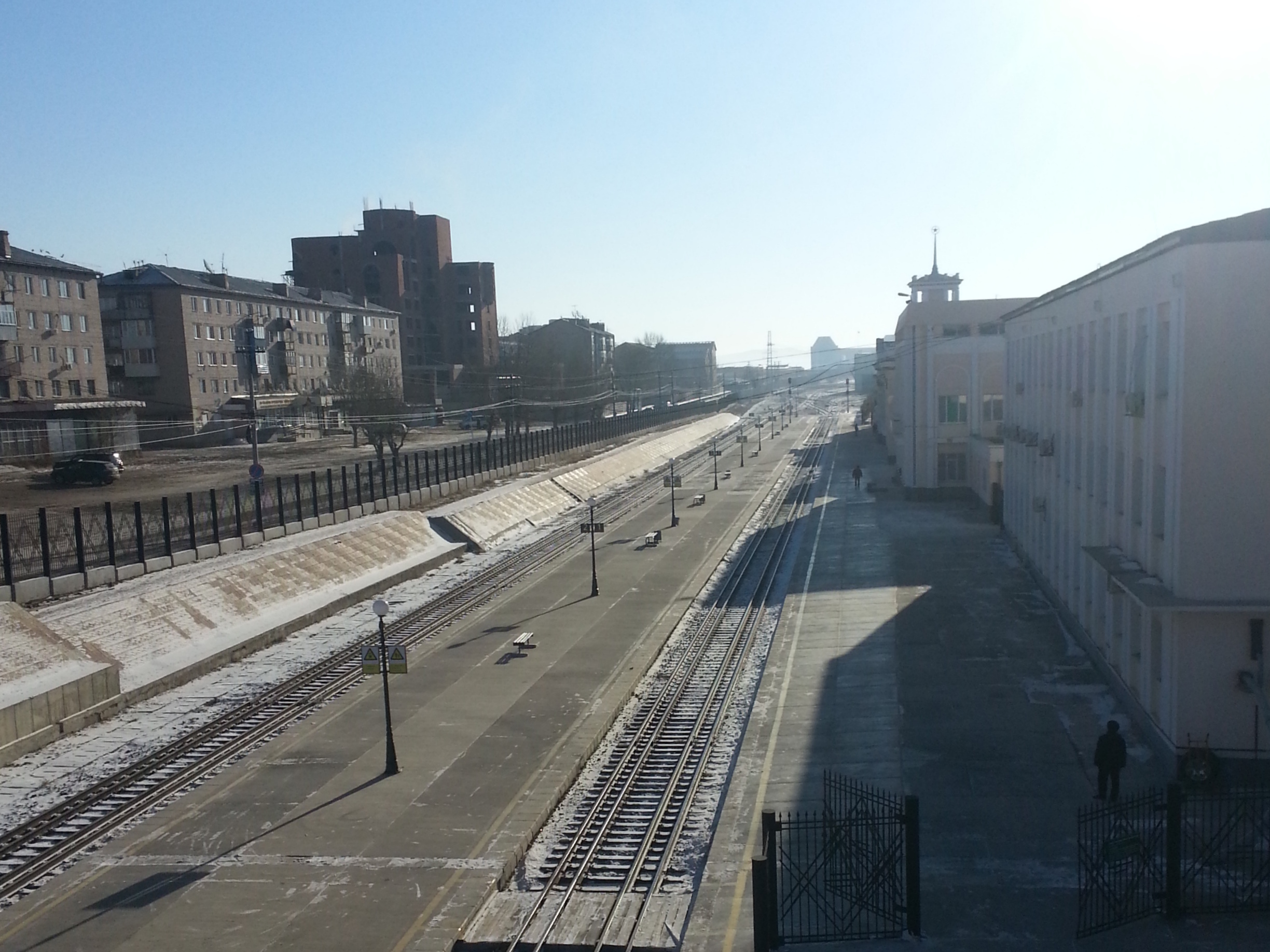
- Train station in Zabaykalsky

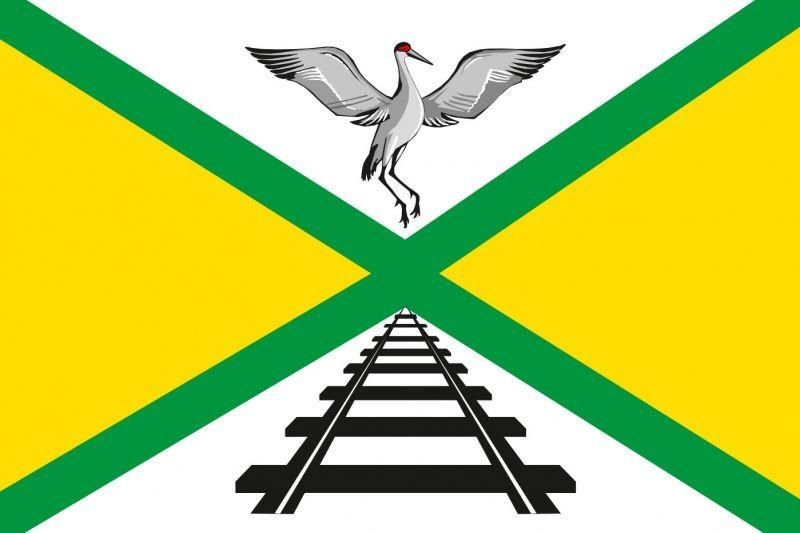
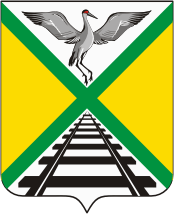
- Flag Coat of arms
- Location of Zabaykalsky District in Zabaykalsky Krai
- Coordinates: 49.909°N 117.275°E
- Country: Russia
- Federal subject: Zabaykalsky Krai
- Established: January 2, 1967
- Administrative center: Zabaykalsk

Area
  - Total: 5,100 km^{2} (2,000 sq mi)

Population (2010 Census)
  - Total: 20,485
  - Estimate (2018): 21,192 (+3.5%)
  - Density: 4.0/km^{2} (10/sq mi)
  - Urban: 57.5%
  - Rural: 42.5%

Administrative structure
  - Inhabited localities: 1 urban-type settlements, 10 rural localities

Municipal structure
  - Municipally incorporated as: Zabaykalsky Municipal District
  - Municipal divisions: 1 urban settlements, 7 rural settlements
- Time zone: UTC+9 (MSK+6)
- OKTMO ID: 76612000
- Website: http://zabaikalskadm.ru/

Zabaykalsky District (Russian: Забайка́льский райо́н) is an administrative and municipal district (raion), one of the thirty-one in Zabaykalsky Krai, Russia. It is located in the southeast of the krai, and borders with Borzinsky District in the north, Krasnokamensky District in the east, District in the south, and with District in the west. The area of the district is 5,100 square kilometers (2,000 sq mi). Its administrative center is the urban locality (an urban-type settlement) of Zabaykalsk. Population: 20,485 (2010 census); 20,343 (2002 Census); 22,121 (1989 Soviet census). The population of Zabaykalsk accounts for 57.5% of the district's total population.

== History ==
The district was established on January 2, 1967.
