= Yazhou railway station =

Railway station in Sanya, Hainan, China

Yazhou 崖州
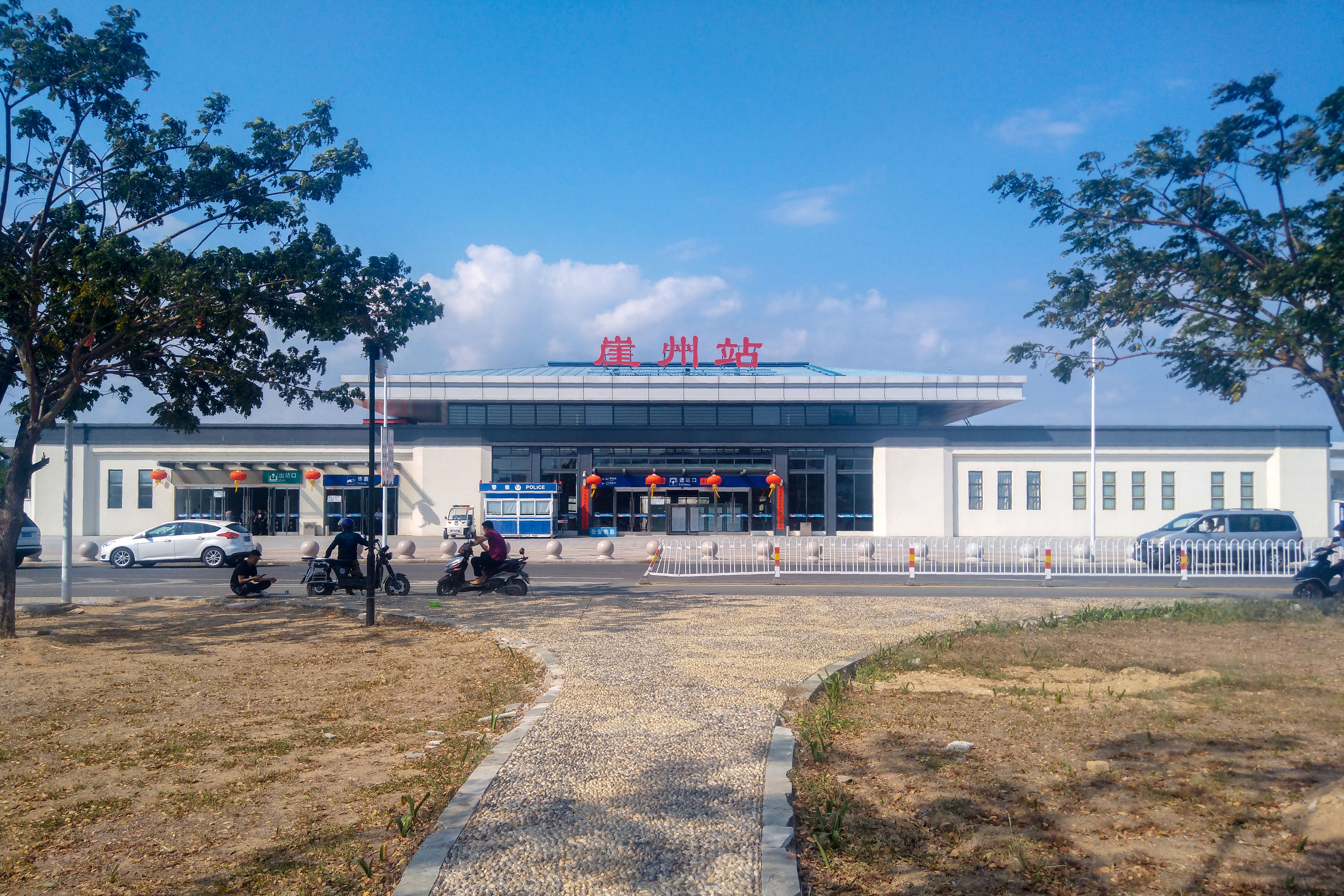

General information
- Coordinates: 18.3782°N 109.1535°E
- Lines: Hainan western ring railway; Hainan western ring high-speed railway
Location

Yazhou railway station is a railway station on the Hainan western ring high-speed railway located in Yazhou District, Sanya, Hainan, China.

Preceding station	China Railway High-speed	Following station
Ledong towards Haikou	Hainan western ring high-speed railway	Phoenix Airport towards Sanya
