= Ledong Li Autonomous County =

Ledong 乐东县
- Autonomous County
- 乐东黎族自治县; Ledong Li Autonomous County
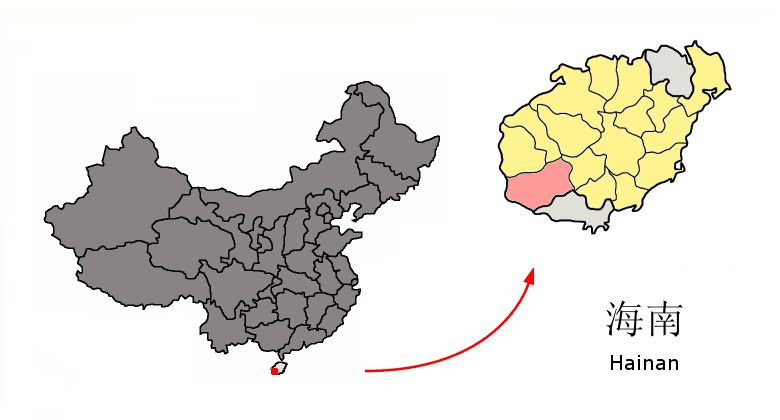
- Location in Hainan
- Coordinates: 18°44′52″N 109°17′31″E
- Country: People's Republic of China
- Province: Hainan
- County seat: Baoyou
- Township level subdivisions: 13: 11 towns 2 Similar to Township units

Government
  - County CCP Committee Secretary: Ma Yuhong (马育红)
  - Governor: Feng Jifang (冯基芳)

Area
  - Total: 2,745.4 km^{2} (1,060.0 sq mi)

Population (2020)
  - Total: 464,435
  - Density: 169.17/km^{2} (438.14/sq mi)
- Time zone: UTC+8 (China standard time)

Ledong Li Autonomous County (simplified Chinese: 乐东黎族自治县; traditional Chinese: 樂東黎族自治縣; pinyin: Lèdōng Lízú Zìzhìxiàn; postal: Loktung; Hlai language: Lokdhongx) is a Hlai autonomous county in Hainan province, China. It is one of six autonomous counties of Hainan. Its postal code is 572500. The county seat is Baoyou.

As of the 2020 Chinese census, Ledong County has a population of 464,435. It is the most populated Autonomous County in Hainan province.

== Administrative divisions ==
As of 2023, Ledong County has 11 towns and 2 Similar to township units:

=== Towns ===
- Baoyou (抱由镇)
- Wanchong (万冲镇)
- Da'an (大安镇)
- Zhizhong (志仲镇)
- Qianjia (千家镇)
- Jiusuo (九所镇)
- Liguo (利国镇)
- Huangliu (黄流镇)
- Foluo (佛罗镇)
- Jianfeng (尖峰镇)
- Yinggehai (莺歌海镇)

=== Similar to township units ===
- State-owned Jianfengling Forestry Company (国营尖峰岭林业公司)
- State-owned Yinggehai Salt Fields(国营莺歌海盐场)

== Politics and government ==
As of September 2025, the leadership structure of Ledong County is as follows:

- County Committee Secretary: Ma Yuhong (马育红) (Assumed office September 1, 2025)
- Deputy County Committee Secretary, County Governor and County People's Government Party Group Secretary: Feng Jifang (冯基芳) (Assumed office August 23, 2024)
- Executive Deputy Governor: Liu Xiaolei (柳晓磊) (Assumed office November 16, 2023)
- Deputy governor: He Fangchang (何方长)
- Deputy governor: Su Yiru (苏奕儒)
- Deputy governor: Wang Chao (王超)
- Deputy governor, Public Security Bureau Chief: Cai Xinwen (蔡新文)
- Deputy governor: Zhong Shi (钟帅)
- Deputy governor: Zhong Shuting (钟树婷, female)
- Deputy governor: Shan Jiliang (单既亮)
- Deputy governor: He Guohui (何国慧)

== Economy ==
As of 2025, Ledong County has a GDP of 22.757 Billion RMB.

Ledong County is a producer of mangos.

== Climate ==
Ledong has a tropical wet and dry climate (Köppen Aw). The coldest average monthly high temperature exceeds 26 °C (78.8 °F), the annual precipitation exceeds 1500 mm, cold waves rarely occur, and it is warm all year round. The Jianfengling National Nature Reserve and Jiaxi The provincial reserve has nurtured a large area of tropical seasonal forest with rich plant species and is one of the areas with the richest biodiversity in China.

Climate data for Ledong, elevation 155 m (509 ft), (1991–2020 normals, extremes 1963–present)
| Month | Jan | Feb | Mar | Apr | May | Jun | Jul | Aug | Sep | Oct | Nov | Dec | Year |
|---|---|---|---|---|---|---|---|---|---|---|---|---|---|
| Record high °C (°F) | 33.2 (91.8) | 36.2 (97.2) | 36.2 (97.2) | 38.6 (101.5) | 38.6 (101.5) | 38.2 (100.8) | 37.5 (99.5) | 37.1 (98.8) | 35.9 (96.6) | 35.3 (95.5) | 34.2 (93.6) | 33.1 (91.6) | 38.6 (101.5) |
| Mean daily maximum °C (°F) | 26.5 (79.7) | 27.8 (82.0) | 30.2 (86.4) | 32.5 (90.5) | 33.5 (92.3) | 33.0 (91.4) | 32.6 (90.7) | 32.2 (90.0) | 31.9 (89.4) | 30.8 (87.4) | 29.1 (84.4) | 26.5 (79.7) | 30.6 (87.0) |
| Daily mean °C (°F) | 20.2 (68.4) | 21.3 (70.3) | 23.7 (74.7) | 26.2 (79.2) | 27.6 (81.7) | 27.9 (82.2) | 27.6 (81.7) | 27.1 (80.8) | 26.6 (79.9) | 25.3 (77.5) | 23.5 (74.3) | 20.9 (69.6) | 24.8 (76.7) |
| Mean daily minimum °C (°F) | 16.1 (61.0) | 17.1 (62.8) | 19.5 (67.1) | 22.2 (72.0) | 23.8 (74.8) | 24.6 (76.3) | 24.4 (75.9) | 24.2 (75.6) | 23.5 (74.3) | 21.9 (71.4) | 19.8 (67.6) | 17.2 (63.0) | 21.2 (70.1) |
| Record low °C (°F) | 1.1 (34.0) | 4.0 (39.2) | 9.1 (48.4) | 13.7 (56.7) | 16.3 (61.3) | 21.4 (70.5) | 19.3 (66.7) | 20.6 (69.1) | 18.8 (65.8) | 12.2 (54.0) | 10.0 (50.0) | 4.4 (39.9) | 1.1 (34.0) |
| Average precipitation mm (inches) | 10.6 (0.42) | 17.6 (0.69) | 27.1 (1.07) | 77.1 (3.04) | 162.4 (6.39) | 242.7 (9.56) | 294.5 (11.59) | 331.0 (13.03) | 256.1 (10.08) | 149.6 (5.89) | 63.1 (2.48) | 20.4 (0.80) | 1,652.2 (65.04) |
| Average precipitation days (≥ 0.1 mm) | 4.7 | 5.4 | 6.1 | 8.4 | 13.1 | 15.4 | 17.4 | 20.0 | 18.9 | 13.9 | 7.0 | 4.5 | 134.8 |
| Average relative humidity (%) | 76 | 77 | 77 | 77 | 79 | 82 | 83 | 86 | 85 | 80 | 77 | 75 | 80 |
| Mean monthly sunshine hours | 153.8 | 139.6 | 157.2 | 178.8 | 196.6 | 169.1 | 171.4 | 157.0 | 148.3 | 179.3 | 172.6 | 149.1 | 1,972.8 |
| Percentage possible sunshine | 45 | 43 | 42 | 47 | 49 | 43 | 42 | 40 | 41 | 50 | 52 | 44 | 45 |
Source: China Meteorological Administration all-time extreme lowall-time October record

== Transportation ==
=== Highways ===
National Highway 225 and the G98 Hainan Island Ring Expressway pass through Ledong County.

=== Railways ===
The Guangdong-Hainan railway and the Hainan western ring high-speed railway pass through Ledong County.

Ledong railway station is located in Ledong County. It was opened December 30, 2015 as part of the Hainan western ring railway.

== See also ==
- List of administrative divisions of Hainan
