= Huangliu railway station =

Railway station in Huangliu, Hainan, China

Huangliu 黄流
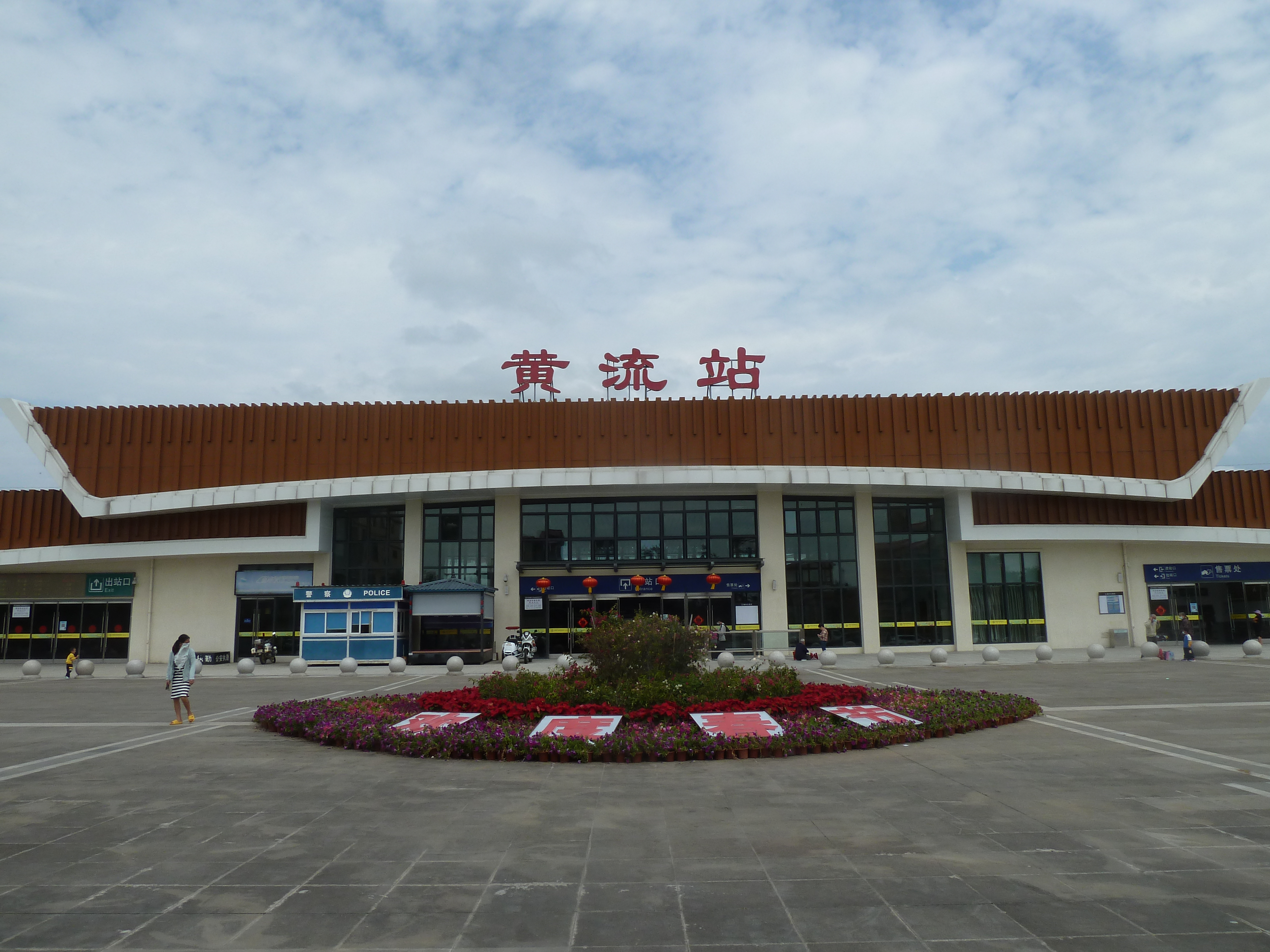

General information
- Coordinates: 18.5303°N 108.8271°E
- Line: Hainan western ring railway
Location

Huangliu railway station is a railway station on the Hainan western ring high-speed railway located in Hainan, China.

Preceding station	China Railway High-speed	Following station
Jianfeng towards Haikou	Hainan western ring high-speed railway	Ledong towards Sanya
