= Qiziwan railway station =

Railway station in Hainan, China

Qiziwan 棋子湾

General information
- Coordinates: 19.338978°N 108.804417°E
- Line: Hainan western ring high-speed railway
Location
- Location within Hainan Location within China

Qiziwan railway station is a railway station on the Hainan western ring high-speed railway located in Hainan, China.

Preceding station	China Railway High-speed	Following station
Haitou towards Haikou	Hainan western ring high-speed railway	Dongfang towards Sanya
