= Yintan railway station =

Railway station in Danzhou, China

Yintan 银滩

General information
- Location: Danzhou, Hainan, China
- Coordinates: 19°47′30.06″N 109°29′7.21″E
- Line: Hainan western ring high-speed railway

History
- Opened: 30 December 2015
Location

Yintan railway station (Chinese: 银滩站) is a railway station located in Danzhou, Hainan, China. It is an intermediate stop on the Hainan western ring high-speed railway. It opened with the line on 30 December 2015.

Preceding station	China Railway High-speed	Following station
Lingao South towards Haikou	Hainan western ring high-speed railway	Baimajing towards Sanya
