= Fushanzhen railway station =

Railway station in Hainan, China

Fushanzhen 福山镇

General information
- Coordinates: 19°52′41.24″N 109°54′51.40″E
- Line: Hainan western ring high-speed railway
Location

Fushanzhen railway station is a railway station on the Hainan western ring high-speed railway located in Hainan, China.

Preceding station	China Railway High-speed	Following station
Laochengzhen towards Haikou	Hainan western ring high-speed railway	Lingao South towards Sanya
