= Jinyuewan railway station =

Railway station in Hainan, China

Jinyuewan 金月湾
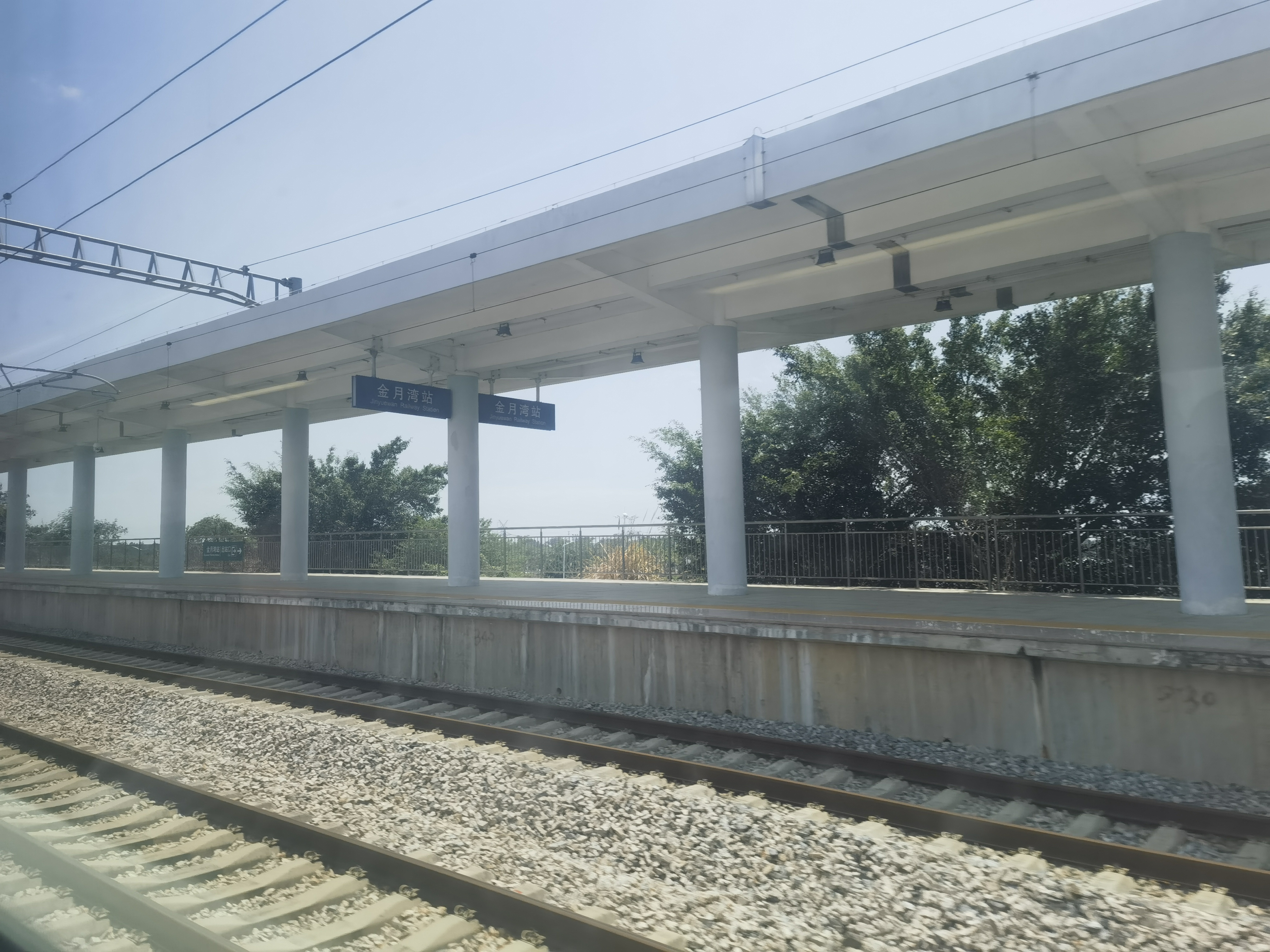
- Jinyuewan railway station

General information
- Coordinates: 18°46′49.04″N 108°42′44.04″E
- Line: Hainan western ring high-speed railway
Location

Jinyuewan railway station is a railway station on the Hainan western ring high-speed railway located in Hainan, China.

Preceding station	China Railway High-speed	Following station
Dongfang towards Haikou	Hainan western ring high-speed railway	Jianfeng towards Sanya
