= Lingao South railway station =

Railway station in Hainan, China

Lingao South 临高南
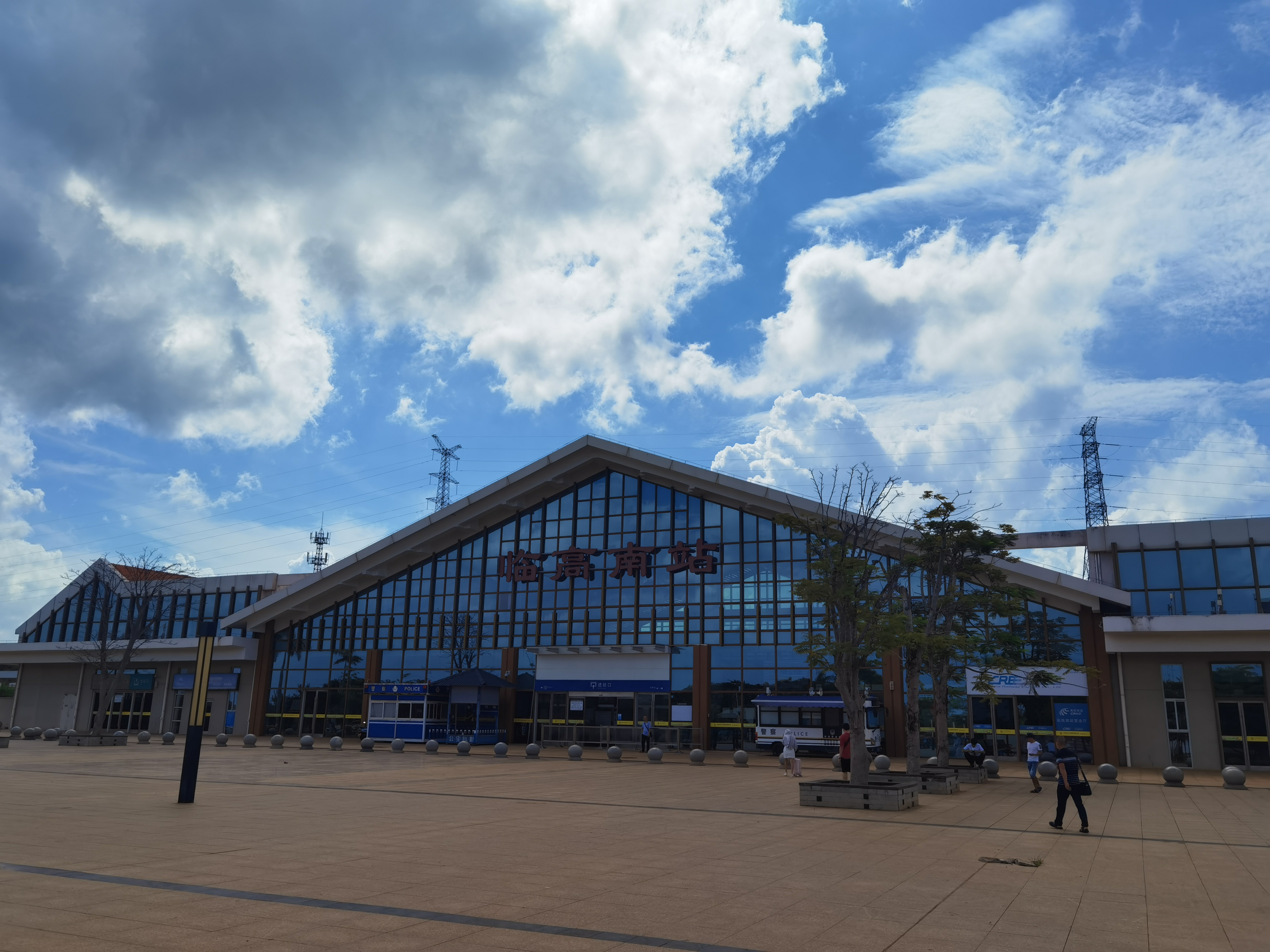
- Lingao South Railway Station is a railway station in Lingao County, Hainan Province, China

General information
- Coordinates: 19°52′9.35″N 109°45′19.66″E
- Line: Hainan western ring high-speed railway
Location

Lingaonan (or Lingao South) is a railway station on the Hainan western ring high-speed railway located in Hainan, China. According to Nanhai, the station has a "a three-tiered, mountain-like roof design, creating a rich and elegant spatial experience". In 2026, 38 trains passed through the station daily.

Preceding station	China Railway High-speed	Following station
Fushanzhen towards Haikou	Hainan western ring high-speed railway	Yintan towards Sanya
