= Hainan Ring =

Hainan Ring may refer to several transportation features in the Chinese province of Hainan:

- G98 Hainan Island Ring Expressway
- Hainan Eastern Ring High-Speed Railway
- Hainan Western Ring Railway
- Hainan Western Ring High-Speed Railway
