= Dongfang railway station =

Railway station in Hainan, China

Dongfang 东方
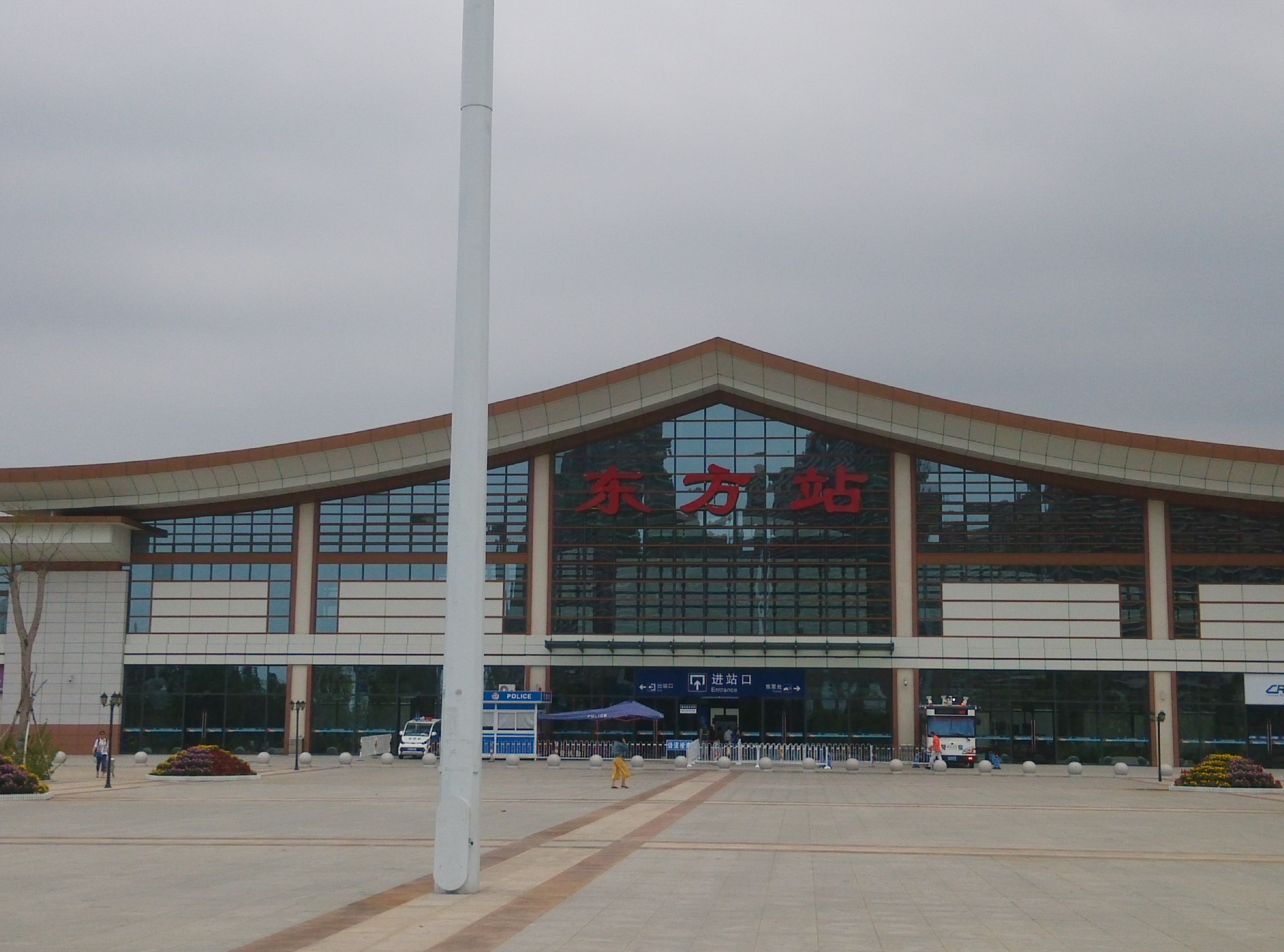

General information
- Location: Basuo, Dongfang, Hainan
- Coordinates: 19.090057°N 108.687738°E
- Lines: Hainan western ring railway; Hainan western ring high-speed railway

Other information
- Station code: 51475

History
- Opened: 18 April 2007
Location

Dongfang railway station is a railway station on the Hainan western ring railway and the Hainan western ring high-speed railway located in Hainan, China.

Preceding station	China Railway High-speed	Following station
Qiziwan towards Haikou	Hainan western ring high-speed railway	Jinyuewan towards Sanya
