= Ledong railway station =

Railway station in Hainan, China

Ledong 乐东
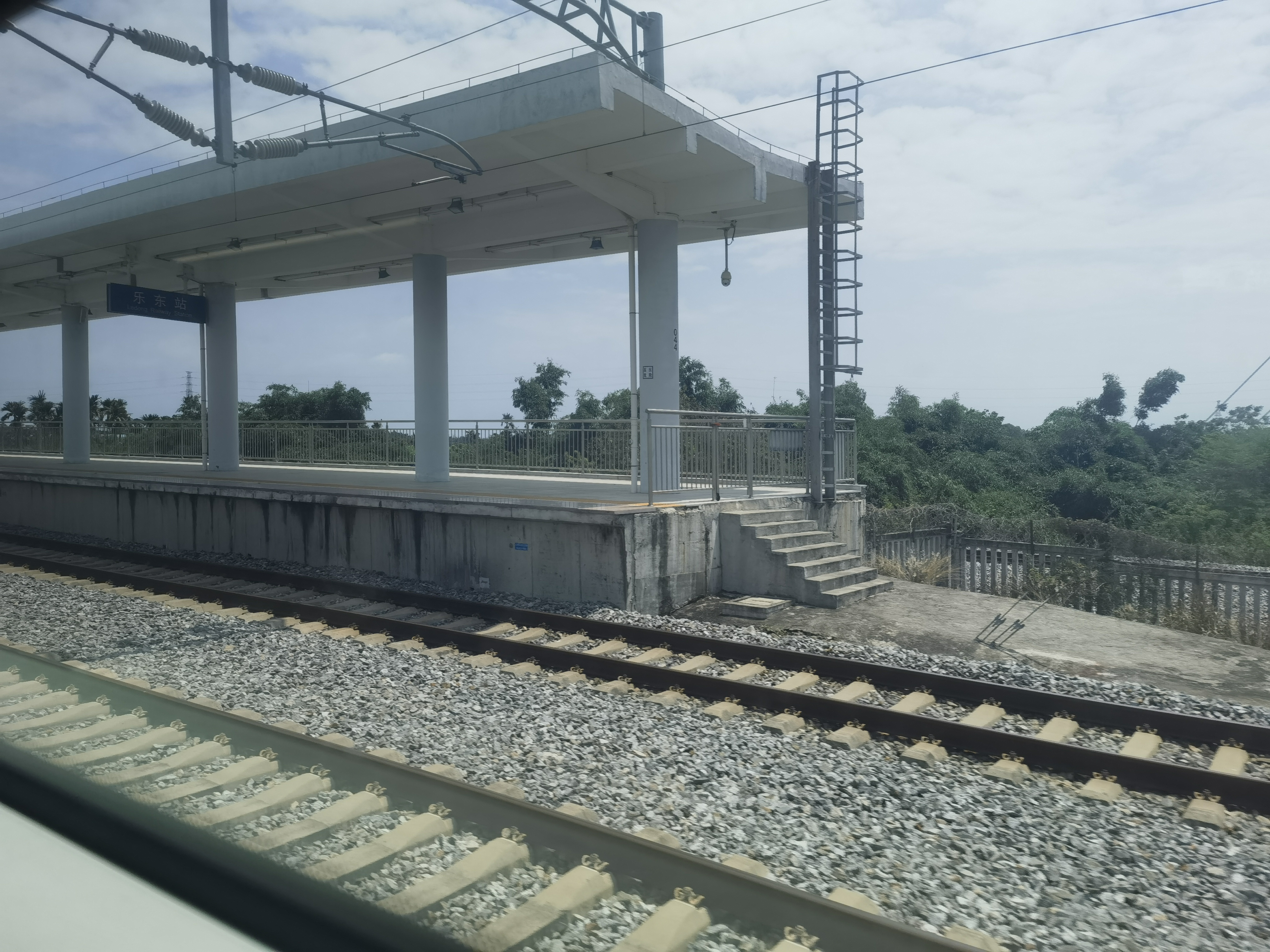
- Ledong Station Platform

General information
- Coordinates: 18°26′48.47″N 108°56′5.00″E
- Lines: Hainan western ring railway; Hainan western ring high-speed railway
Location

Ledong railway station is a railway station on the Hainan western ring railway and the Hainan western ring high-speed railway located in Hainan, China.

Preceding station	China Railway High-speed	Following station
Huangliu towards Haikou	Hainan western ring high-speed railway	Yazhou towards Sanya
