= Jianfeng railway station =

Railway station in Hainan, China

Jianfeng 尖峰

General information
- Coordinates: 18°37′23.36″N 108°44′57.22″E
- Line: Hainan western ring high-speed railway
Location

Jianfeng railway station is a railway station on the Hainan western ring high-speed railway located in Hainan, China.

| Preceding station | China Railway High-speed | Following station |
|---|---|---|
| Jinyuewan towards Haikou | Hainan western ring high-speed railway | Huangliu towards Sanya |
