= 2019 Hainan PLAN fighter plane crash =

Aviation accident in China

Occurrence
- Date: March 12, 2019
- Summary: Crash
- Site: Ledong Li Autonomous County, Hainan Province, China

Aircraft
- Aircraft type: JH-7A (speculated)
- Operator: People's Liberation Army Navy
- Crew: 2
- Fatalities: 2
- Survivors: 0

On 12 March 2019, a fighter plane of the People's Liberation Army Navy, likely a Xi'an JH-7A, crashed in Ledong Li Autonomous County while on a training flight. The pilots Ren Yongtao and Zhan Jinxin were killed, and were later called martyrs by the Southern Theater Command Navy Air Force

The aircraft suffered a malfunction and the cause of the ejection seat failure leading to the pilots' deaths remains unknown.

== Crew ==
The first pilot involved was 36-year-old Ren Yongtao from Xi'an, who enlisted in 2000 and had a rank of colonel. He had participated in the National Day 60th Anniversary Parade and the South China Sea Naval parade.

The second pilot involved was 26-year-old Zhan Jinxin from Yantai, who enlisted in 2011 and had a rank of second lieutenant. He had represented the former Naval Aviation Engineering Academy in an international triathlon competition in Turkey.

== Aircraft ==
Following the accident, the Chinese government did not disclose the type of the crashed aircraft. Given the deployment of J-11BH single-seat heavy fighters and JH-7A dual-seat fighter-bombers in Ledong Li County, media reports have speculated or cited anonymous sources indicating the aircraft type as JH-7A.

== Commemoration ==
On March 18, 2019, the ashes of Ren Yongtao were returned to his hometown under the escort of his unit, with related departments in Xi'an, Shaanxi, and Huyi District holding a "Welcome Hero Martyr Home" memorial event. In the afternoon of March 18, a ceremony to receive Zhan Jinxin's ashes was held at Qingdao Liuting International Airport, with relevant departments from Yantai and Laizhou present. On March 19, Zhan's ashes were interred in the Laizhou Hongtuya Revolutionary Martyrs Cemetery in Shandong There was continuing coverage about them over a year after the crash.
