= Huangliu =

Town in Hainan, China

Coordinates: 18°30′22″N 108°47′20″E

Huangliu 黄流镇
- Town
- Interactive map of Huangliu
- Country: China
- Province: Hainan
- Autonomous county: Ledong
- Subdivisions: 23: 1 community 22 villages

Huangliu town (Chinese: 黄流镇; pinyin: Huángliú zhèn) is a town in Ledong Li Autonomous County of Hainan Province of China. It is located near the southwestern coast of Hainan Island. The coastal highway (China National Highway 225) runs through the town.

Huangliu Station of the Hainan Western Ring Railway is located north of the town. From this station, a short railway branch runs southwest to the Yinggehai Salt Evaporation Ponds (莺歌海盐场), which are situated on the sea coast between Huangliu and the nearby Yinggehai Town.

== See also ==
- List of township-level divisions of Hainan
