= Baimajing =

Baimajing 白马井镇
- Town
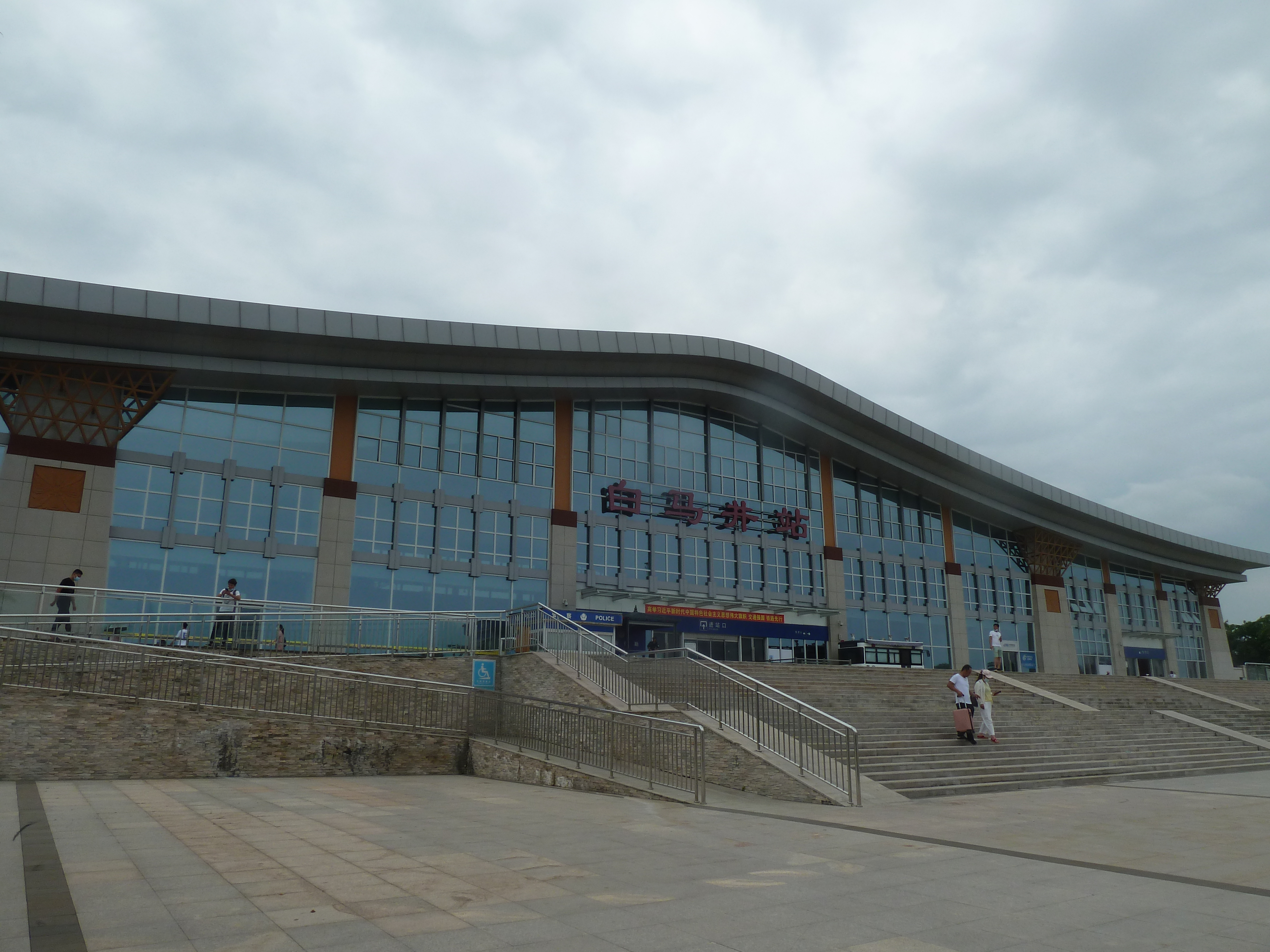
- Baimajing railway station

- Location of Baimajing in Hainan
- Coordinates: 19.709586°N 109.222898°E
- Country: People's Republic of China
- Province: Hainan
- Prefecture-level city: Danzhou

Area
  - Total: 73.50 km^{2} (28.38 sq mi)

Population (2018)
  - Total: 63,618
  - Density: 865.6/km^{2} (2,242/sq mi)
- Time zone: UTC+8 (China Standard Time)

Baimajing (simplified Chinese: 白马井; traditional Chinese: 白馬井; pinyin: Báimǎjǐng Zhèn; lit. 'White Horse Well Town') is a town in Danzhou, Hainan, China. The town spans an area of 73.50 square kilometres (28.38 mi^{2}), and has a hukou population of 63,618 as of 2018.

== History ==
In 2002, almost all of the former township of Songming Township (Chinese: 松鸣乡) was merged into Baimajing, except for of the village of Xindi (Chinese: 新地村).

== Geography ==
Baimajing is located in the west of Danzhou, approximately 60 kilometres (37 mi) from the city center.

== Administrative divisions ==
Baimajing administers 7 residential communities (Chinese: 社区; pinyin: shèqū) and 15 administrative villages (Chinese: 行政村; pinyin: xíngzhèng cūn).

=== Residential communities ===
Baimajing administers the following 7 residential communities:

- Shengli Community (Chinese: 胜利社区; lit. 'Victory Community')
- Jiefang Community (Chinese: 解放社区; lit. 'Liberation Community')
- Haibin Community (Chinese: 海滨社区; lit. 'Seashore Community')
- Dongfang Community (Chinese: 东方社区; lit. 'The East Community')
- Xinjie Community (Chinese: 新街社区; lit. 'New Street Community')
- Xinma Community (Chinese: 新马社区)
- Nansi Community (Chinese: 南司社区)

=== Administrative villages ===
Baimajing administers the following 15 administrative villages:

- Fucun Village (Chinese: 福村村)
- Tenggen Village (Chinese: 藤根村)
- Henang Village (Chinese: 禾囊村)
- Makoujing Village (Chinese: 马口井村)
- Qiandi Village (Chinese: 钱地村)
- Zhugu Village (Chinese: 竹古村)
- Shanhua Village (Chinese: 山花村)
- Zhaiji Village (Chinese: 寨基村)
- Nanzhuang Village (Chinese: 南庄村)
- Songming Village (Chinese: 松鸣村)
- Yingfeng Village (Chinese: 英丰村)
- Jiudi Village (Chinese: 旧地村)
- Lancheng Village (Chinese: 兰城村)
- Xuelan Village (Chinese: 学兰村)
- Dongshan Village (Chinese: 东山村)

== Demographics ==
Baimajing has a hukou population of 63,618 as of 2018. As of the 2010 Chinese Census, Baimajing had a population of 59,585. The town had a recorded population of 35,606 in the 2000 Chinese Census.

== Economy ==
The town has a port used for the import and export of goods.

== Transportation ==
The town is served by Baimajing railway station.

== See also ==
- Baimajing railway station
- Ocean Flower Island
- List of township-level divisions of Hainan
