= Laochengzhen railway station =

Railway station in Hainan, China

Laochengzhen 老城镇
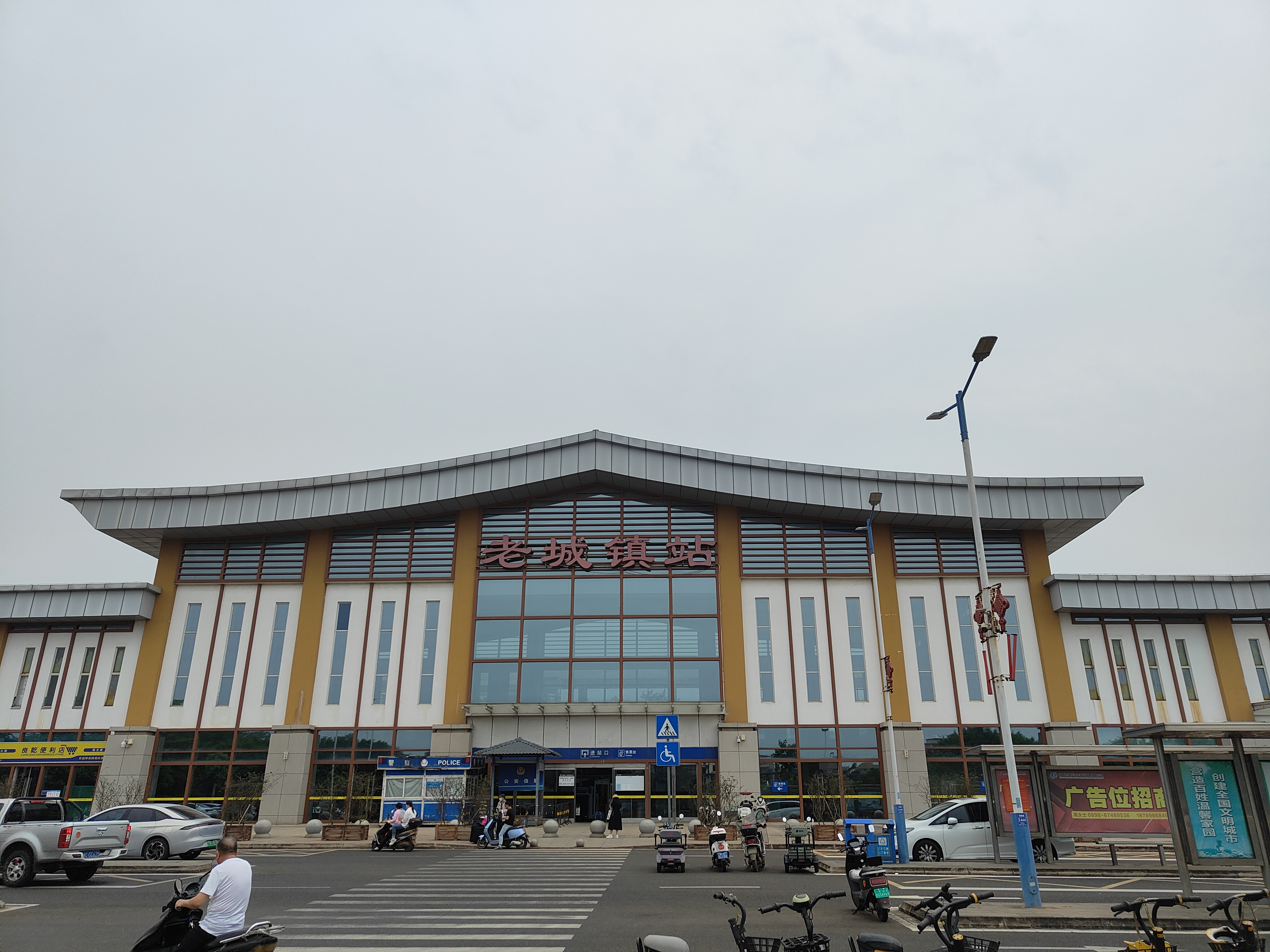

General information
- Coordinates: 19.9339°N 110.1132°E
- Line: Hainan western ring high-speed railway
Location

Laochengzhen railway station is a railway station on the Hainan western ring high-speed railway located in Laocheng Town, Chengmai County, Hainan, China.

Preceding station	China Railway High-speed	Following station
Haikou Terminus	Hainan western ring high-speed railway	Fushanzhen towards Sanya
