= Phoenix Airport railway station =

Railway station in Hainan, China

Phoenix Airport 凤凰机场
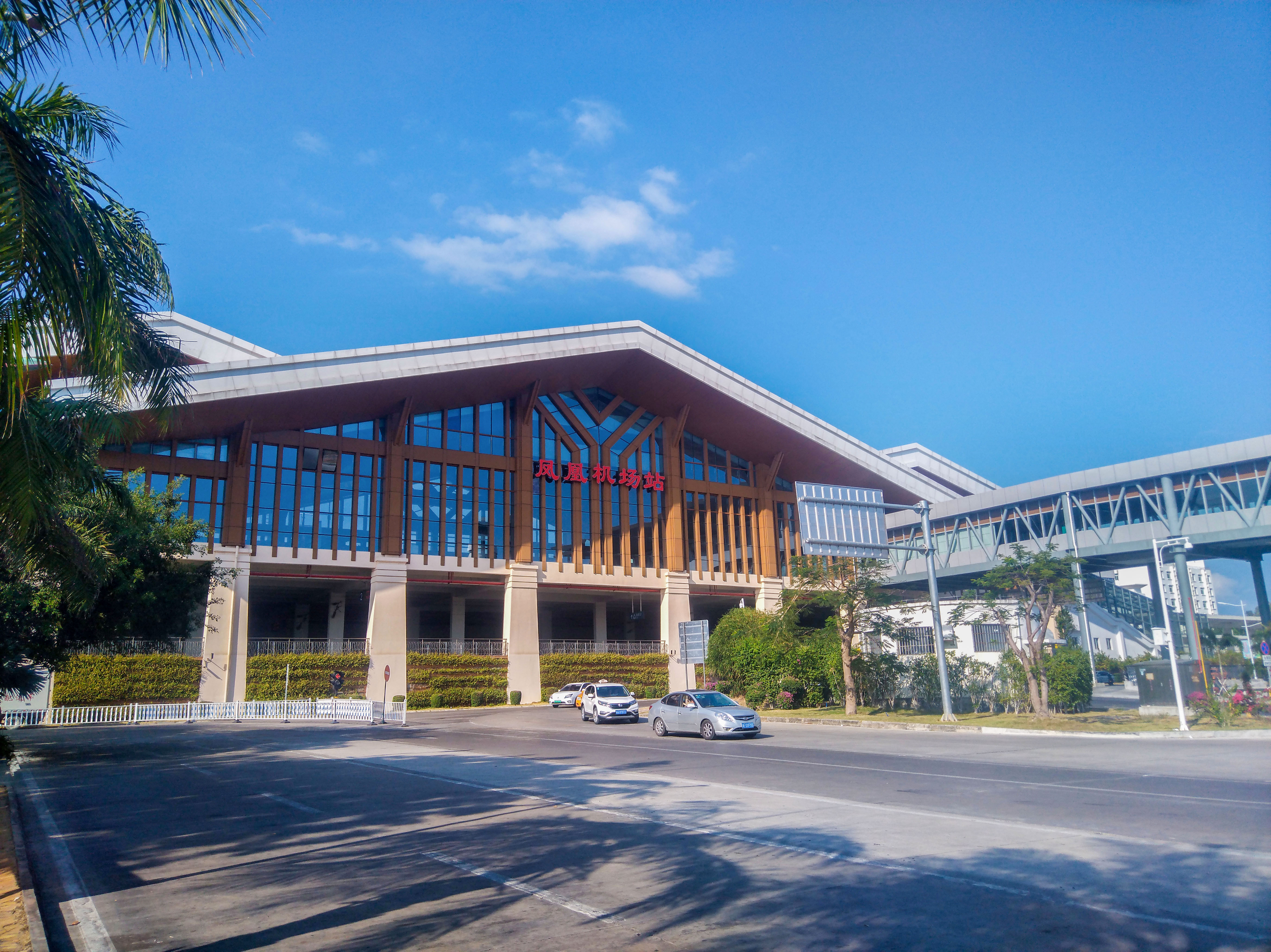

General information
- Coordinates: 18°19′06″N 109°24′24″E
- Line: Hainan western ring high-speed railway

History
- Opened: 30 December 2015
Location

Phoenix Airport railway station, alternatively Fenghuang Airport railway station or Fenghuangjichang railway station (Chinese: 凤凰机场站; pinyin: Fènghuáng Jīchǎng Zhàn) is a railway station on the Hainan western ring high-speed railway. It is located on the western outskirts of Sanya City, some 15 km west of downtown, adjacent to Sanya Phoenix International Airport. The station started operation on 30 December 2015.

== History ==
The 10-km-long section from the Sanya railway station to the Phoenix Airport railway station is the first section of the Hainan Western Ring High-Speed Railway. The construction work was completed by the end of 2014. Since the rest of the Western Ring Railway (i.e., the much longer section from the Phoenix Airport to Haikou) was completed significantly later, the Sanya railway station to Phoenix Airport railway station section was presumably operated for a while as an extension of the Hainan eastern ring high-speed railway (for which the Sanya railway station is presently the terminal).

== Notes ==
Preceding station	China Railway High-speed	Following station
Yazhou towards Haikou	Hainan western ring high-speed railway	Sanya Terminus
