= Baimajing railway station =

Railway station in Baimajing, China

Baimajing 白马井
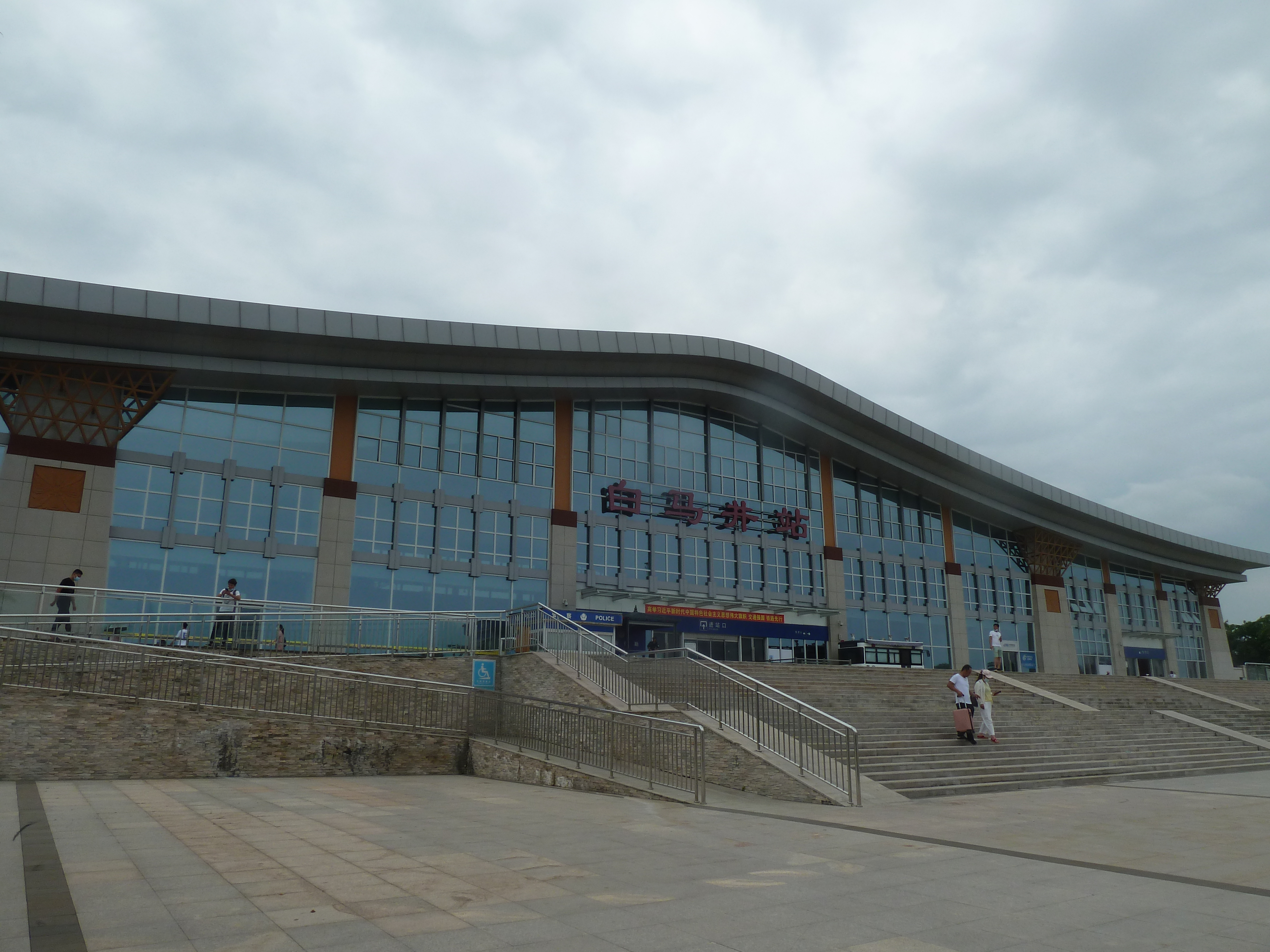

General information
- Coordinates: 19.6599°N 109.2499°E
- Line: Hainan western ring high-speed railway
Location
- Location within Hainan Location within China

Baimajing railway station is a railway station on the Hainan western ring high-speed railway located in Hainan, China.

Preceding station	China Railway High-speed	Following station
Yintan towards Haikou	Hainan western ring high-speed railway	Haitou towards Sanya
