= Liguo, Hainan =

Liguo Town
- Town

Chinese transcription(s)
  - Simplified: 利国镇
  - Traditional: 利國鎮
  - Pinyin: Lìguó Zhèn
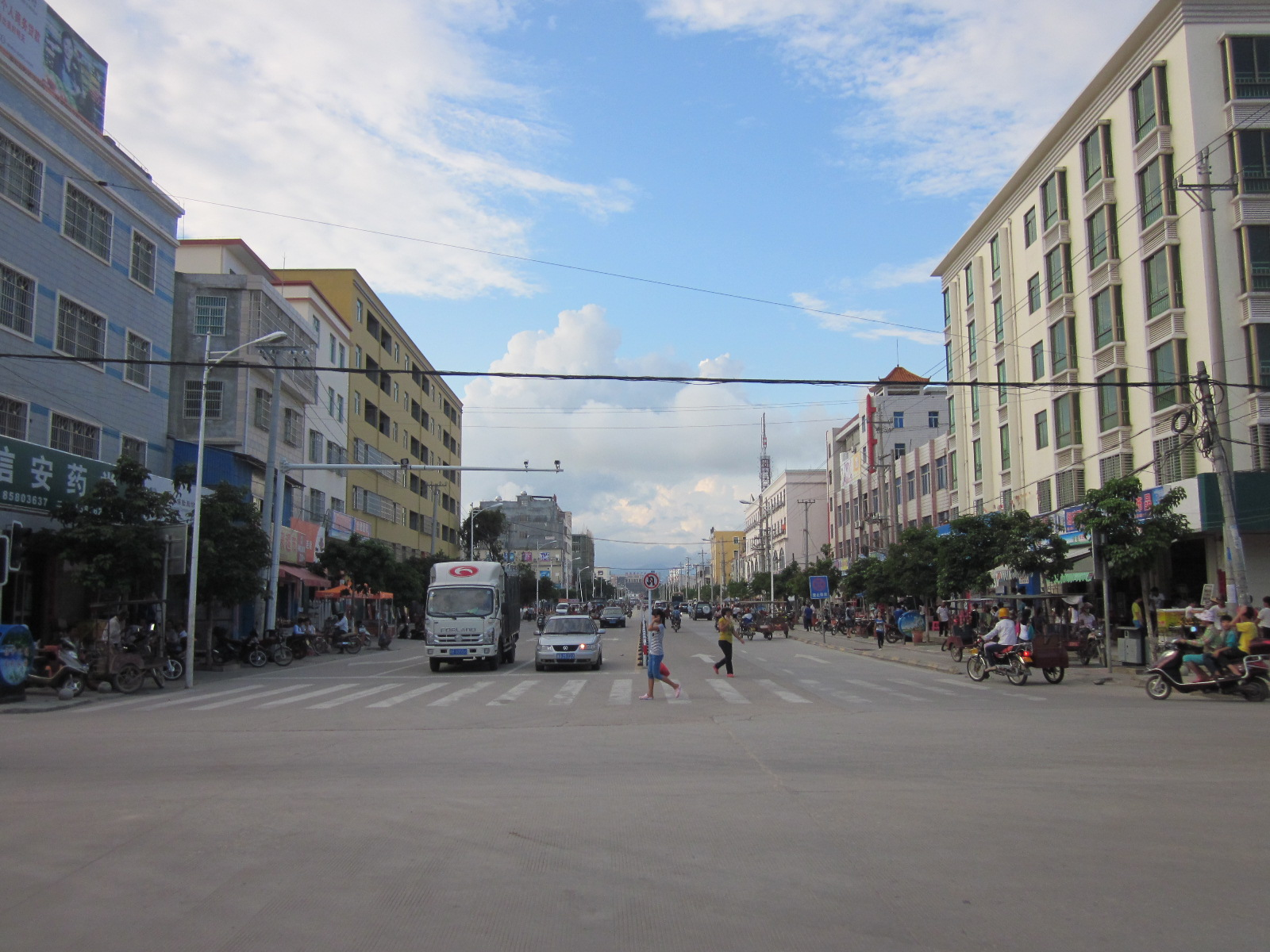

- Location in Hainan Liguo Town (China)
- Coordinates: 18°27′27″N 108°53′35″E
- Country: People's Republic of China
- Province: Hainan
- County: Ledong Li Autonomous County

Area
  - Total: 216.4 km^{2} (83.6 sq mi)

Population
  - Total: 44,638
  - Density: 206.3/km^{2} (534.3/sq mi)
- Time zone: UTC+8 (China Standard)
- Postal code: 572534
- Area code: 0898

Liguo (simplified Chinese: 利国镇; traditional Chinese: 利國鎮; pinyin: Lìguó Zhèn) is a rural town in Ledong Li Autonomous County, Hainan, People's Republic of China.

== Administrative divisions ==
It include 15 villages and 1 community:

- Liguo Community (利国社区)
- Qinbiao Village (秦标村)
- Fofeng Village (佛丰村)
- Guan Village (官村)
- Hekou Village (荷口村)
- Baosui Village (抱岁村)
- Xinlian Village (新联村)
- Xinmin Village (新民村)
- Baoxin Village (抱新村)
- Hongwu Village (红五村)
- Wenqie Village (文且村)
- Baogao Village (抱告村)
- Maopo Village (茅坡村)
- Qiugang Village (球港村)
- Yangshang Village (羊上村)
- Wanglou Village (望楼村)

== Gallery ==
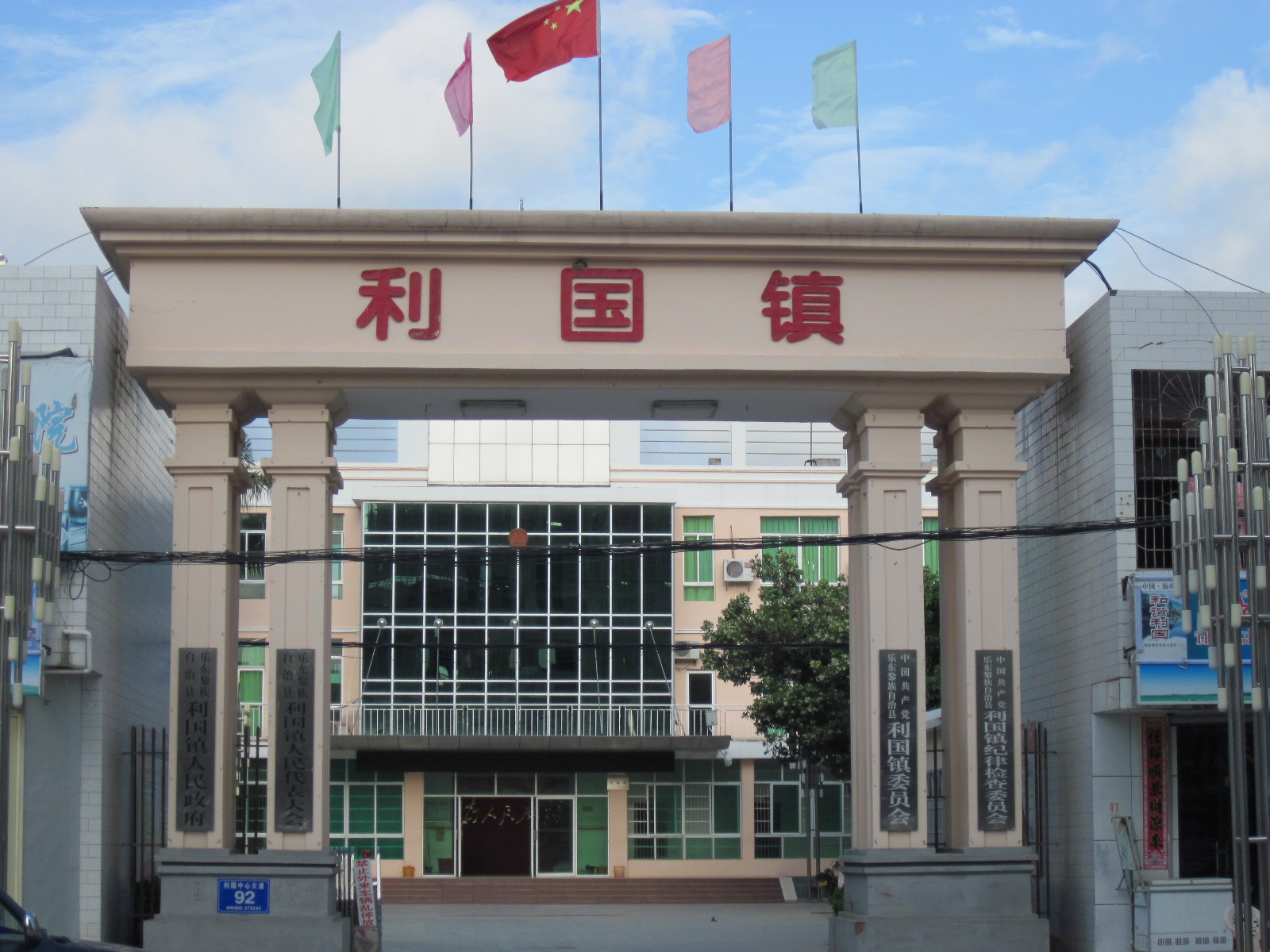
Government Building

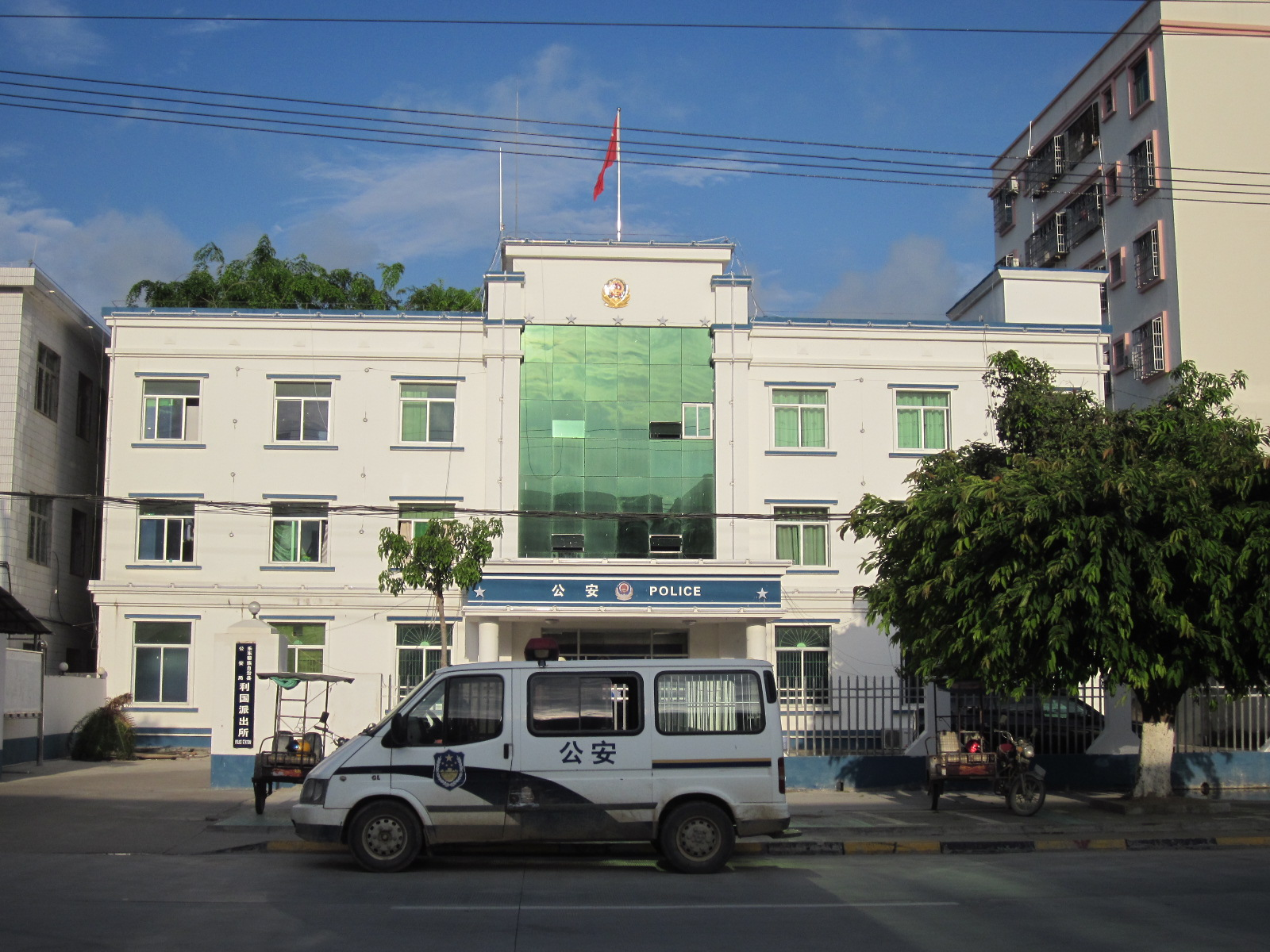
Liguo Police Station

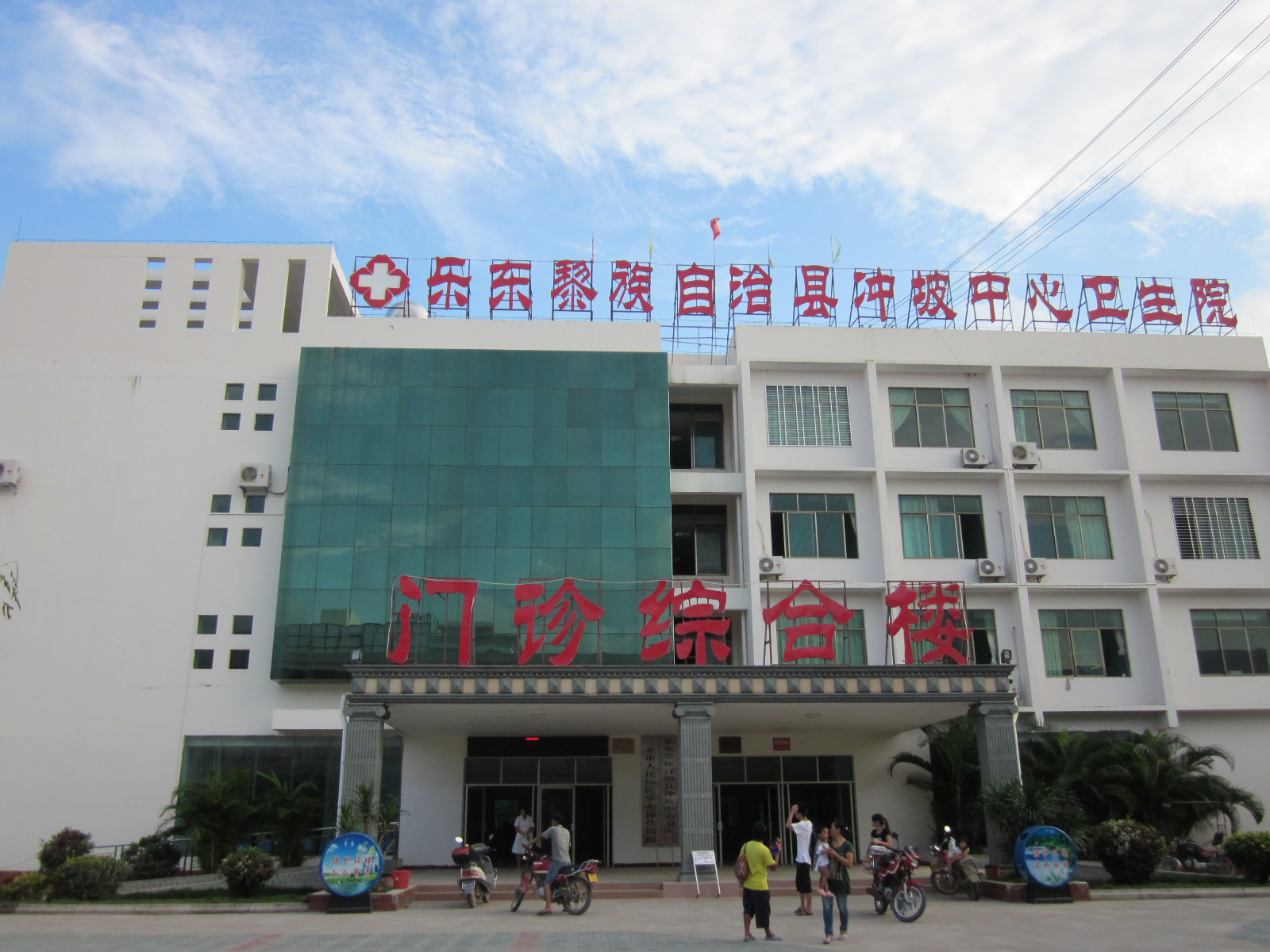
Health Center

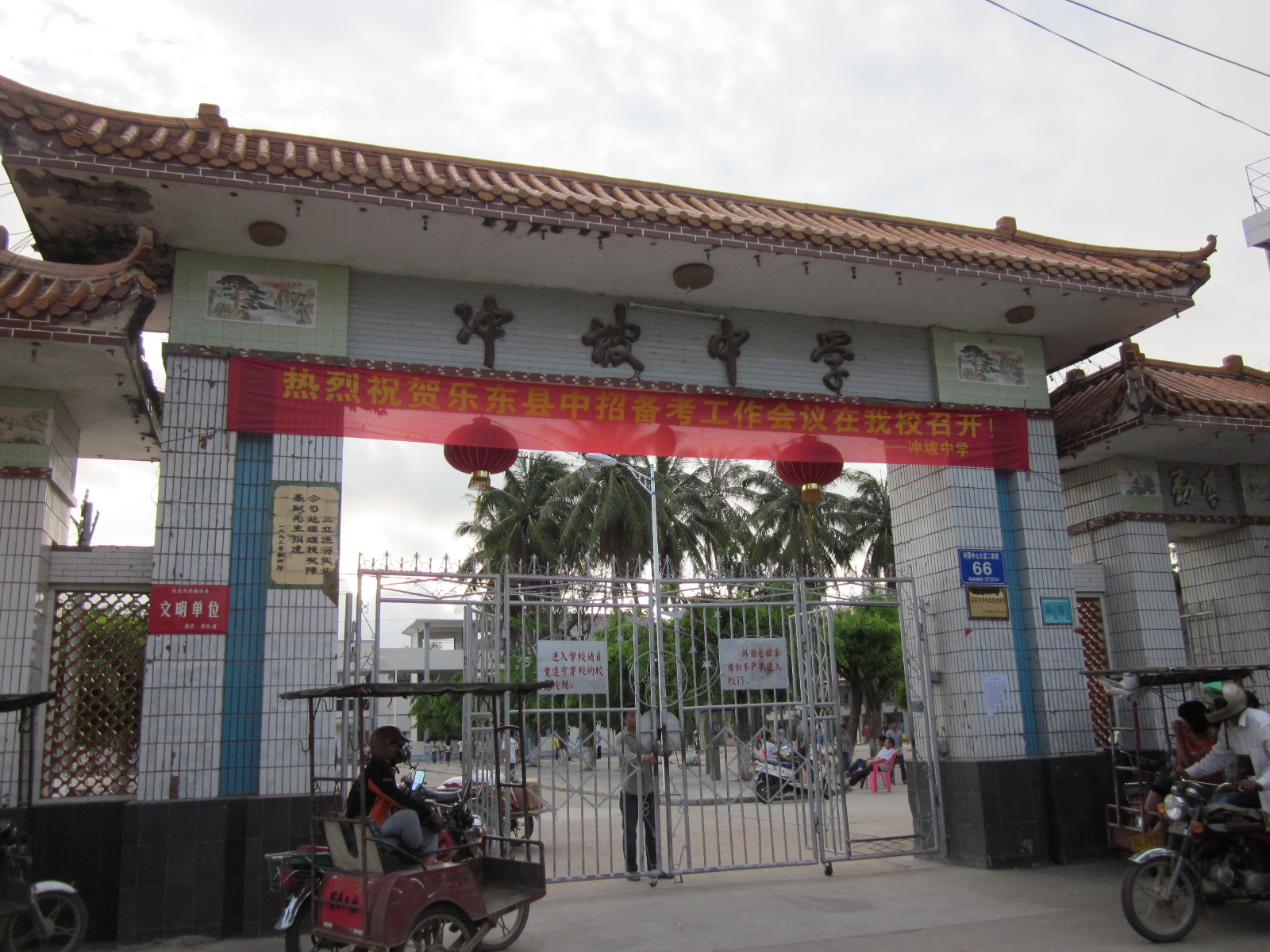
Chongpo Middle School
