= Sanya Tram =

Tramway system in Sanya, China

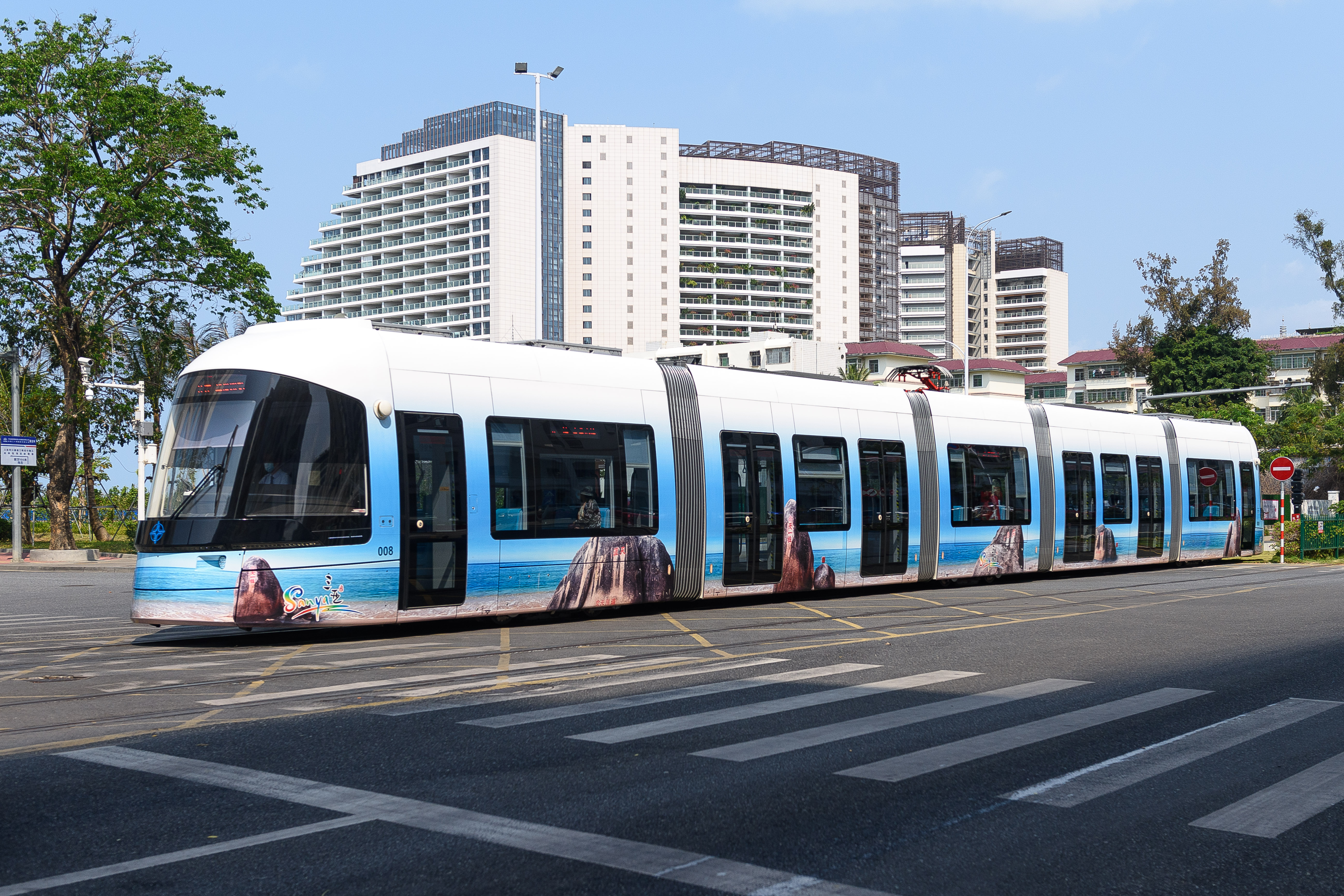
A tram approaching to Jiangang Rd. tram stop, which is the southernmost train station in China as of 2023

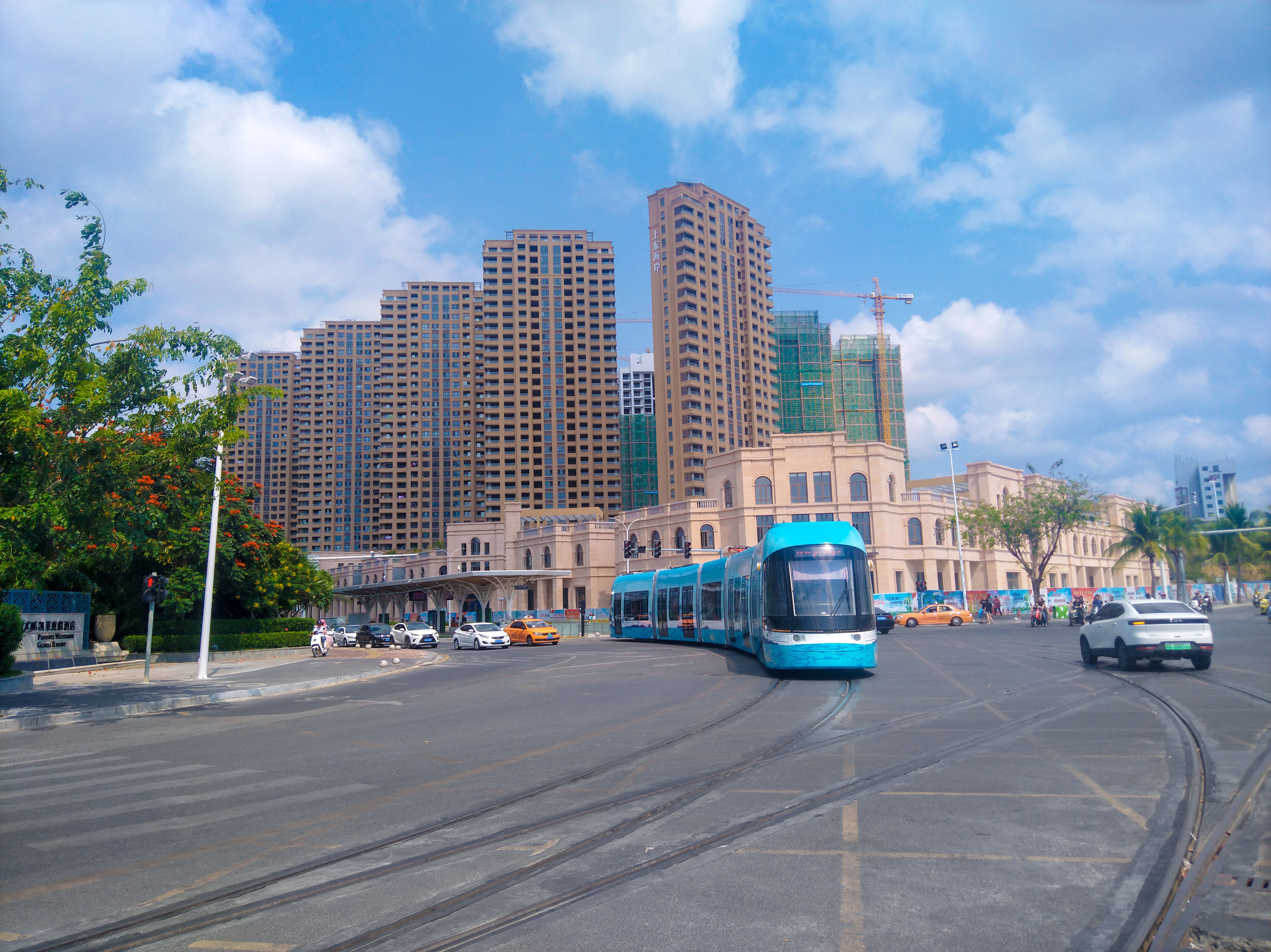
Sanya Tram in 2019

The Sanya Tram (Chinese: 三亚有轨电车) is a tram operating in Jiyang District, Sanya, Hainan, China.

== History ==
Construction began in July 2016. Trial runs began on 1 January 2019 with services serving six stops. The first line fully opened on 10 October 2020.

== Route ==
The first line is 8.37 km (5.20 mi) long with 15 stations and runs south from Sanya railway station to Jiangang Road station, in downtown Sanya. It takes about 35 minutes from one end to the other.

== Technology ==
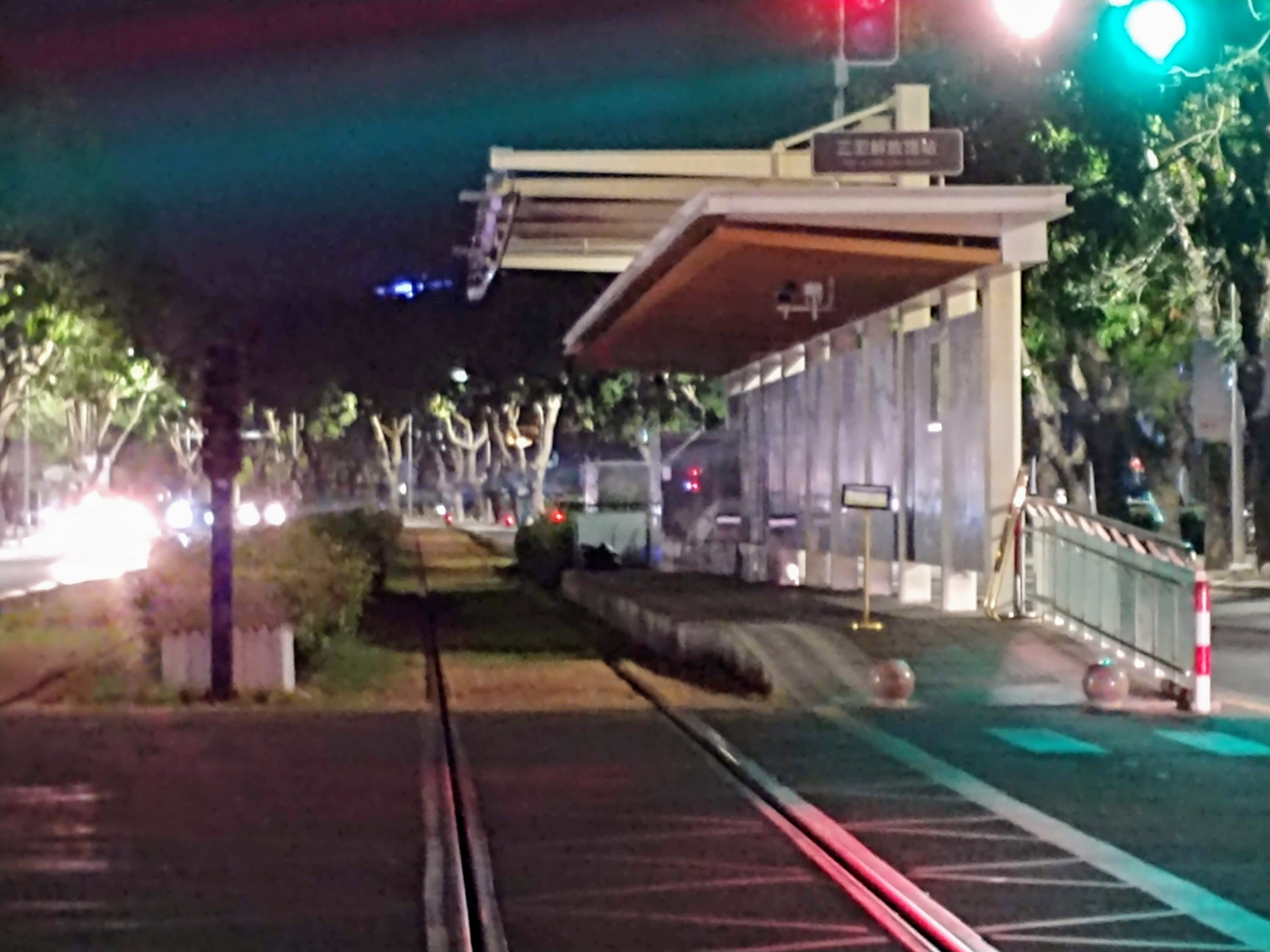
Overhead recharging system

The tram operates without overhead wires. Instead, the trams are charged by contacts above each stop.
