= Chahe, Hainan =

Chahe 叉河镇
- Town
- Location in Hainan
- Coordinates: 19°14′00″N 108°57′00″E
- Country: People's Republic of China
- Province: Hainan
- Autonomous county: Changjiang Li Autonomous County
- Time zone: UTC+8 (China Standard)

Chahe (Chinese: 叉河; pinyin: Chāhé) is a town in Changjiang Li Autonomous County, China's Hainan province. As of 2020, it administers Chahe Residential Community and the following seven villages:

- Chahe Village
- Pai'an Village (排岸村)
- Tang Village (唐村)
- Laohong Village (老宏村)
- Laoyangdi Village (老羊地村)
- Kantou Village (坎头村)
- Hongyang Village (红阳村)

Chahe Railway Station, a junction on the Hainan Western Ring Railway, is located in town.
