= Guangdong–Hainan railway =

Railway line in China

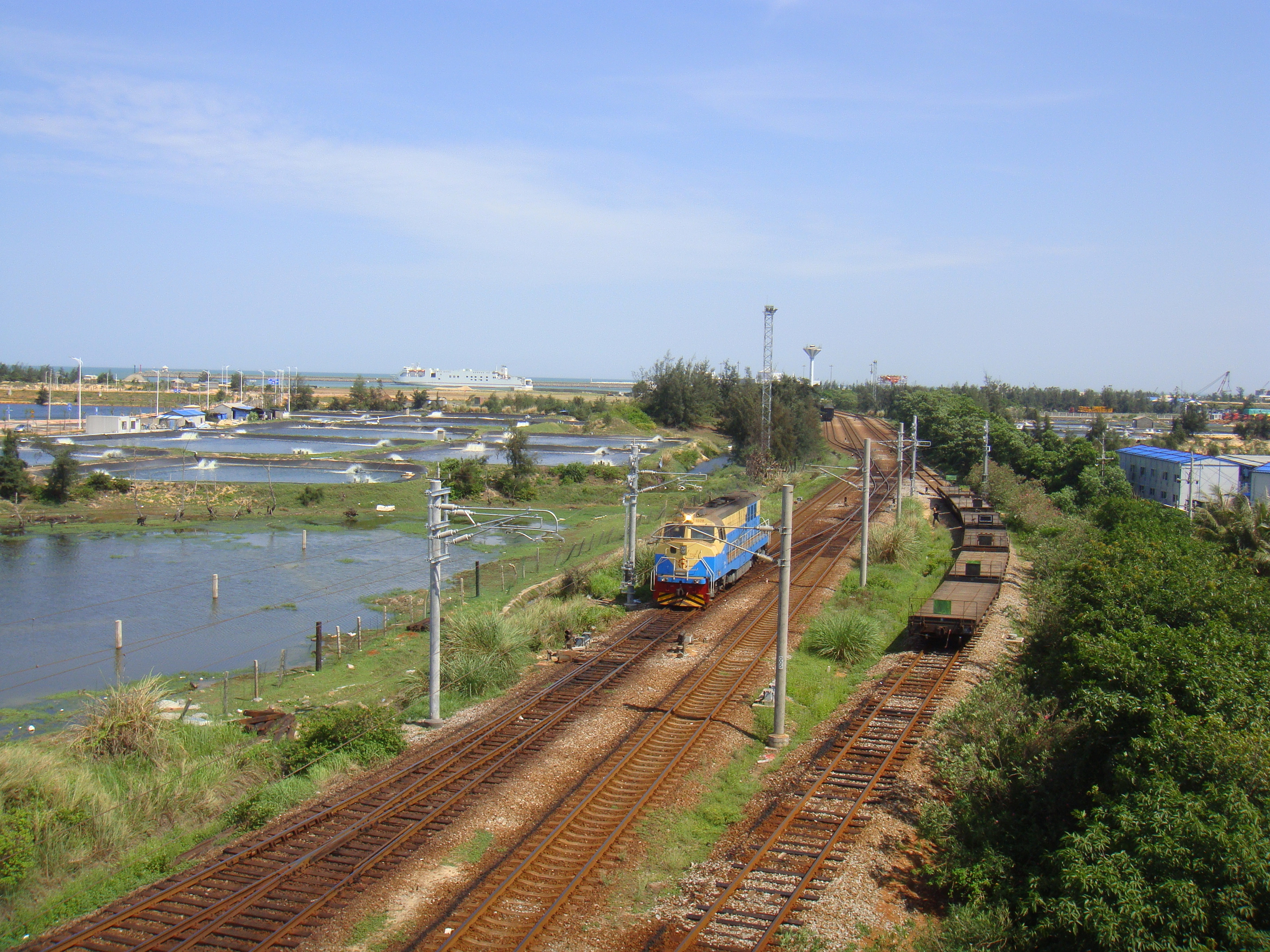
- Railway between Haikou railway station and South Port

Overview
- Other name: Yuehai railway
- Native name: 粤海铁路
- Status: Operational
- Owner: China Railway
- Locale: South China between Guangdong and Hainan
- Termini: Zhanjiang West; Haikou
- Stations: 3

Service
- Type: Train ferry connection
- Services: 1
- Operator: CR Guangzhou
- Rolling stock: CR DF4DD

History
- Opened: 7 January 2003

Technical
- Number of tracks: 4
- Character: Sea crossing
- Track gauge: 1,435 mm (4 ft 8 1/2 in)
- Electrification: 25 kV AC overhead line

The Guangdong–Hainan railway or Yuehai railway (Chinese: 粤海铁路; pinyin: Yuè-Hǎi tiělù) is a railway that operates from Haikou railway station in Hainan, via South Port, a few hundred metres north-west on the coast, and the Qiongzhou Strait ferry, to Zhanjiang, at the tip of the Leizhou Peninsula in Guangdong, and then north into Guangdong.

== Yuehai Railway Ferry ==
The Yuehai Railway Ferry (Chinese: 粤海铁路轮渡; pinyin: Yuè-Hǎi tiělù lúndù) is a train and vehicle ferry connecting the Chinese provinces of Guangdong and Hainan. The ferry service runs across the Qiongzhou Strait, between Zhanjiang and South Port, just north-west of Haikou railway station.

When ferries containing railway cars arrive at South Port from Zhanjiang, passengers not travelling in railway cars disembark. The passenger cars are run off the ferries and a locomotive is attached, which takes the train to the Haikou railway station. There, the passengers exit the cars and leave the station, or they can connect to the Hainan eastern ring high-speed railway. Freight trains also use the ferry service and travel through Haikou railway station onto the Hainan western ring railway, and to other locations in Hainan, such as Dongfang.

The line has operated since January 2003, carrying both freight and passenger trains, enabling direct train service between the mainland and the cities of Haikou and Sanya on Hainan Island. In 2010, two ferry boats were in operation: Yuehai No. 1 and Yuehai No. 2. The third boat, Yuehai No. 3, was launched in Tianjin in September 2010.

Yuehai No. 3 and the fourth boat, Yuehai No. 4, entered revenue service with the ferry company on February 1, 2013. The two 23,000-ton vessels are 188 meters (616 ft 10 in) long, 23 meters (75 ft) wide and 15.3 meters (50 ft 2 in) in total height; they have a 5.6 m (18 ft 4 in) draft. The vessels carry rail cars at the lower deck and cars on the upper deck; there are passenger compartments as well. They travel at the speed of up to 17 knots (31 km/h; 20 mph).

== Gallery ==
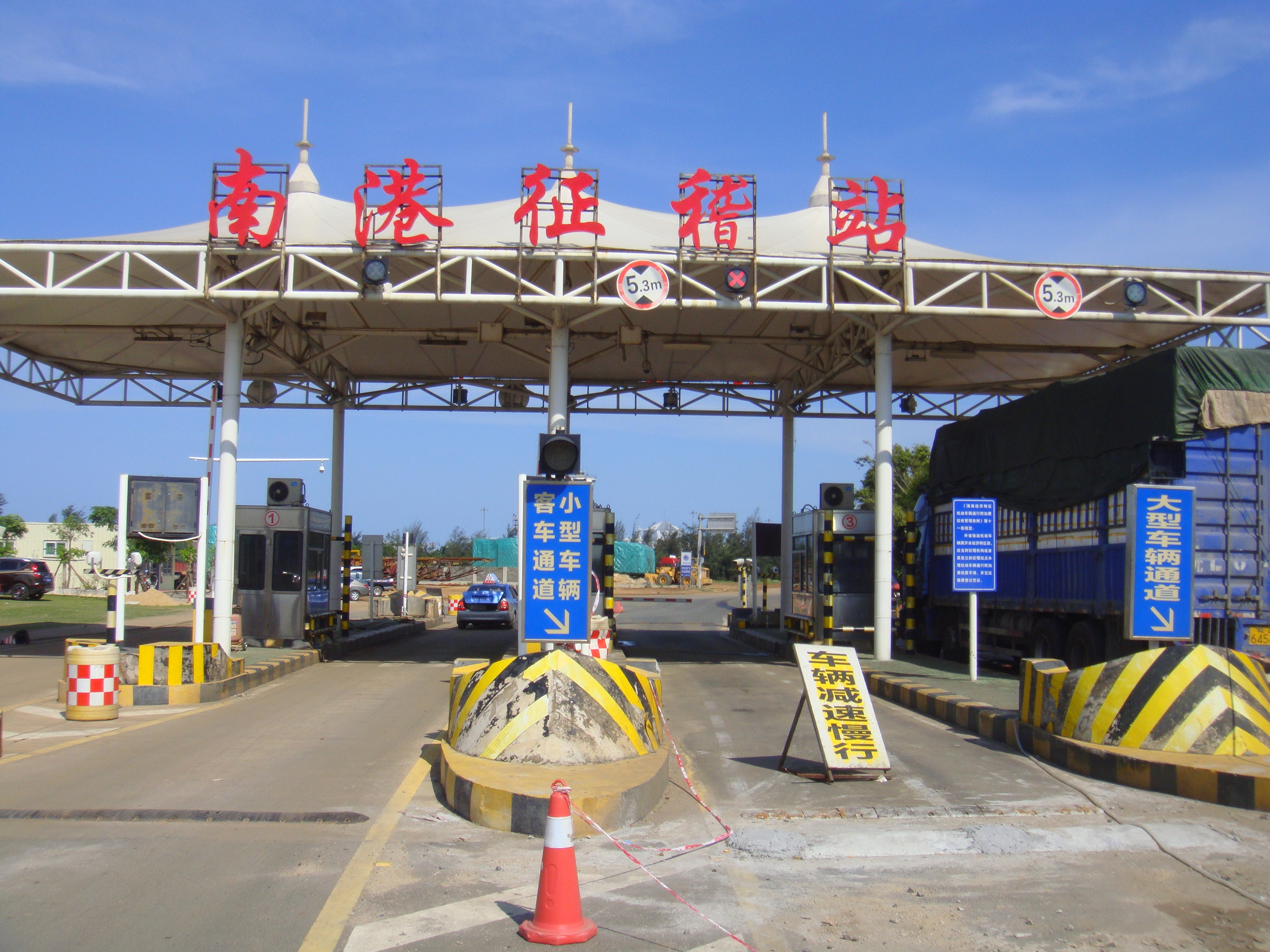
Main entrance road with toll booths

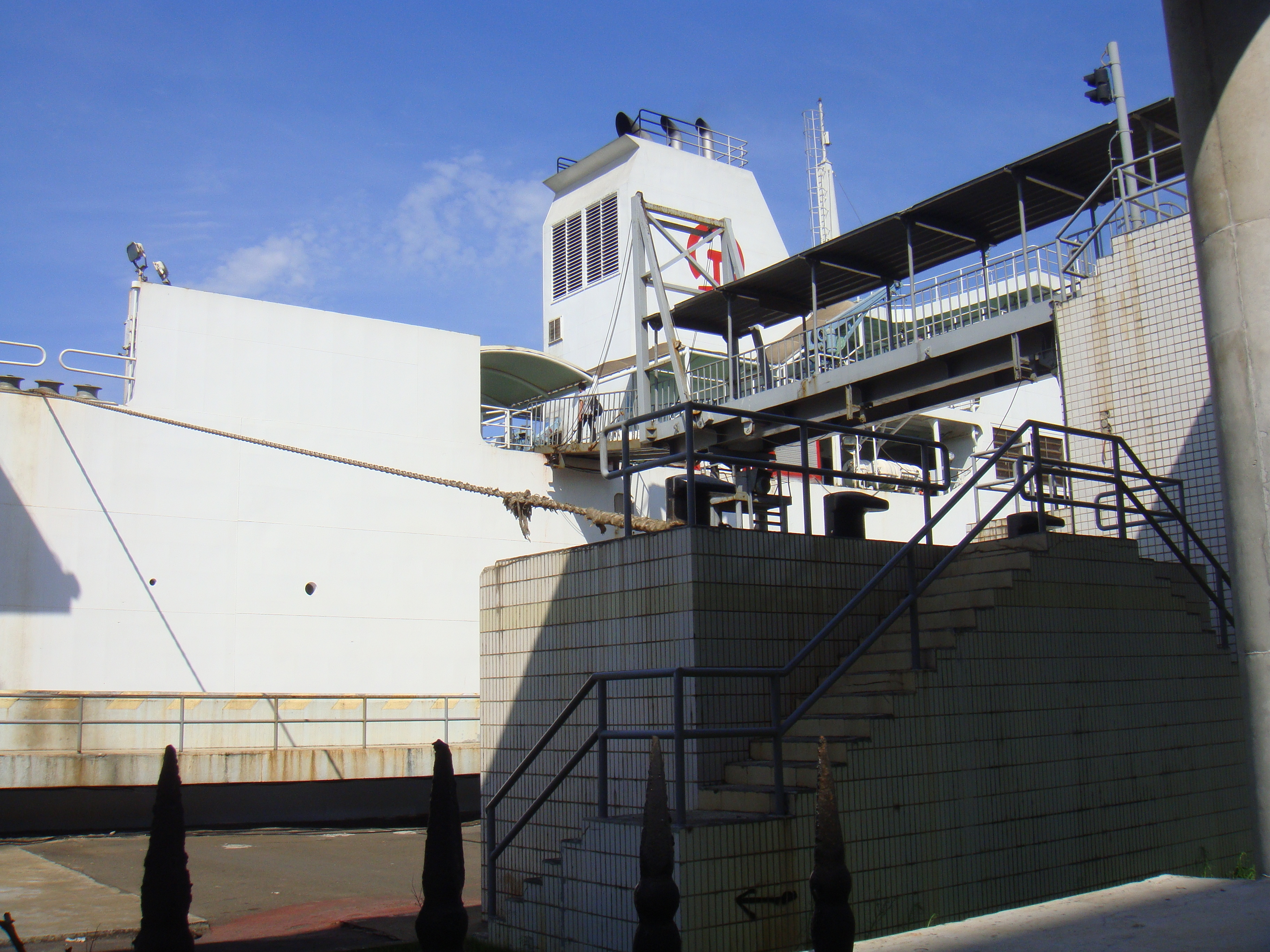
Walkway for pedestrian access to ferry

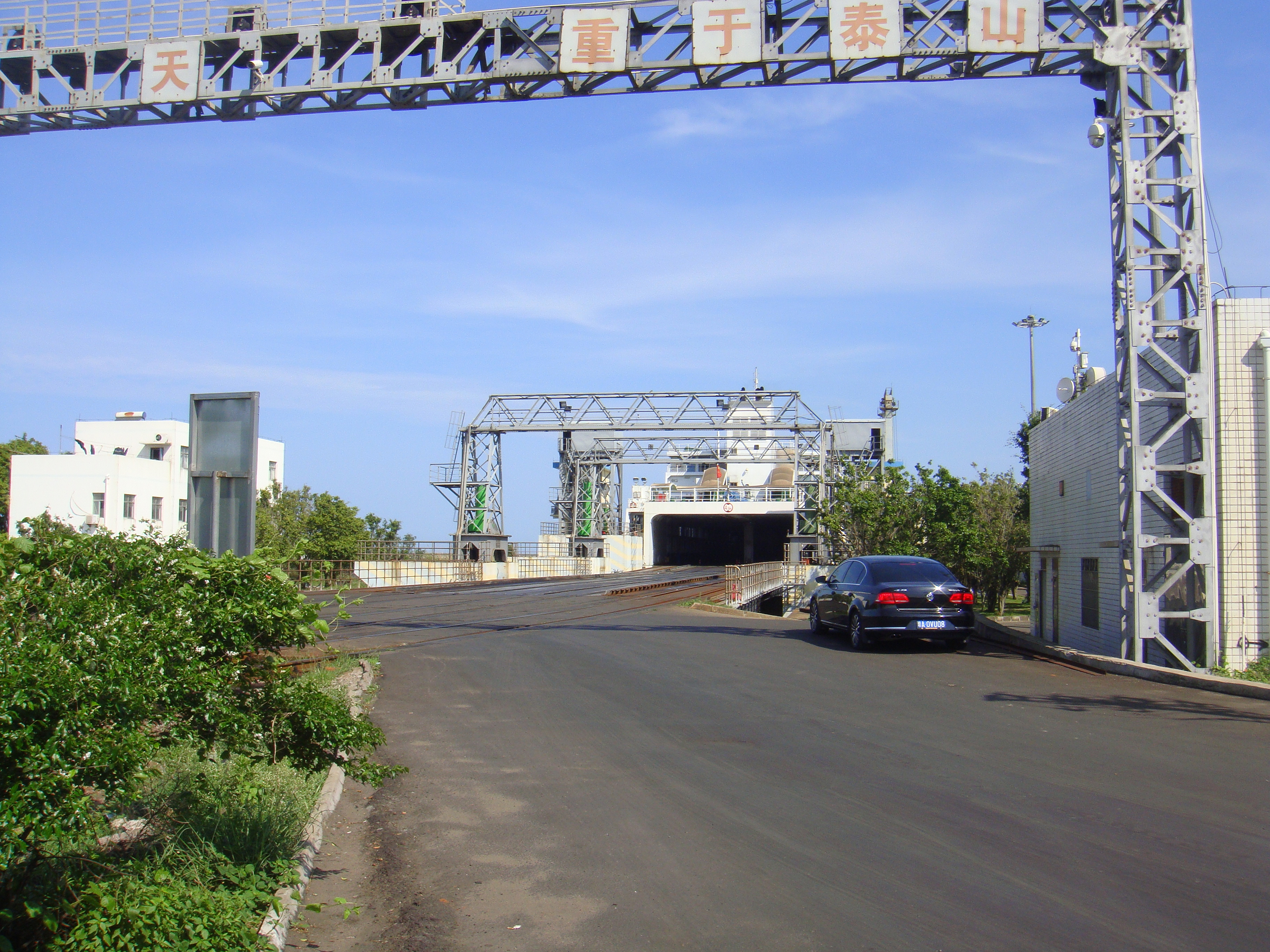
Ferry and rail line

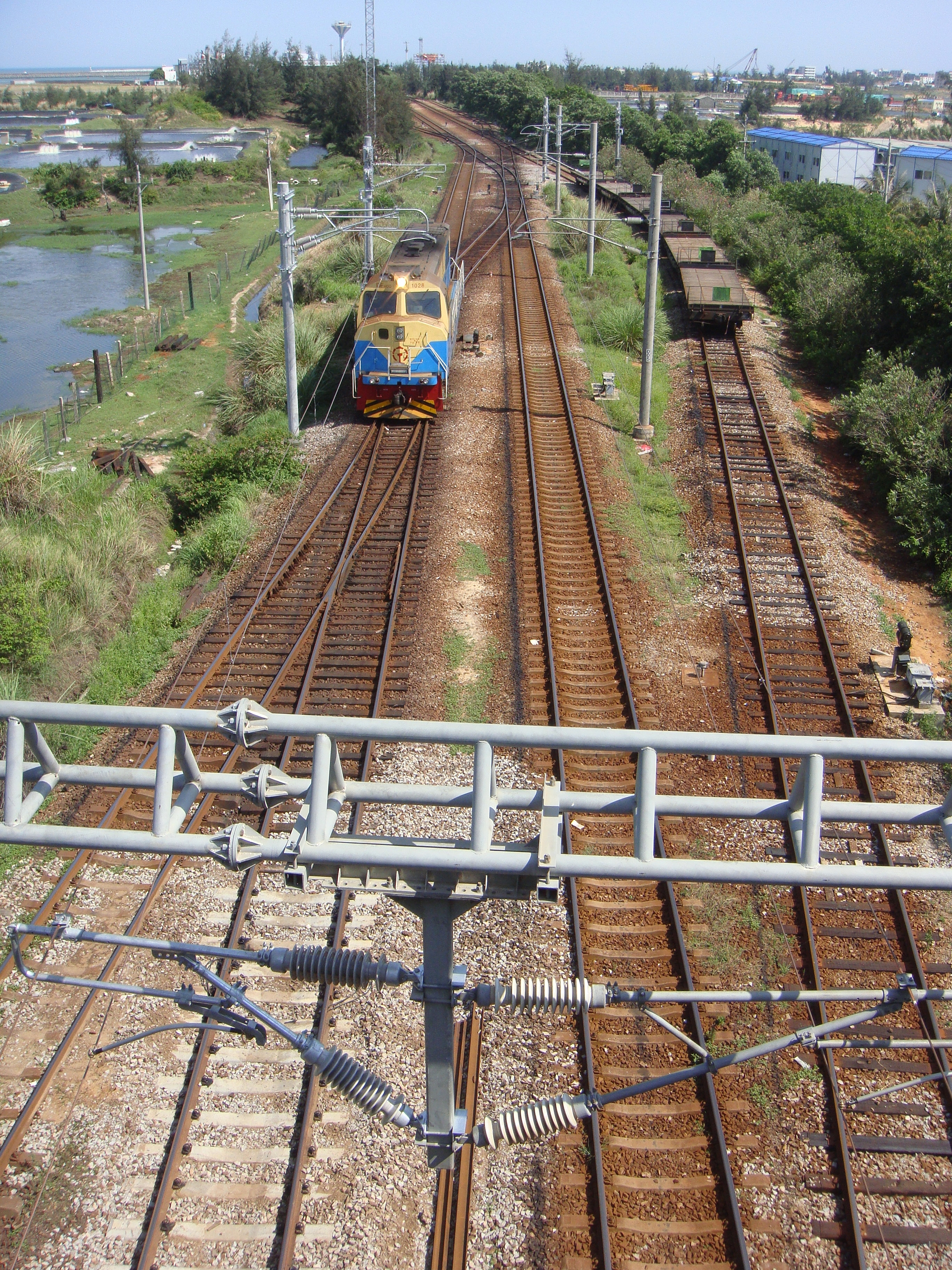
Rail line that brings trains to the Haikou railway station

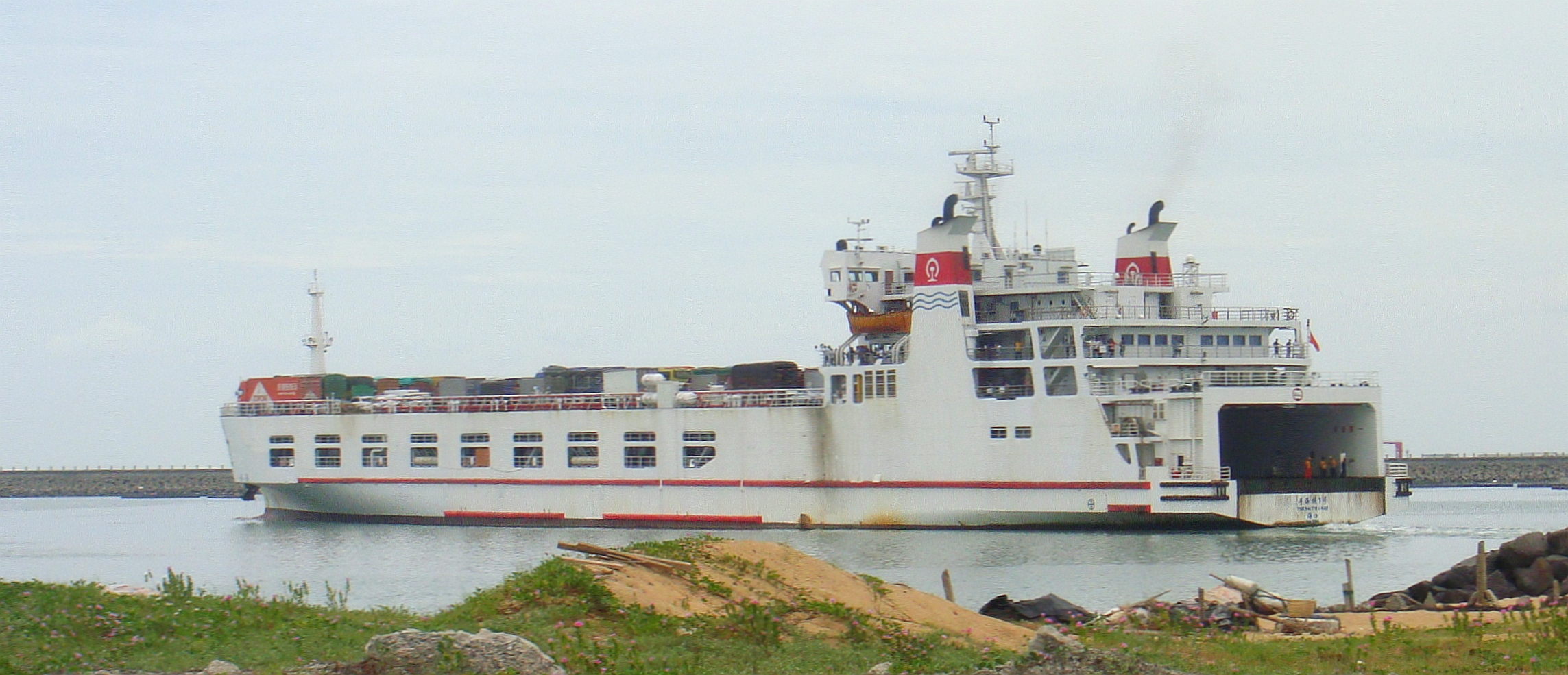
Ferry Yue Hai Tie 1 Hao leaving South Port
