= Hainan western ring high-speed railway =

Railway line in China

Hainan Western Ring HSR
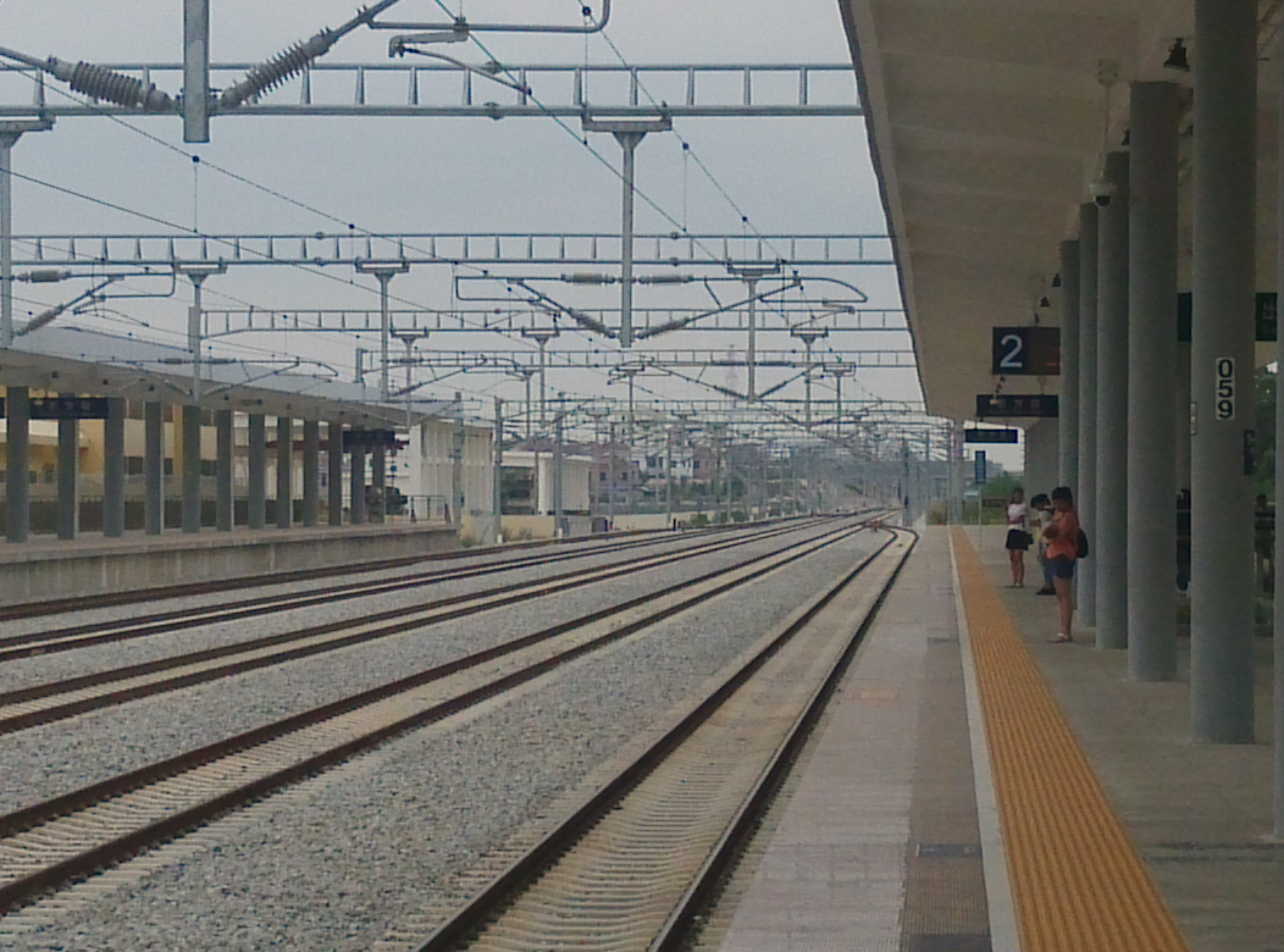
- Hainan Western Ring HSR tracks at the Dongfang railway station

Overview
- Native name: 海南西环高速铁路
- Status: Operational
- Owner: CR Guangzhou
- Locale: Western Hainan
- Termini: Haikou; Sanya
- Stations: 15

Service
- Type: High-speed railway, Loop line
- System: China Railway High-speed
- Services: 1
- Operator: Hainan Railway Company Limited of China Railway Guangzhou Group

History
- Opened: 30 December 2015

Technical
- Line length: 344 km (214 mi)
- Number of tracks: 2
- Character: Elevated
- Track gauge: 1,435 mm (4 ft 8 1/2 in) standard gauge
- Electrification: 25 kV 50 Hz AC (Overhead line)
- Operating speed: 200 km/h (125 mph)

The Hainan western ring high-speed railway (Chinese: 海南西环高速铁路; pinyin: Hǎinán xī huán gāosù tiělù, often abbreviated [海南]西环高铁; [Hǎinán] Xī huán gāotiě) is a high-speed railway operated by China Railway Guangzhou Group in Hainan Province. It started operation on 30 December 2015.

The 344 km (214 mi) long rail line runs along the western half of the island's coastline, from Haikou railway station in the north to Sanya railway station. At its two end points, it connects with the existing Hainan eastern ring high-speed railway (opened in 2010), thus forming a high-speed railway ring spanning 653 km long, around the entire island, as well as the world's first and only circular high-speed railway line. The circular closed loop allows passengers to travel along the entire circumference of the island in approximately 3 hours at the shortest time, and connects all twelve coastal cities and counties, as well as having additional stops at Haikou and Sanya airports.

Unlike the Hainan eastern ring high-speed railway, which runs along the coast previously not served by railway (other than at its end points, Haikou and Sanya), the Western Ring high-speed railway roughly parallels the conventional-speed Hainan Western Ring Railway, which has connected Haikou and Sanya since 2005.

== History ==
The Hainan western ring railway was constructed in two stages.

The first short section connects the existing Sanya railway station with the new Phoenix Airport railway station, 10 km (6.2 mi) to the west. The section has one intermediate station, Sanya West railway station (三亚西站). The construction work on this section (凤三段) was planned to be completed by the end of 2014.

On the rest of the railway - the much longer section from Sanya Phoenix Airport to Haikou - progress was only in its preliminary phase in 2012. Property was acquired, and demolition was conducted. According to the construction plans, 22,300 mu (14.8 km^{2} or 5.7 sq mi) of land will be permanently used by the railway and associated facilities, and another 8,800 mu (5.9 km^{2} or 2.3 sq mi) was temporary used during construction. 87,000 m^{2} of housing was demolished. The necessary demolitions were completed by the end of 2013.

In November 2015, the first test train travelled on the 344 km Western ring high-speed railway, and completed the 652 km circular railway loop around the island. The western ring high-speed railway became officially operational and open to the public in December 2015.

== Stations ==
As of 2018, many of the stations were not in use. The list below names the settlements where the stations are located. They will be named correspondingly.

- Haikou railway station
- Laochengzhen railway station
- Fushanzhen railway station
- Lingao South railway station
- Yintan railway station
- Baimajing railway station
- Haitou railway station
- Qiziwan railway station
- Dongfang railway station
- Jinyuewan railway station
- Jianfeng railway station
- Huangliu railway station
- Ledong railway station
- Yazhou railway station
- Phoenix Airport railway station
- Sanya railway station

== Rolling stock ==
- CRH1A-A 8-car sets (since 30 December 2015)
- CR300-AF 8-car sets (since 1 February 2021)
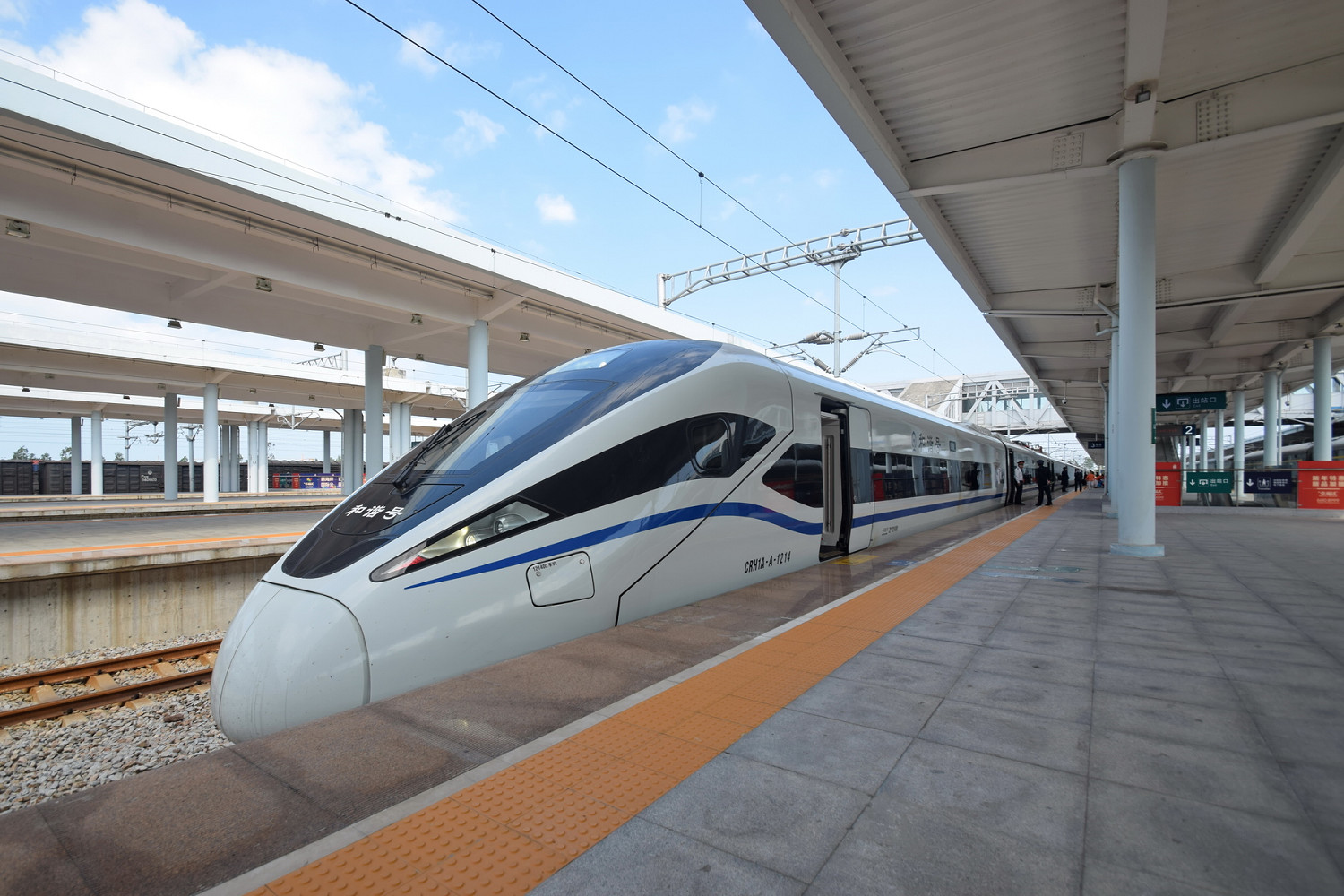
CRH1A-A trainset

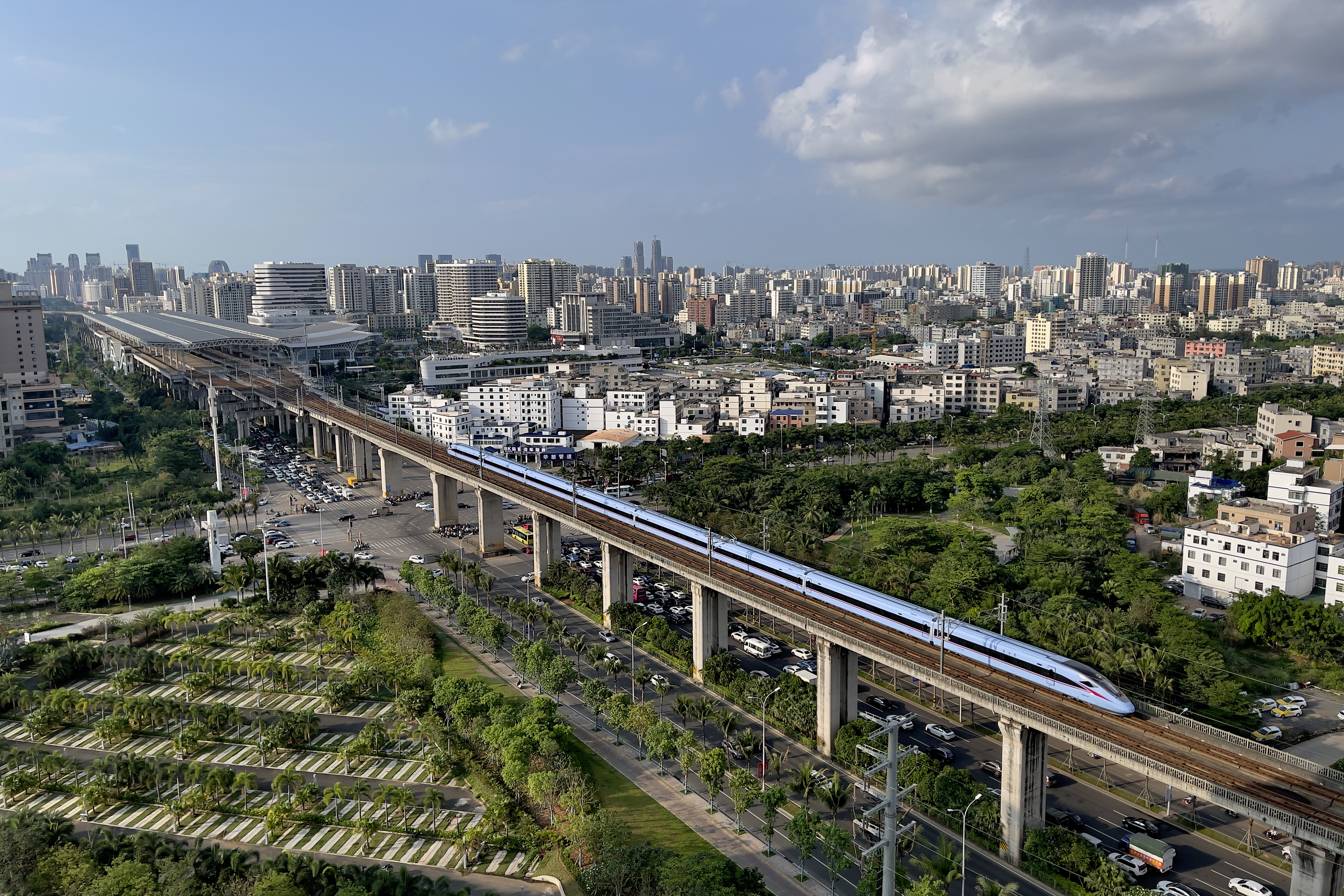
CR300AF trainset

== See also ==
- Hainan eastern ring high-speed railway, the eastern half of the high-speed railway in Hainan Province
- Hainan western ring railway, the conventional-speed railway
