= Hainan western ring railway =

Railway System

Hainan Western Ring Railway
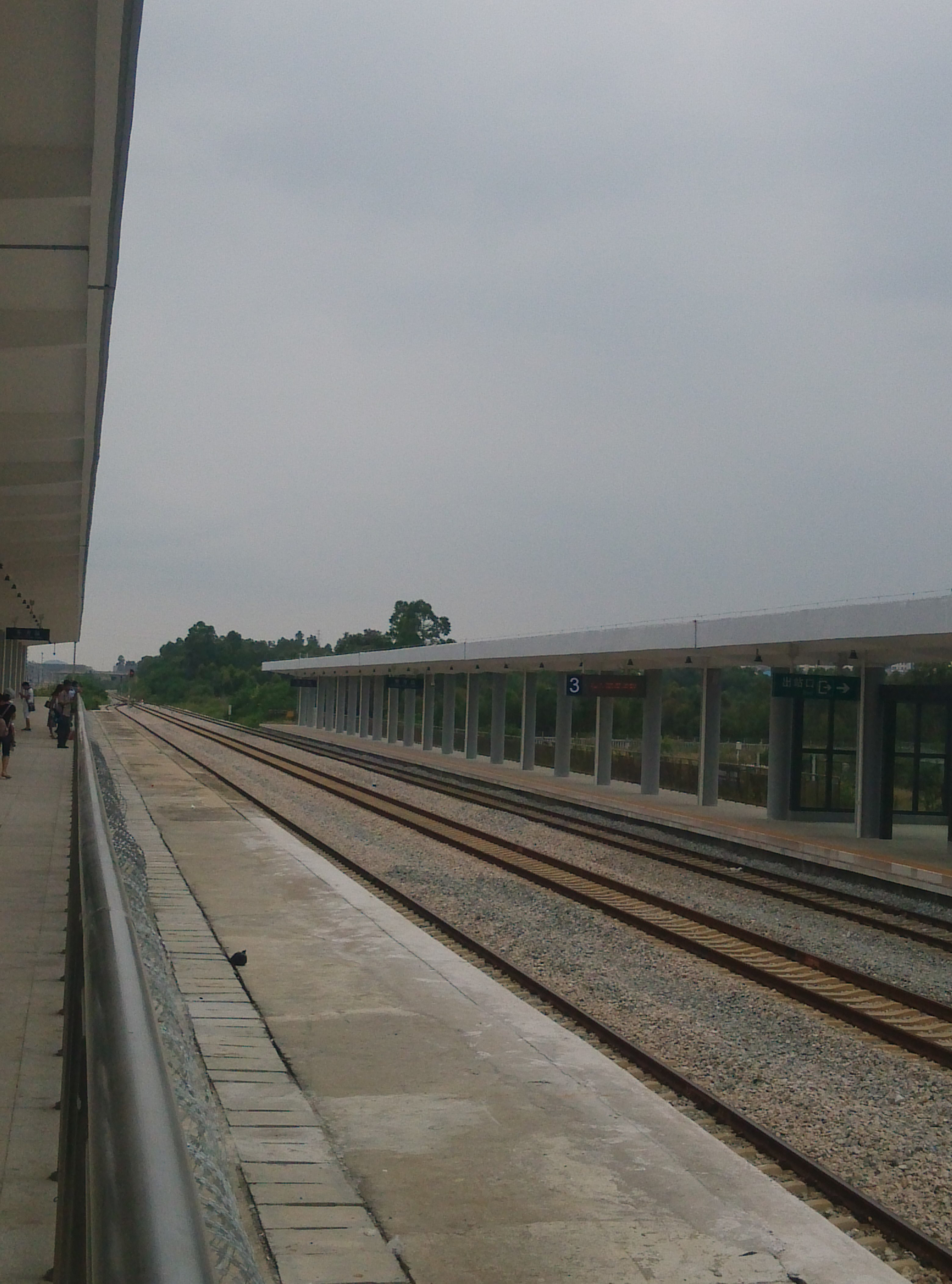
- Hainan Western Ring railway at the Dongfang railway station

Overview
- Native name: 海南西环铁路
- Status: Mostly freight services
- Owner: China Railway
- Locale: Western Hainan
- Termini: Haikou; Sanya
- Continues from: Guangdong–Hainan railway
- Stations: 6

Service
- Type: Heavy rail
- Services: Only for cross-sea train route
- Operator: CR Guangzhou

History
- Work began: March 1940
- Opened: 7 April 1942
- Completed: 23 March 1942

Technical
- Line length: 363.8 km (226.1 mi)
- Num of tracks: 1
- Character: At-grade
- Track gauge: 1,435 mm (4 ft 8 1/2 in) standard gauge
- Old gauge: 3 ft 6 in (1,067 mm)

The Hainan western ring railway (Chinese: 海南西环铁路; pinyin: Hǎinán xīhuán tiělù) is a standard-gauge railway running along the coast of the western half of Hainan Island in South China. It connects the provincial capital Haikou on the island's north coast with Sanya, the major city on Hainan's south coast. The rail line is 363.8 km long; its terminals are Haikou railway station and Sanya railway station. Cargo trains enter this railway from Zhanjiang, Guangdong, at the South Port of the Guangdong–Hainan Railway.

The Hainan Western Ring Railway has a long history, some of its sections dating to World War II. It has achieved its present form upon completing a major expansion and upgrade project in 2005. After that, the Hainan Western Ring Railway (including a few minor side branches) remained the island's only railway until the opening of the Hainan Eastern Ring high-speed Railway in 2010, which connects to the Western Ring at both endpoints.

As of 2019, the Hainan Western Ring Railway is primarily used for freight and has limited passenger service. The new Hainan Western Ring High-Speed Railway, primarily for passenger service, has been constructed along a fairly similar but slightly shorter (344 km) route.

== History ==
The first railways on Hainan, which were later incorporated into the Hainan Western Ring Railway, were constructed during the Japanese occupation of the island during WWII. One of these lines connected the iron ore mine at Shilu with the Basuo Harbor on the island's west coast. The 53-km line was built in 1940–1942 to the Japanese 3 ft 6 in (1,067 mm) gauge, using the labor of some 50,000 Chinese workers. It was opened to traffic on April 7, 1942, but largely destroyed by a typhoon the same summer. After the typhoon, the line was rebuilt more capitalized and reopened in May 1943.

Another line constructed during the Japanese occupation ran along the island's southwestern coast, from Basuo to the Anyou port facilities (18°13′00″N 109°33′00″E) in Sanya, via Huangliu and Lingtou (18°41′15″N 108°42′15″E). This line was opened in March 1943.

After the Communists took over Hainan in April 1950, the narrow-gauge railways weren't used anymore, as they had been damaged beyond repair.

The Shilu–Basuo line was rehabilitated in 1956–57, and converted to China's standard gauge in 1971. Two sections of the former Anyou–Basuo line were rebuilt as well: the 108-km-long Anyou–Huangliu section was rebuilt, on standard gauge, in 1958–59, the 18-km Huangliu–Lingtou section was restored in 1960. Together, these two sections formed the Anyou–Lingtou line, which opened on January 1, 1961. However, in 1965 the Huangliu–Lingtou section was closed again, because its main customer, the Jianfengling forestry enterprise (尖峰岭林场), stopped shipping timber by rail.

In 1984–85, the Huangliu-Lingtou section, as well as the long-abandoned Lingtou–Basuo section, were restored, thus creating the standard-gauge Hainan western ring railway from Shilu (Changjiang county seat) to Anyou (in Sanya).

In 2004, the railway from Haikou to Chahe Station (on the Basuo–Shilu line, near Shilu) was completed, making the short Chahe-Shilu section into a secondary dead-end branch. This finally gave the Hainan Western Ring Railway its modern configuration from Haikou to Sanya. In the same year (2004), the Guangdong–Hainan Rail Ferry started operating, integrating the Hainan Western Ring Railway into China's national railway network. The ferry's Hainan terminal is adjacent to Haikou railway station (which is located quite a ways west of Haikou city proper).

In 2006–2007, the railway was thoroughly upgraded. In many places, it was rerouted to reduce the maximum incline to 1% and increase the minimum curve radius to 800–1600 m. This also straightened the railway, reducing its total length by 27 km. Now it can run freight trains up to 10,000 tons in weight and support (passenger) trains' speeds up to 120–160 km/h (depending on the section). Provisions were made to make it possible to electrify the railway in the future.

In 2007, the reopened railway started receiving passenger trains from China's mainland; after crossing from Guangdong to Haikou on the ferry, they would continue along the entire length of the Hainan western ring to Sanya. As of 2012, however, most of the trains from the mainland terminate in Haikou, where the passengers can transfer to the new Hainan Eastern Ring high-speed Railway. Now only one passenger train (Z201/Z202 from Beijing West) continues along the western ring to Sanya, with a stop in Dongfang (Basuo).
