= Haikou railway station =

Railway station in Haikou, China

Haikou 海口
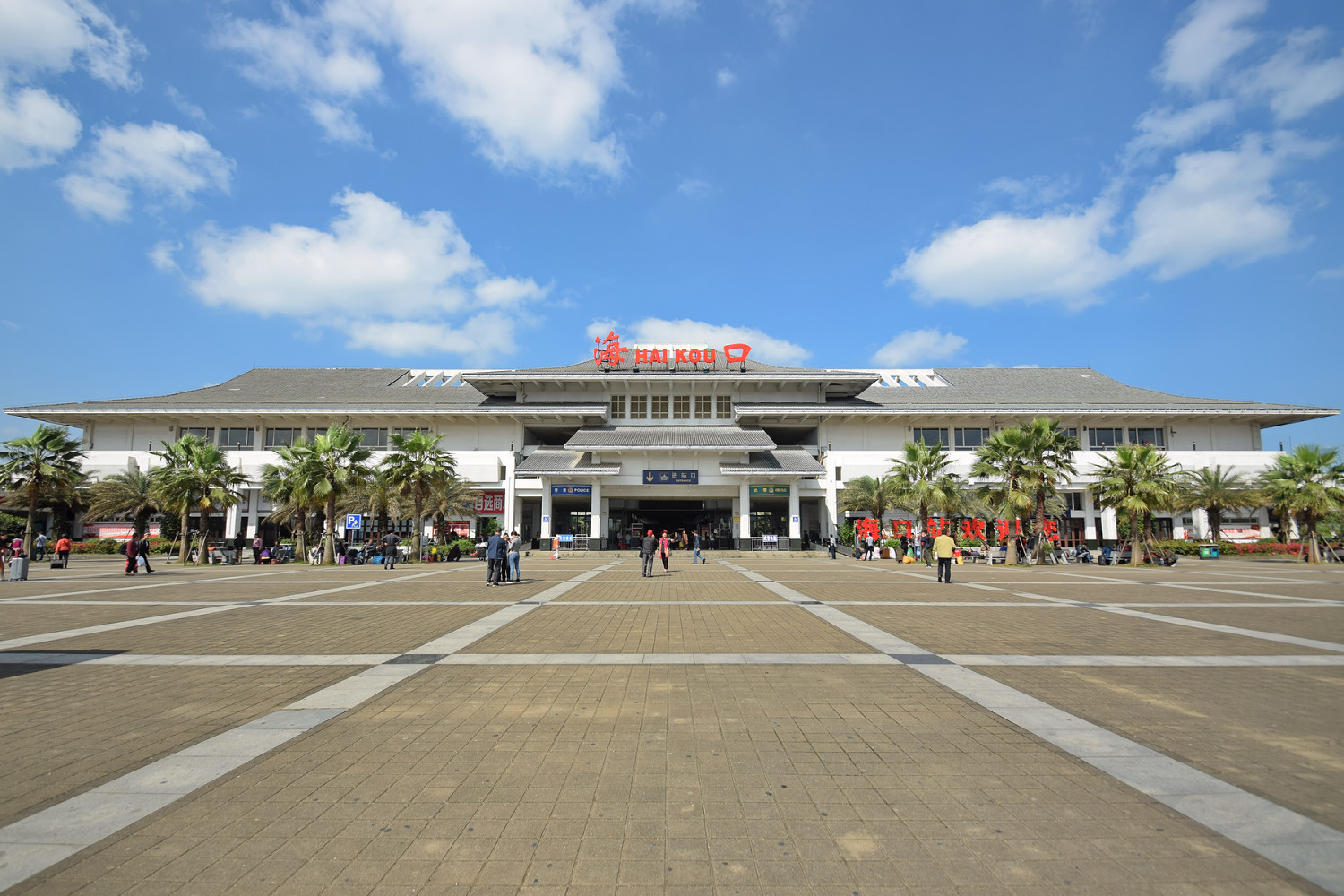
- Front of station in 2018

General information
- Location: Haikou, Hainan, China
- Coordinates: 20°01′46″N 110°09′27″E
- Lines: Hainan eastern ring high-speed railway; Hainan western ring railway; Hainan western ring high-speed railway; Guangdong–Hainan railway
Location

Haikou railway station (Chinese: 海口站) is the northern terminal of the Hainan eastern ring high-speed railway, the Hainan western ring high-speed railway, and the Hainan western ring railway. It is located a few hundred metres southeast of South Port, the Hainan terminal of the Guangdong–Hainan railway, in the far western suburbs of Haikou City.

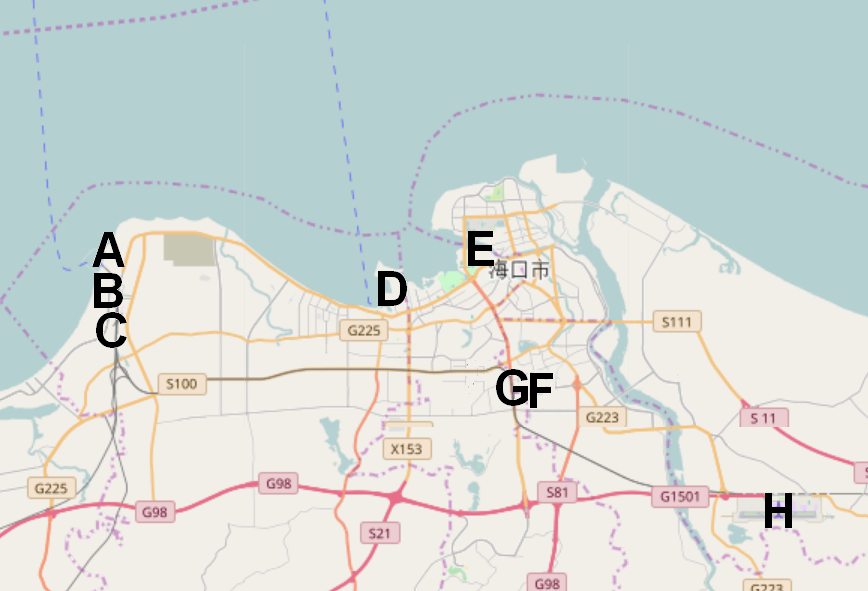
Main transportation hubs in Haikou: A: Haikou Port New Seaport; B: South Port; C: Haikou railway station; D: Haikou Xiuying Port; E: Haikou New Port; F: Haikou Transportation Center (main bus station); G: Haikou East railway station; H: Haikou Meilan International Airport

When ferries containing railway cars arrive from Zhanjiang, Guangdong at the South Port, railway cars are unloaded from the ferries onto tracks. An engine car attaches to these passenger cars. This then travels to the Haikou railway station. There, the passengers exit the railway cars and leave through the station. They may also connect to the Hainan eastern ring high-speed railway. Train cars carrying cargo also use this ferry service. These cars travel through the Haikou railway station, onto the Hainan western ring railway, to other locations in Hainan, such as Dongfang.

Administratively, the station is within Changliu Town (长流镇), in Xiuying District of Haikou City.

Preceding station	China Railway High-speed	Following station
Terminus	Hainan eastern ring high-speed railway	Changliu towards Sanya
Terminus	Hainan western ring high-speed railway	Laochengzhen towards Sanya
