= Sanya railway station =

Railway station in Sanya, China

Sanya 三亚
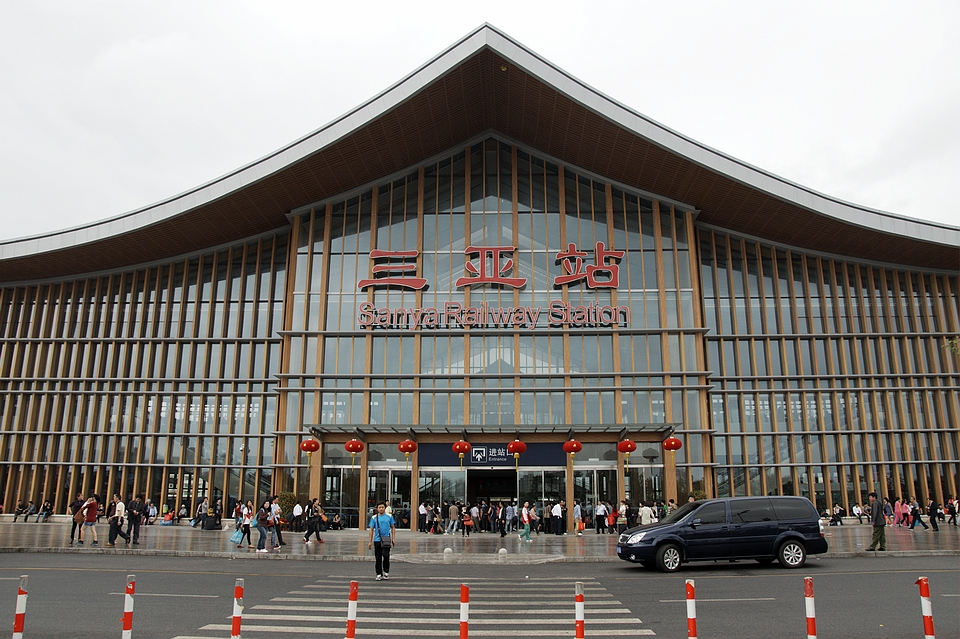

General information
- Coordinates: 18°17′55″N 109°29′19″E
- Lines: Hainan eastern ring high-speed railway; Hainan western ring railway; Hainan western ring high-speed railway
Location

Sanya railway station
- Traditional Chinese: 三亞火車站
- Simplified Chinese: 三亚火车站
Transcriptions
Standard Mandarin
- Hanyu Pinyin: Sānyà huǒchēzhàn

Sanya railway station is the station of the Hainan eastern ring high-speed railway and the Hainan western ring railway in Hainan Island of China. The southernmost railway station in China, it serves Sanya, the main city on the southern coast of Hainan.

Sanya Station is the (notionally) southern terminal of both the Hainan eastern ring high-speed railway and the Hainan western ring railway. (Geographically, the two railways come to the station from the east and west, as they follow the coast).

The station is located on the northern outskirts of Sanya City, some 5 km north of downtown. The Sanya Tram, fully opened on 10 October 2020, connects the railway station to downtown Sanya.

== History ==
The present-day Sanya railway station, situated on the northern outskirts of Sanya, was opened in April 2007. Previously, the city's railway station was located downtown (near 18°15′16″N 109°29′49″E), in a 1950s-era building. Based on Google Maps satellite view, it appears that the downtown railway branch has since been removed.

== Services ==
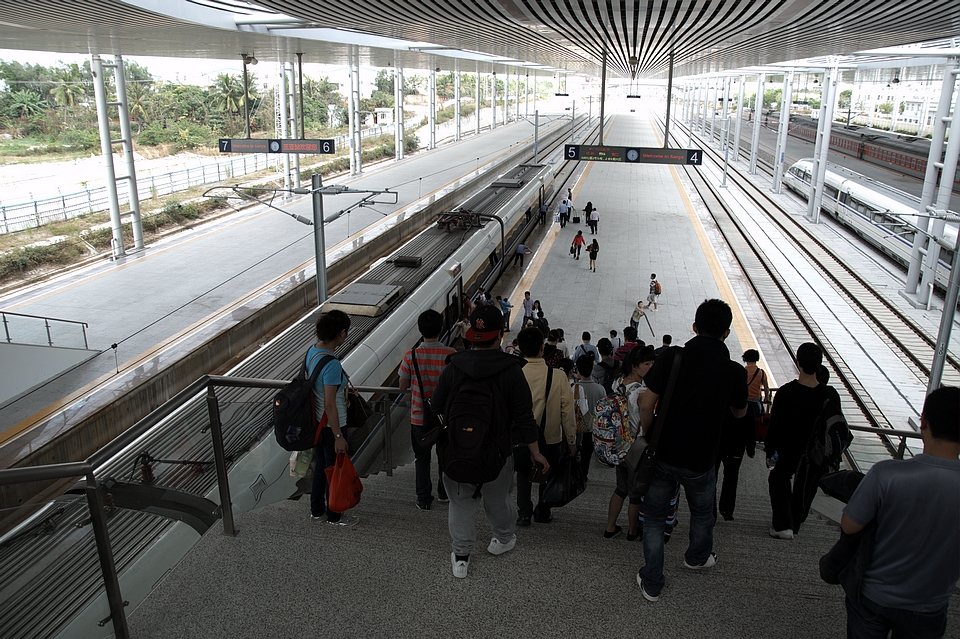
Platform

As of 2012, Sanya railway station functions primarily as the southern (Sanya) terminal for the D-series (EMU) trains of the Hainan Eastern Ring High-Speed Railway, which travel between Sanya and Haikou on a fairly frequent schedule.

In addition, Sanya Station is also the terminal for the "conventional" trains arriving to Sanya from Haikou along the Hainan Western Ring Railway. As of the late 2012, however, such trains are few; in fact, schedule sites reports only one such daily train, T201/T204 from Beijing West (via the Hainan Ferry and Haikou).

Sanya railway station is also the end point of the Hainan Western Ring High-Speed Railway, thus becoming the point where the high-speed rail ring around the island is closed. A short section of the Western High-Speed Ring, from Sanya railway station to the Phoenix Airport railway station 10 km to the west was completed first, by the end of 2014.

== Notes ==
Preceding station	China Railway High-speed	Following station
Yalongwan towards Haikou	Hainan eastern ring high-speed railway	Terminus
Phoenix Airport towards Haikou	Hainan western ring high-speed railway	Terminus
