= Haikou Xiuying Port =

Coordinates: 20°02′09″N 110°17′04″E

Haikou Xiuying Port 海口秀英港
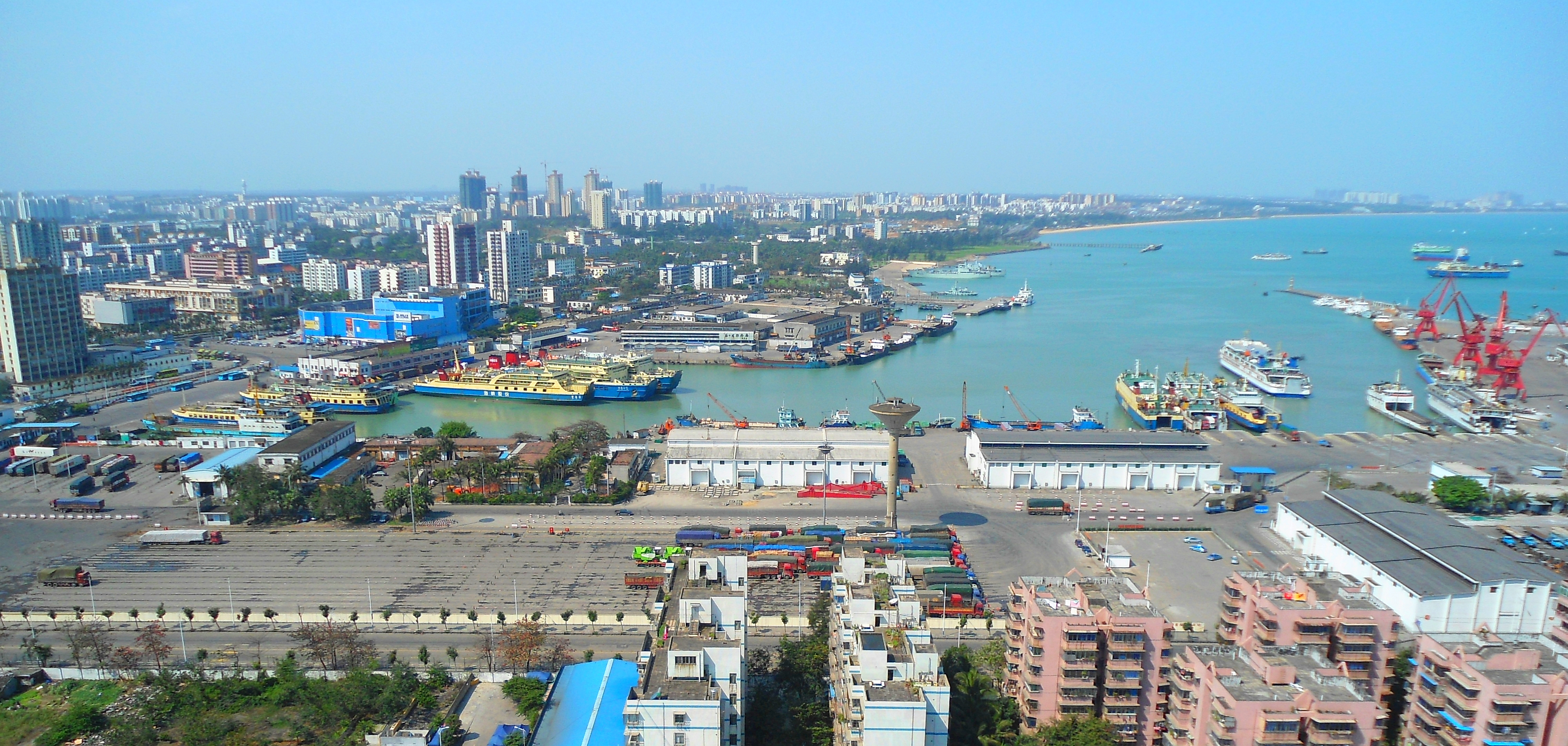
- Interactive map of Haikou Xiuying Port 海口秀英港

Location
- Country: China
- Location: Xiuying Bay, Haikou, Hainan Province

Details
- Owned by: Hainan Harbor & Shipping Holding Co., Ltd. (state-owned stock holding enterprise)

Haikou Xiuying Port (Chinese: 海口秀英港; pinyin: Hǎikǒu Xiùyīng Gǎng) is a seaport located 7 km west of Haikou New Port, in Haikou, Hainan, China.

Xiuying Port will relocate to an area several hundred metres north of South Port, the southern terminus of the Guangdong–Hainan Railway.

== Destinations ==
Destination	Terminal Name; English (Chinese)
Xuwen County, Zhanjiang	Hai'an Port (海安港)
Xuwen County, Zhanjiang	Hai'an New Port (海安新港)

== Gallery ==
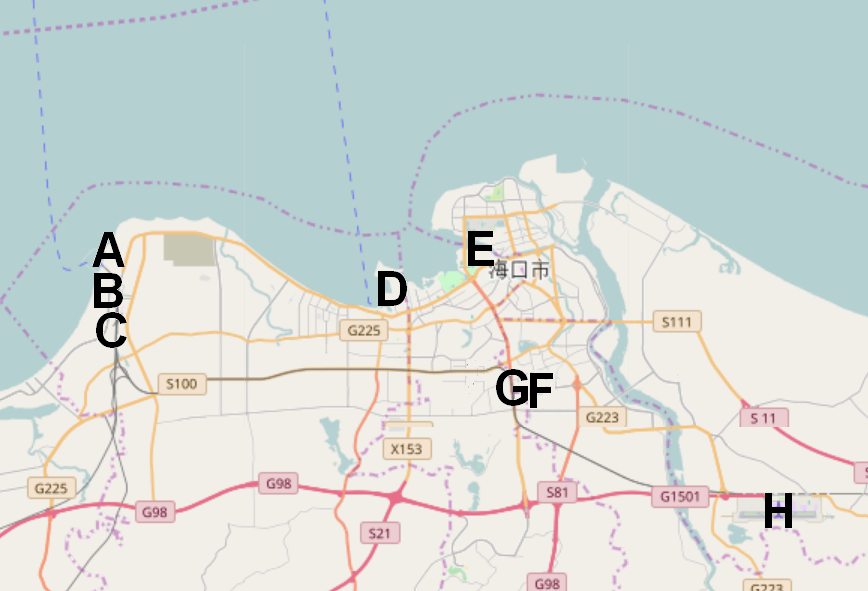
Main transportation hubs in Haikou: A: Haikou Port New Seaport; B: South Port; C: Haikou Railway Station; D: Haikou Xiuying Port; E: Haikou New Port; F: Haikou Transportation Center (main bus station); G: Haikou East Railway Station; H: Haikou Meilan International Airport

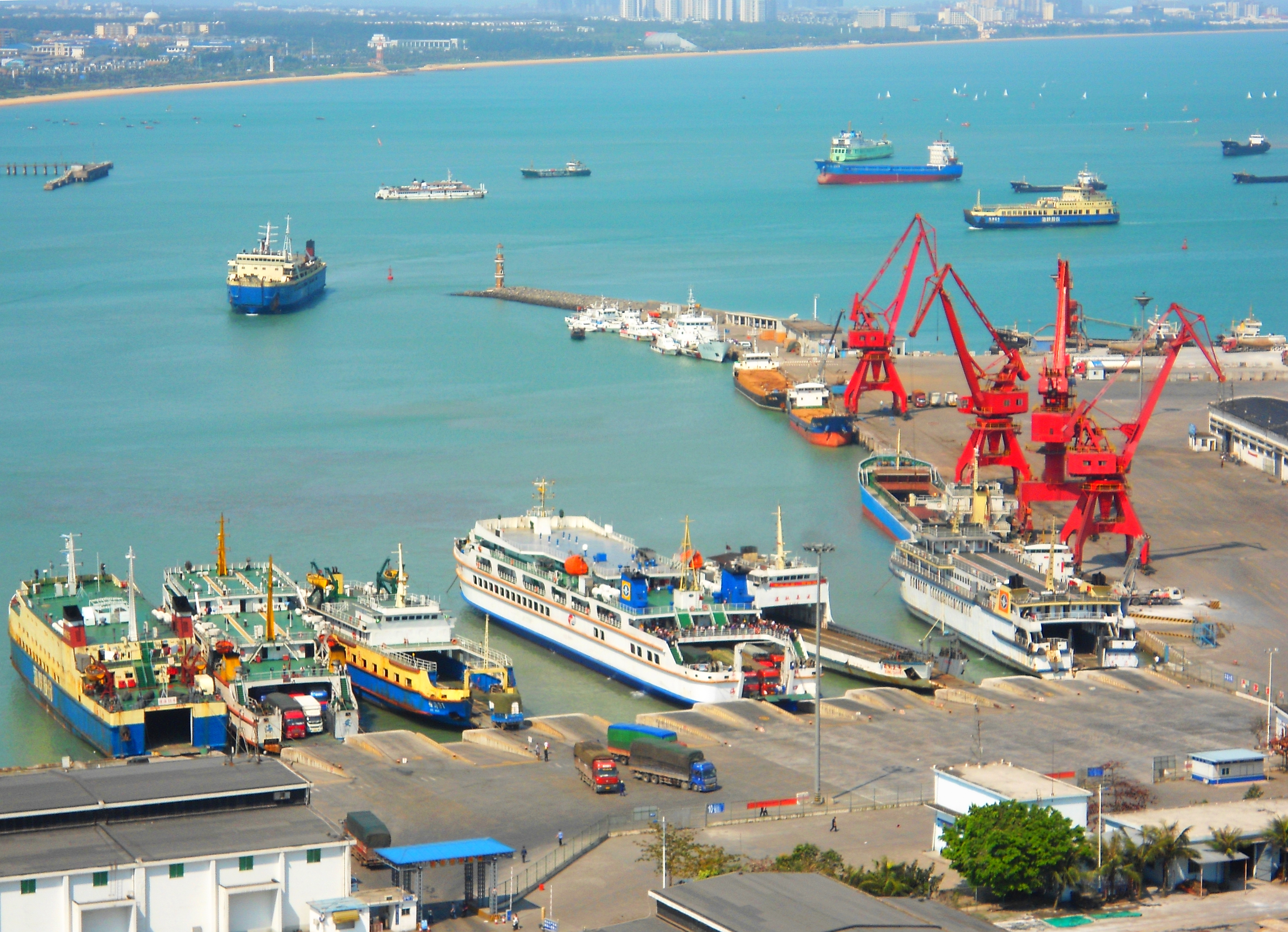

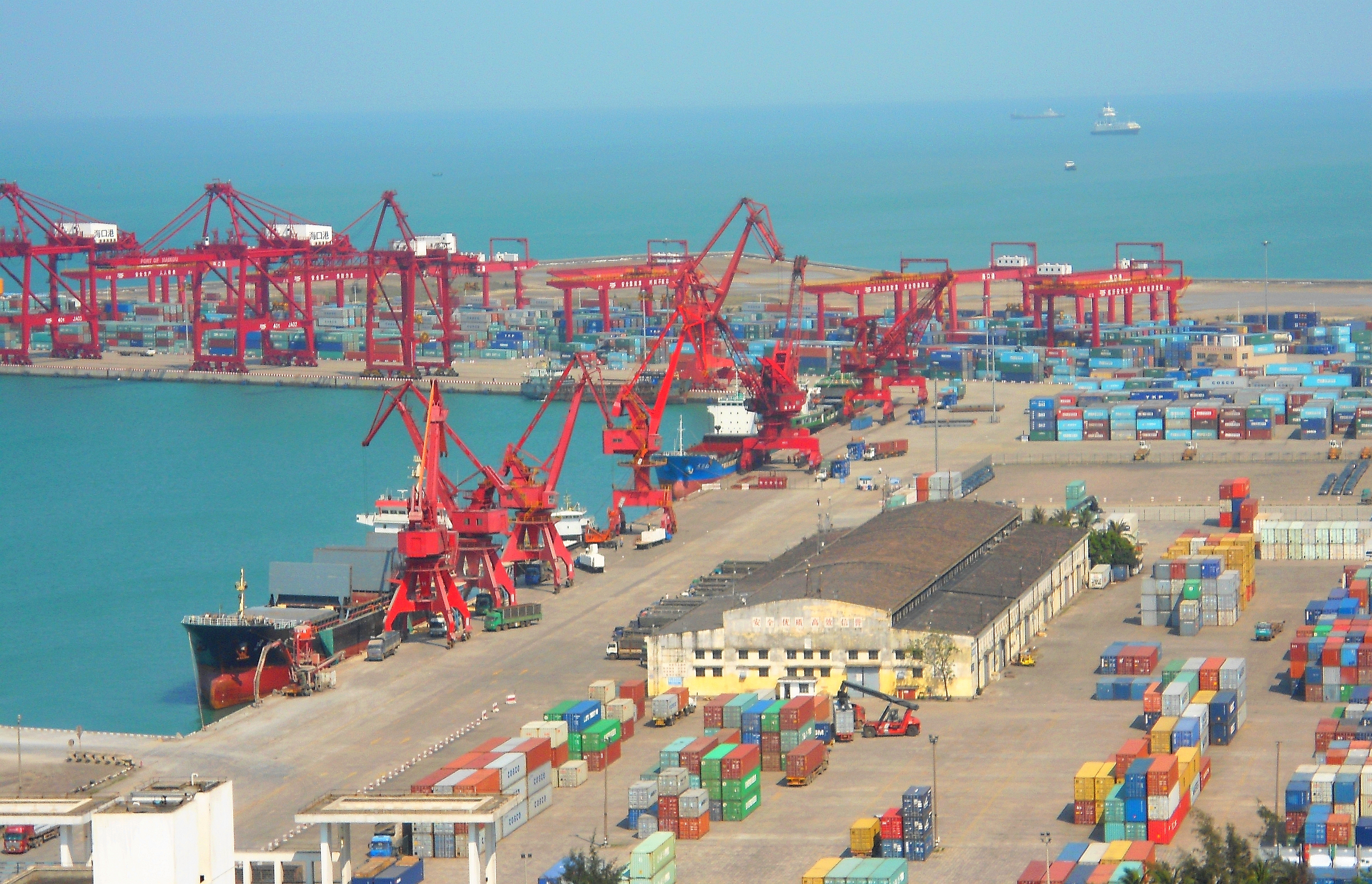

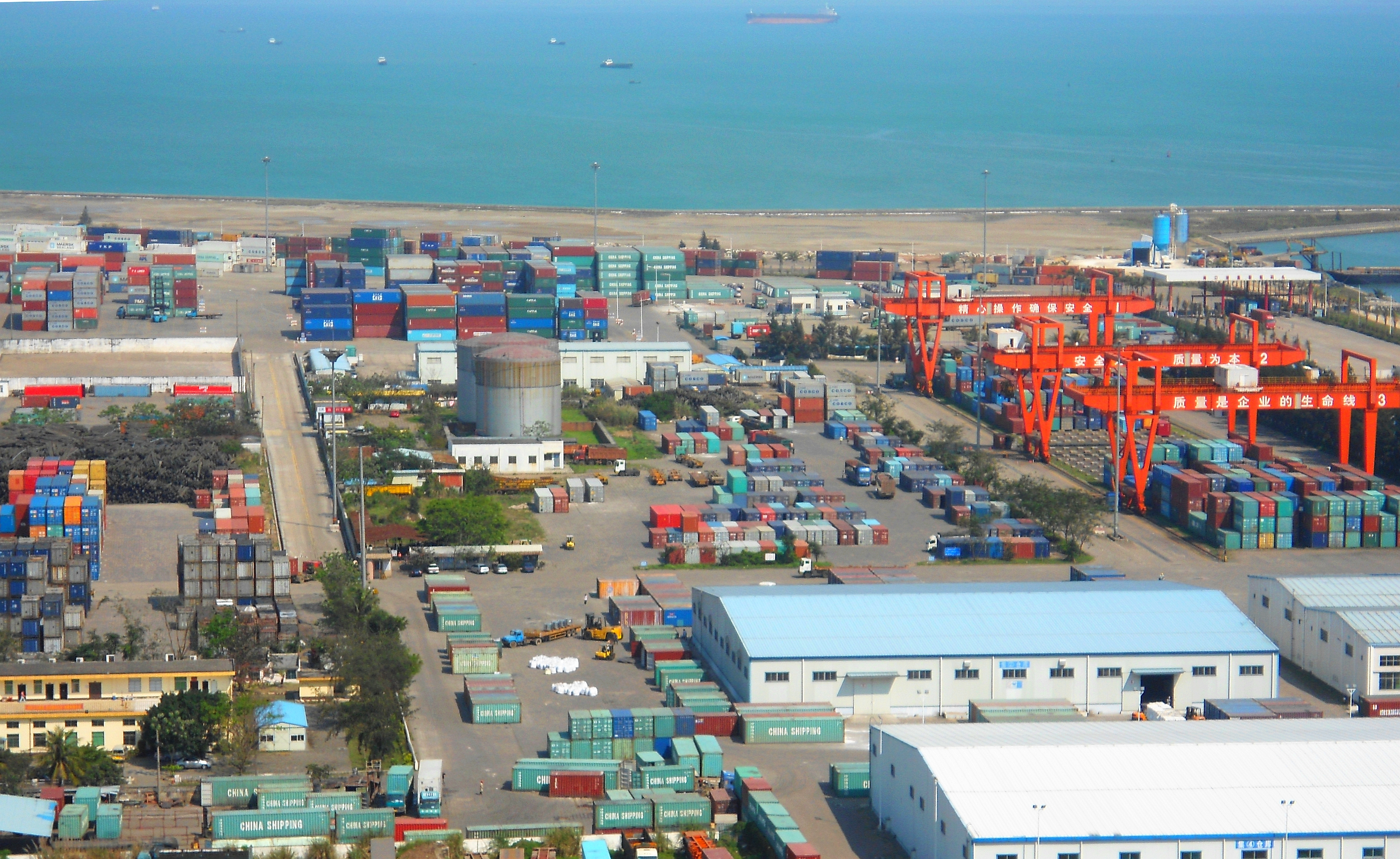

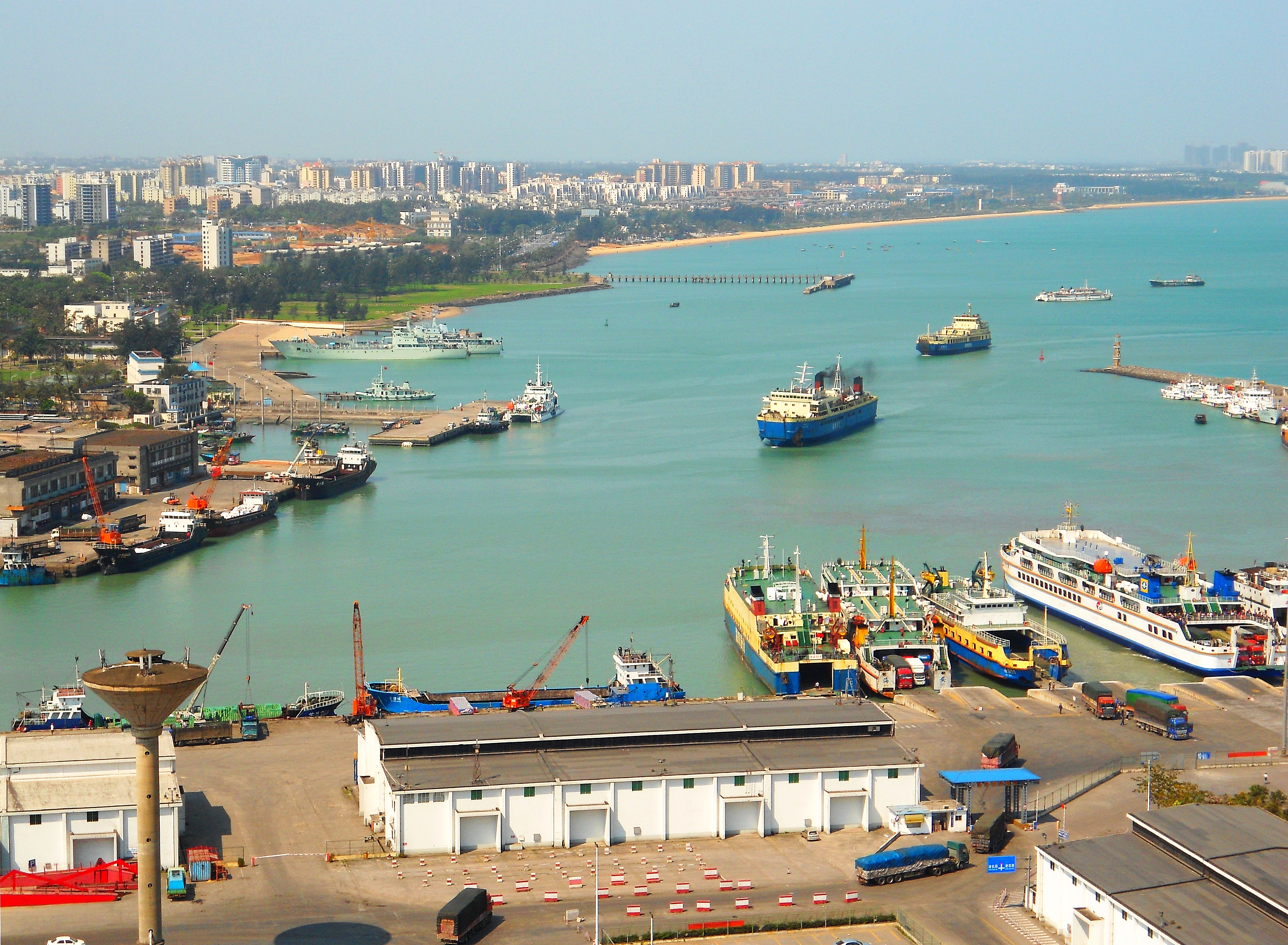
