= Haikou New Port =

Coordinates: 20.049935°N 110.319144°E

Haikou New Port 海口新港
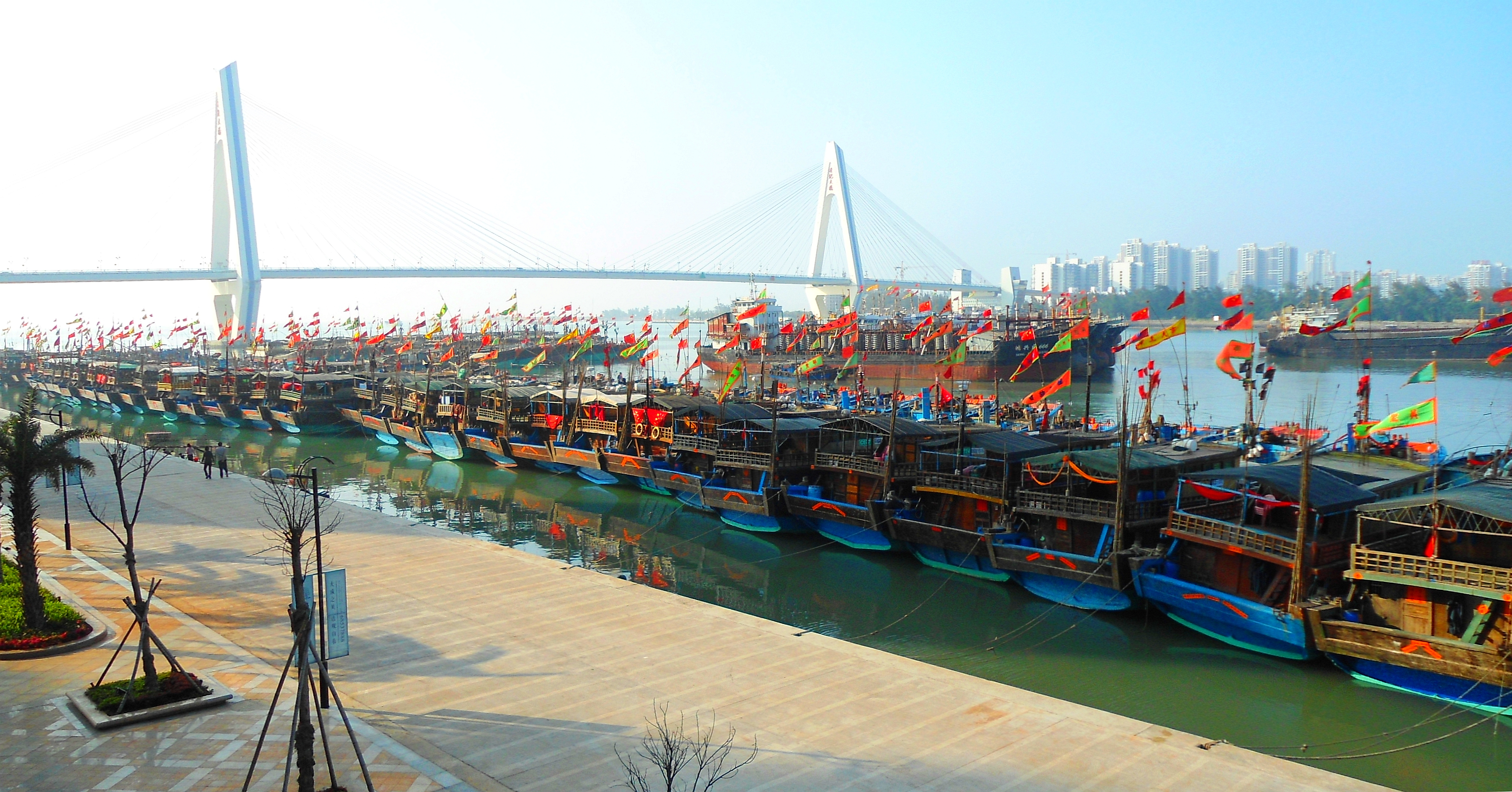
- Click on the map for a fullscreen view

Location
- Country: China
- Location: Xingang Road, Haikou

Details
- Owned by: Hainan Harbor & Shipping Holding Co., Ltd. (state-owned stock holding enterprise)

Haikou New Port (Chinese: 海口新港; pinyin: Hǎikǒu Xīn Gǎng) was a seaport in Hainan, China. The site was renovated in the 2010s and the port removed.

Formerly known as the Inner Harbour, this port was located on the southern side of the mouth of the Nandu River 7 km east of Haikou Xiuying Port. Before 2016, it was main distribution centre for cargo entering Hainan, including seafood, with a wholesale fish market located at the far eastern end. The wholesale fish market was now located in the middle of Xinbu Island. Haikou New Port was also a major port for immigration onto Hainan Island.

The site was first used as a seaport during the Song dynasty. In 1953, the port was structurally improved with the addition of cement foundations. In 1973, the Guangdong provincial government invested nearly 200 million RMB for an expansion of the site. Improvements included increasing the depth of the water, which had been reduced due to silting. Storage facilities, a yard, and waiting room were also added, to increase the capacity of the port to 40 million tons annually.

== Fish market ==
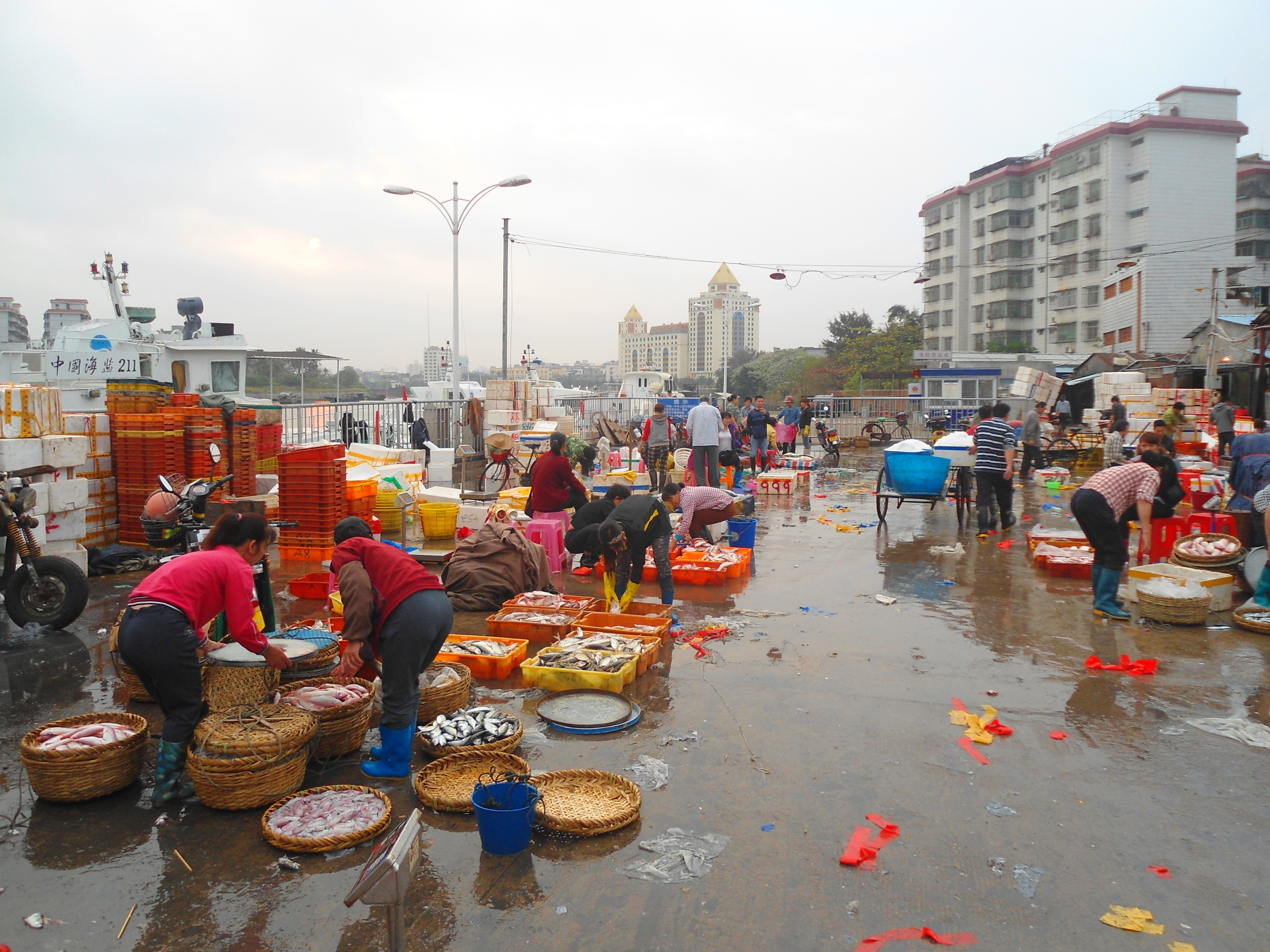
The former fish market at the eastern end provided seafood for markets and restaurants throughout the city

A fish market was located at the eastern end of the port. It provided seafood to markets and restaurants around the city. Large sea fish were sold, as well as squid, shellfish, and smaller fish. Adjacent buildings housed operations related to this market. They stored and processed fish, and produced ice blocks to be chipped and sold to the dealers.

The main fish market for Haikou is now located in the middle of Xinbu Island to the east.

See Media related to Wholesale fish market (Haikou New Port) at Wikimedia Commons.

== Routes ==
Routes include:

=== Passengers and goods ===
- Hai'an
- Beihai
- Zhanjiang
- Shenzhen
- Guangzhou

=== Domestic container routes ===
- Guangzhou
- Beihai
- Zhanjiang
- Quanzhou
- Tianjin
- Dalian
- Qinhuangdao

=== International container routes ===
- Hong Kong
- Kaohsiung
- Shibushi
- Kokura
- Hiroshima

== Gallery ==
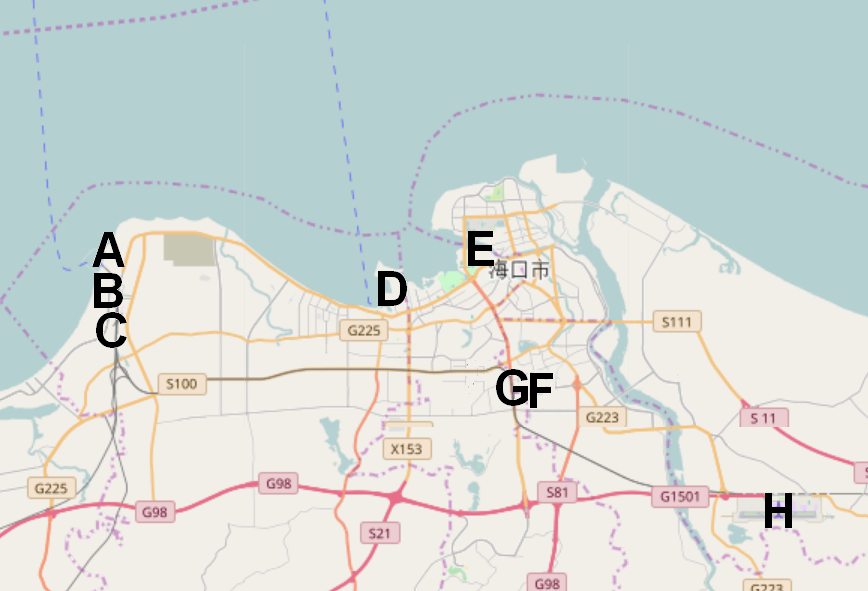
Main transportation hubs in Haikou: A: Haikou Port New Seaport; B: South Port; C: Haikou Railway Station; D: Haikou Xiuying Port; E: Haikou New Port; F: Haikou Transportation Center (main bus station); G: Haikou East Railway Station; H: Haikou Meilan International Airport

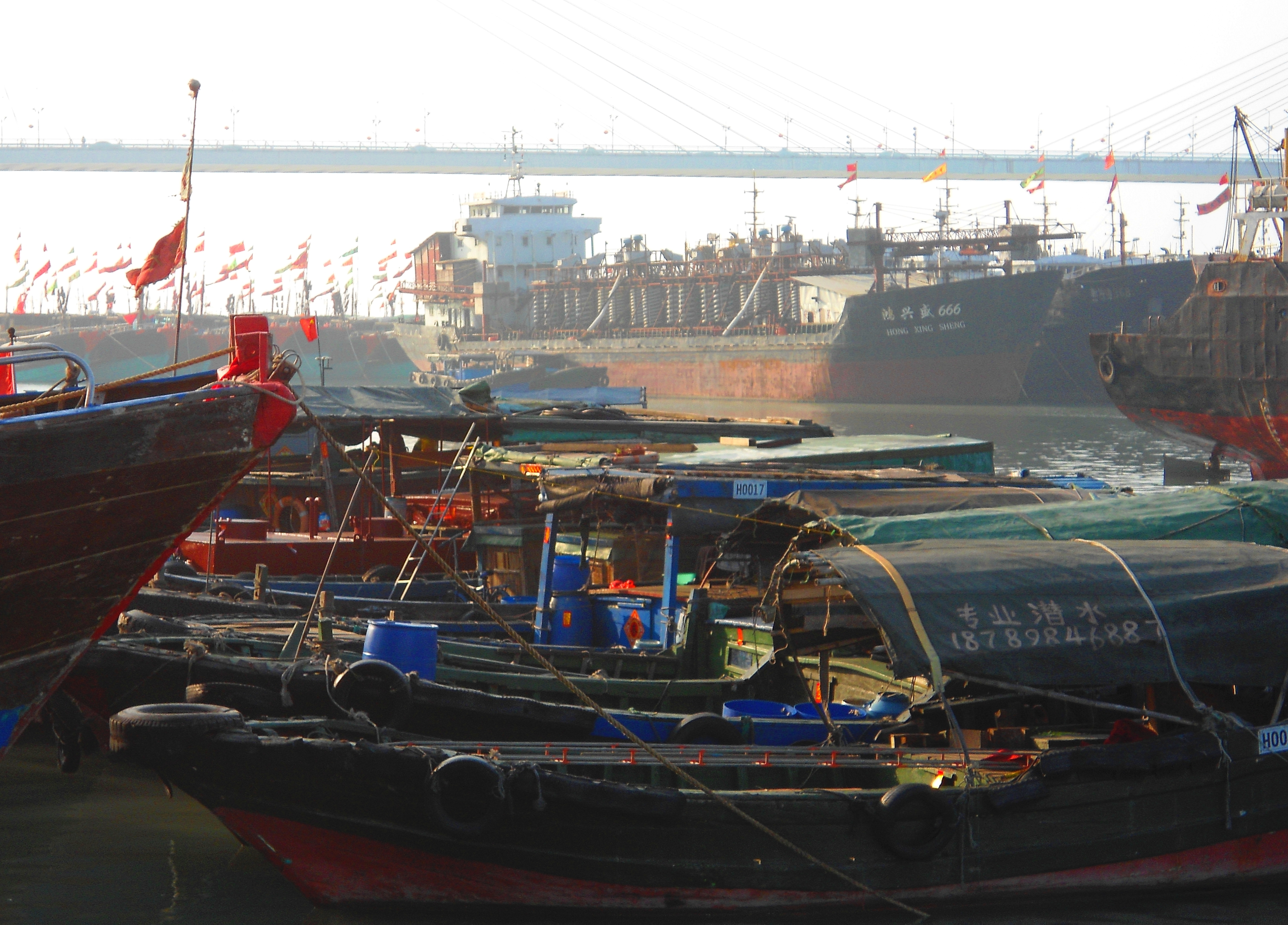

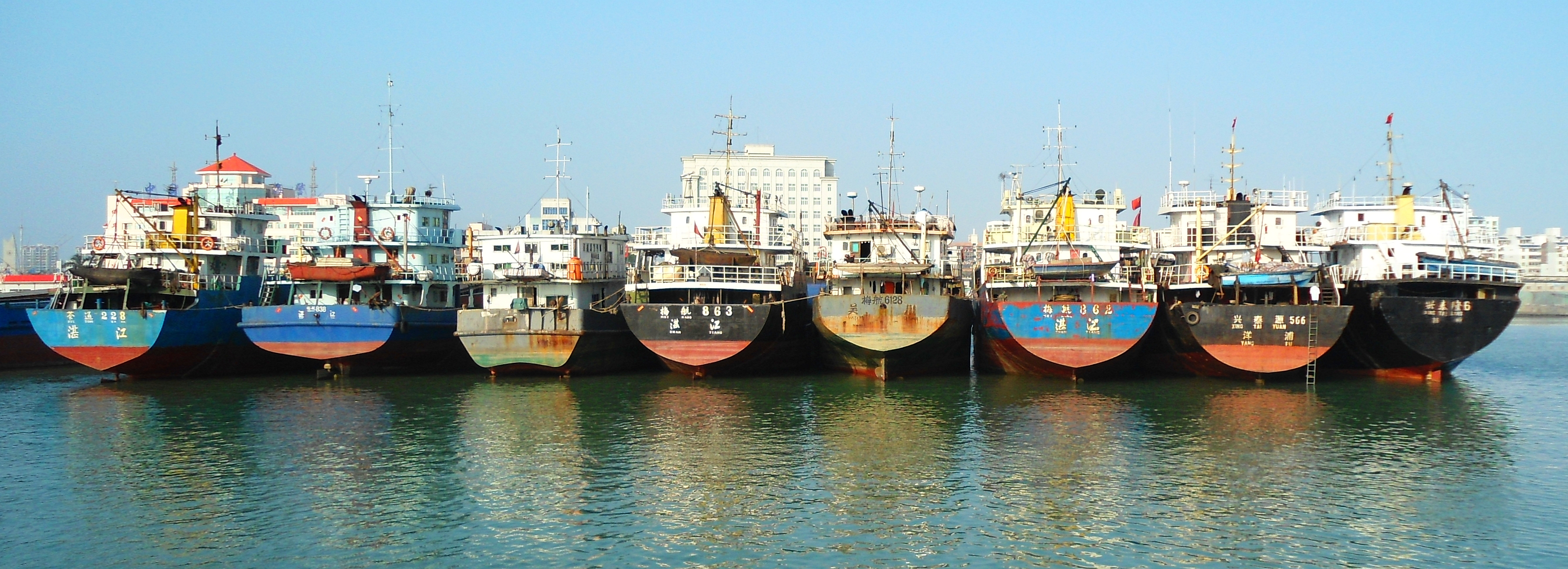

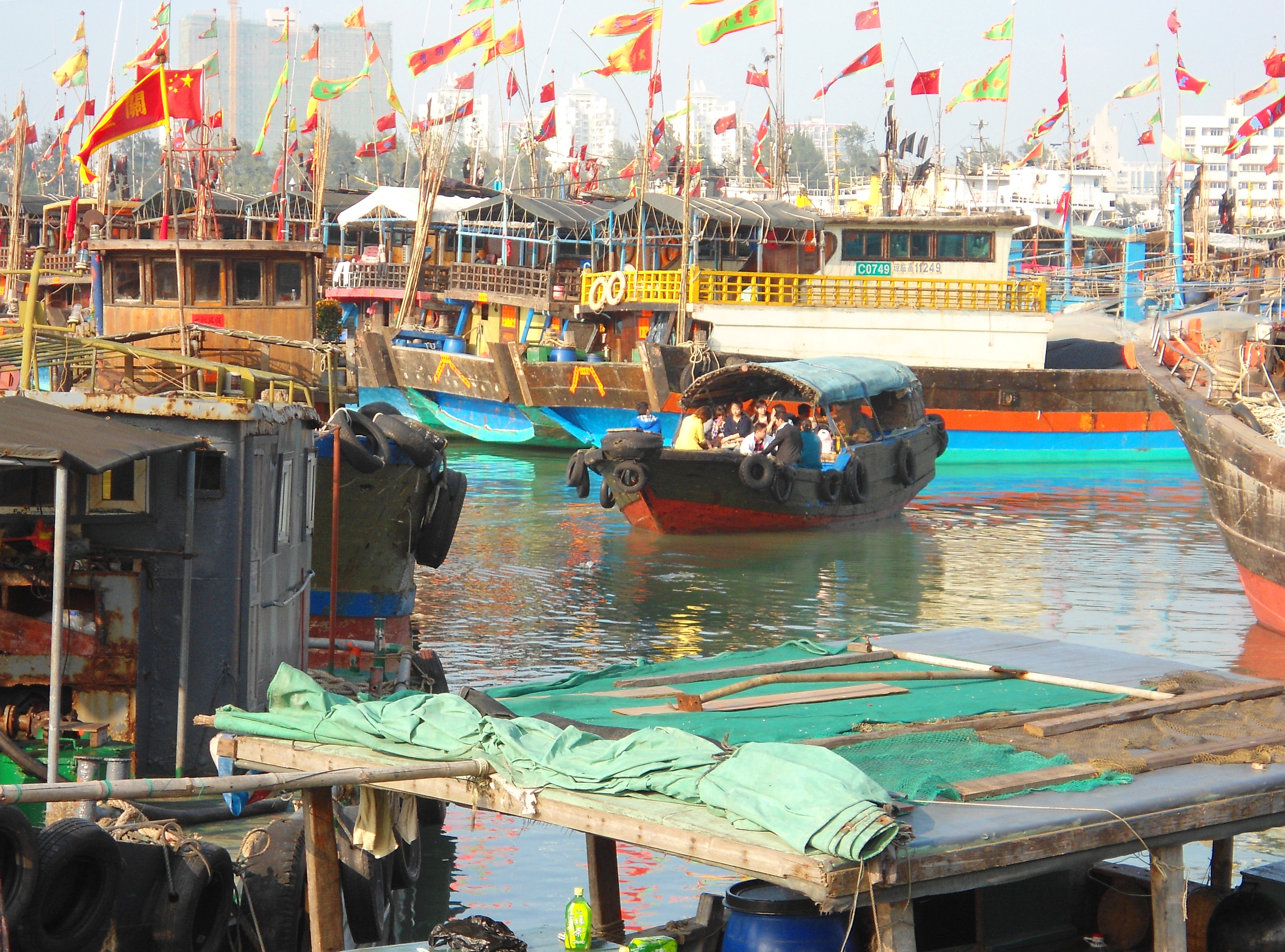

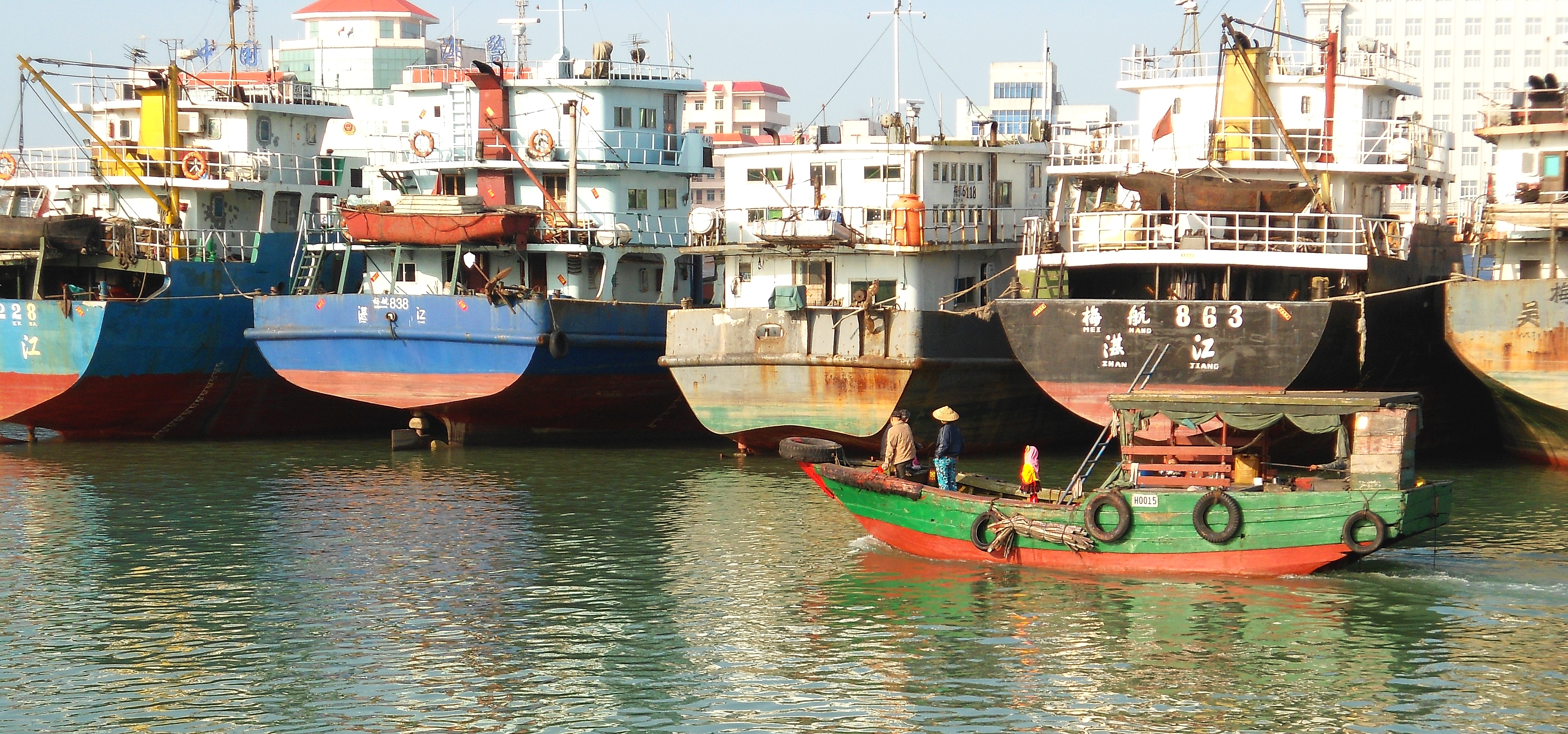
