= South Port =

Coordinates: 20.04047°N 110.15543°E

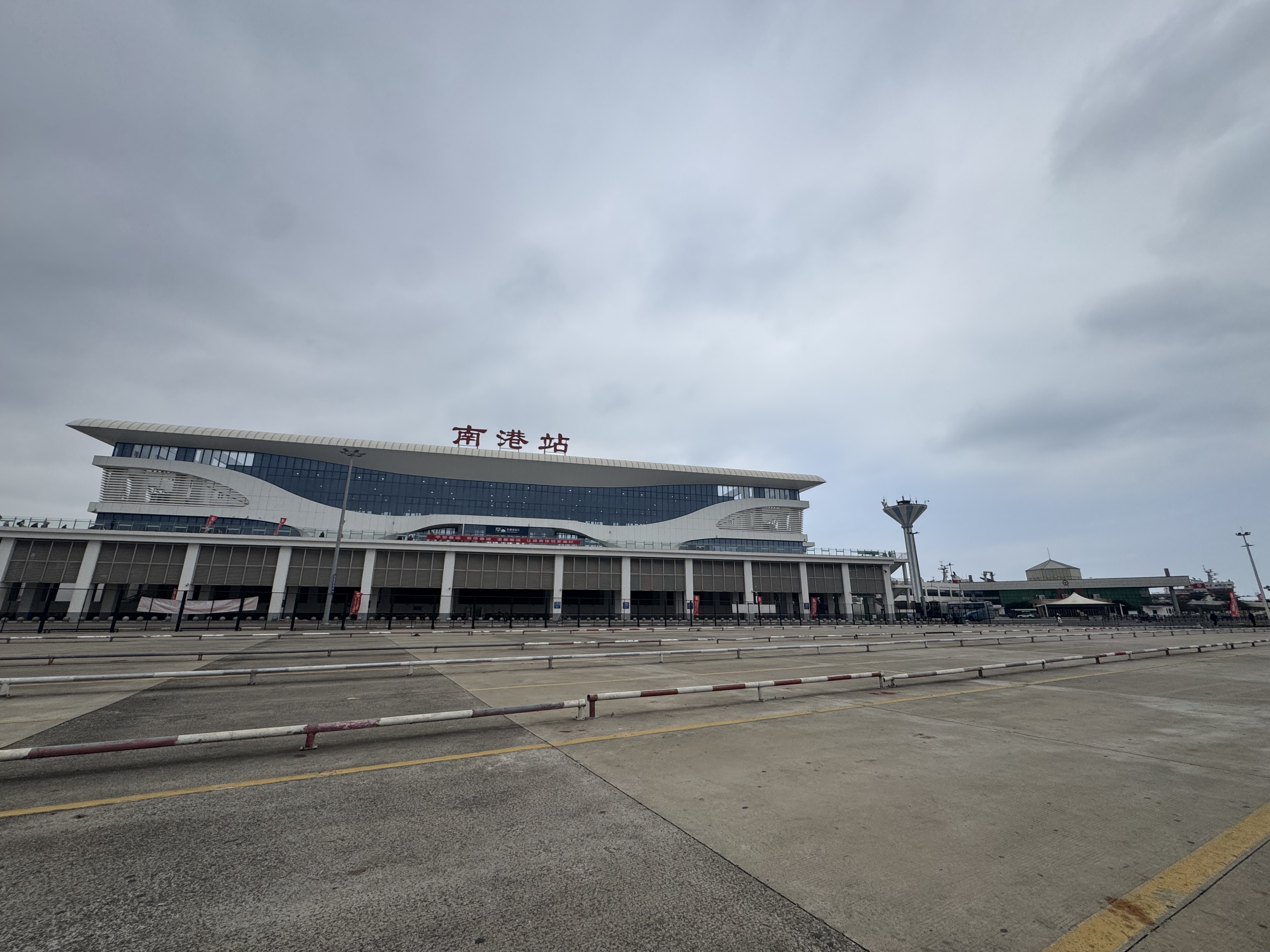
- Interactive map of South Port

Location
- Country: China
- Location: Xiuying District, Haikou, Hainan Province

South Port is a port located on the western coast of Xiuying District, Haikou, Hainan, China. It operates as the south terminal of the Yuehai Ferry service, part of the Guangdong–Hainan Railway. This ferry transports train cars across the Qiongzhou Strait between the Leizhou Peninsula at the southern tip of Guangdong on mainland China, and the northern coast of Hainan. Ferry boats arrive at South Port, unload the train cars onto tracks. The train cars then proceed a few hundred metres southeast to the Haikou Railway Station which is the last stop on the Guangdong–Hainan Railway.

== Destination ==
Destination	Terminal Name; English (Chinese)
Xuwen County, Zhanjiang	North Port (粤海铁路北港)

== Gallery ==
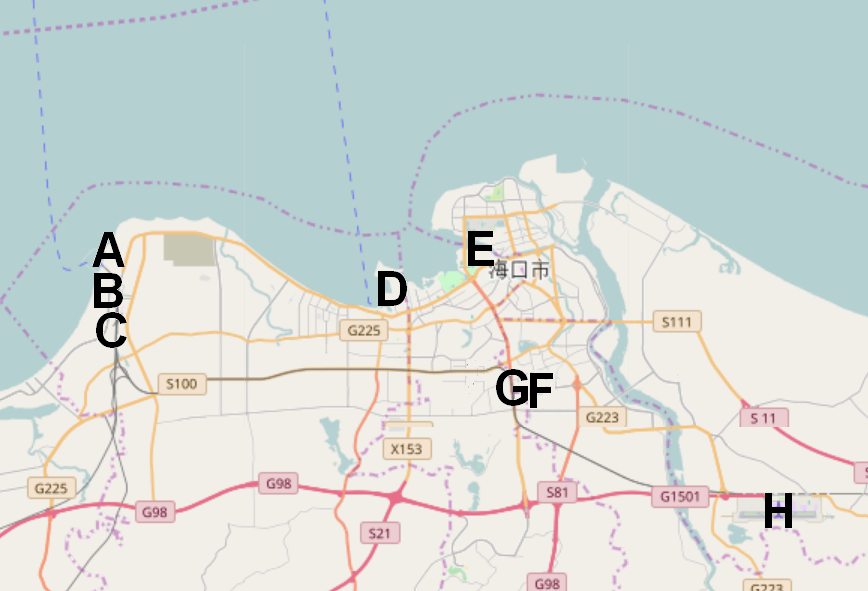
Main transportation hubs in Haikou: A: Haikou Port New Seaport; B: South Port; C: Haikou Railway Station; D: Haikou Xiuying Port; E: Haikou New Port; F: Haikou Transportation Center (main bus station); G: Haikou East Railway Station; H: Haikou Meilan International Airport

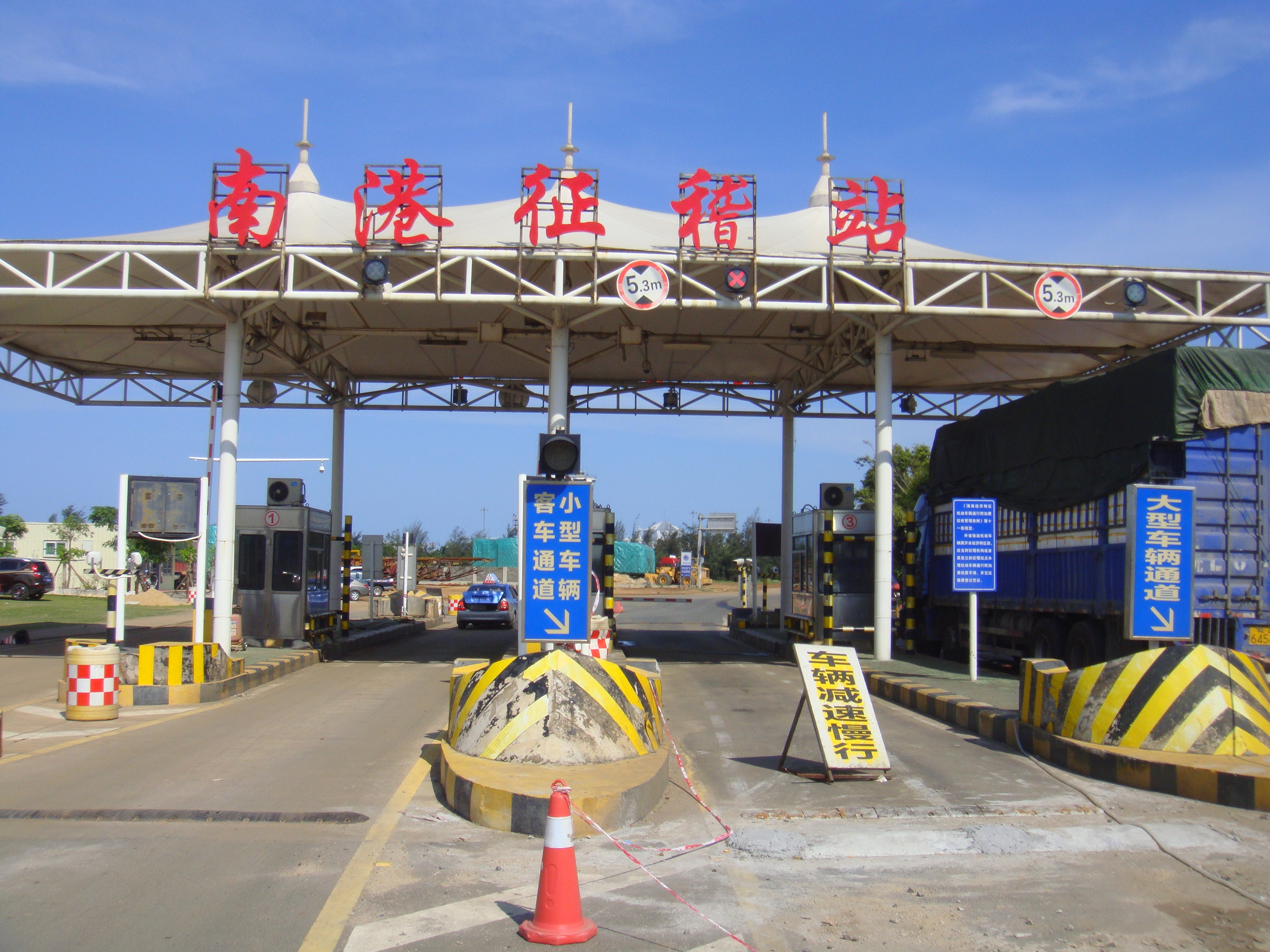
Main entrance road with toll booths

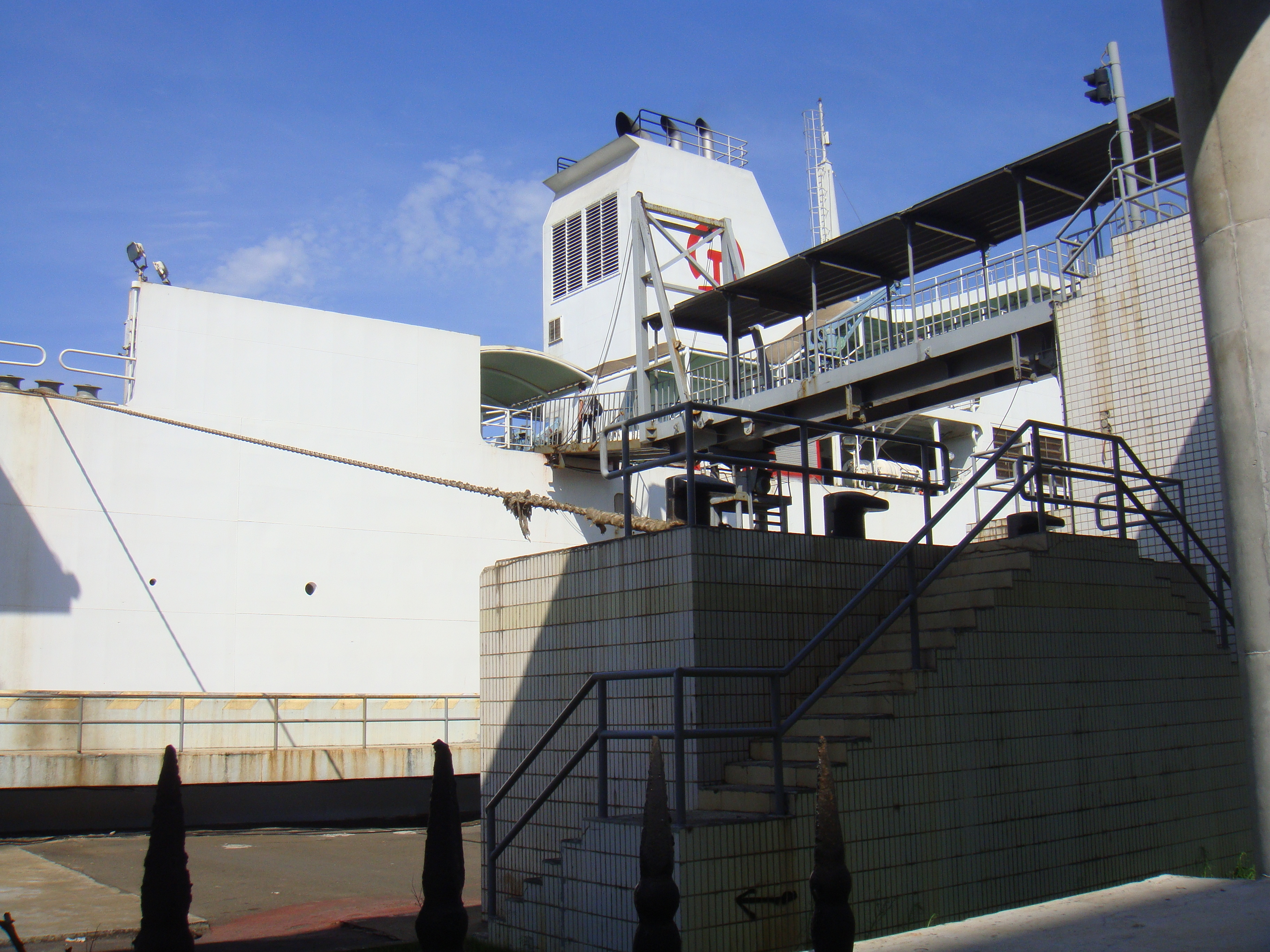
Walkway for pedestrian access to ferry

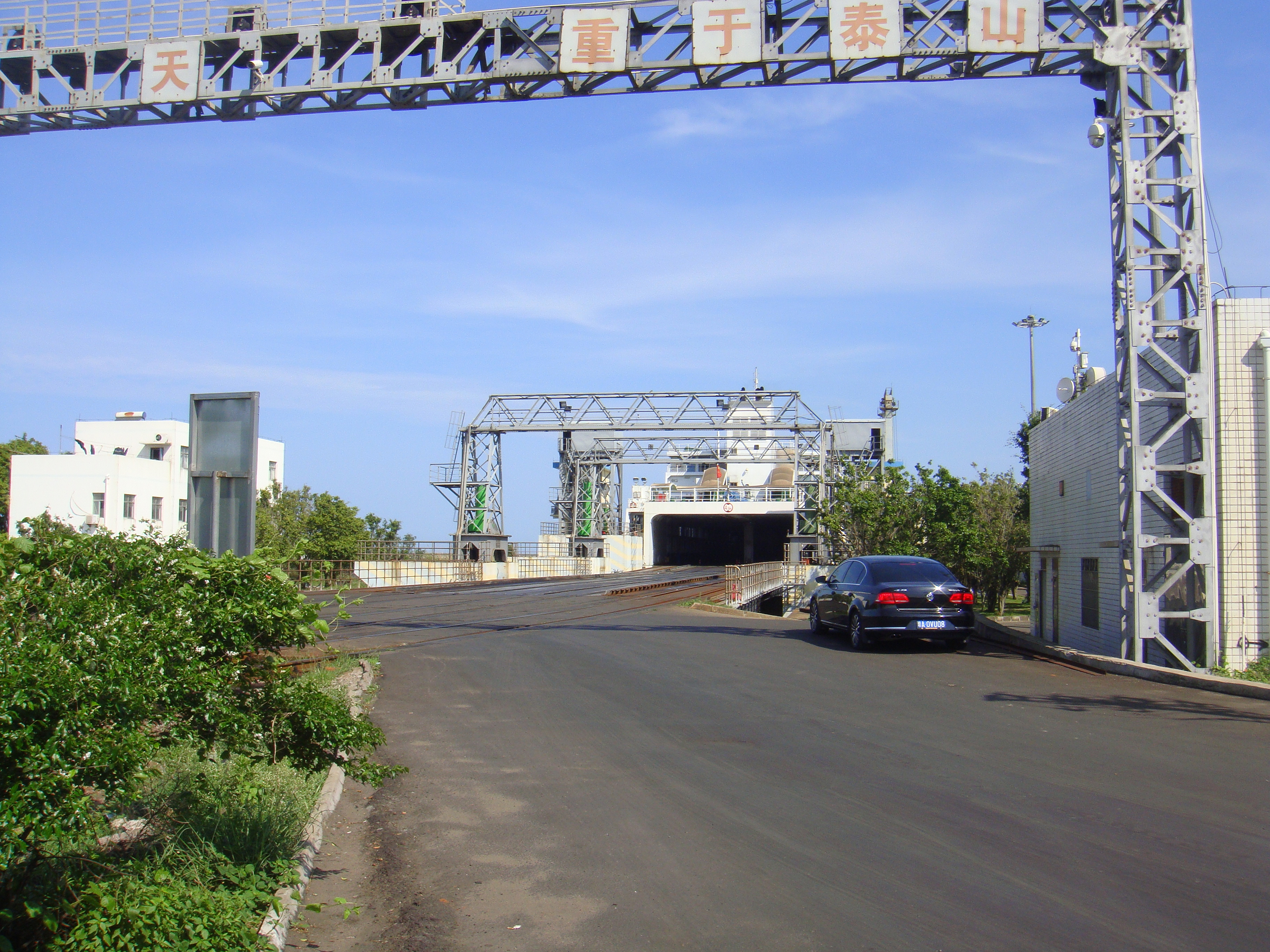
Ferry and rail line

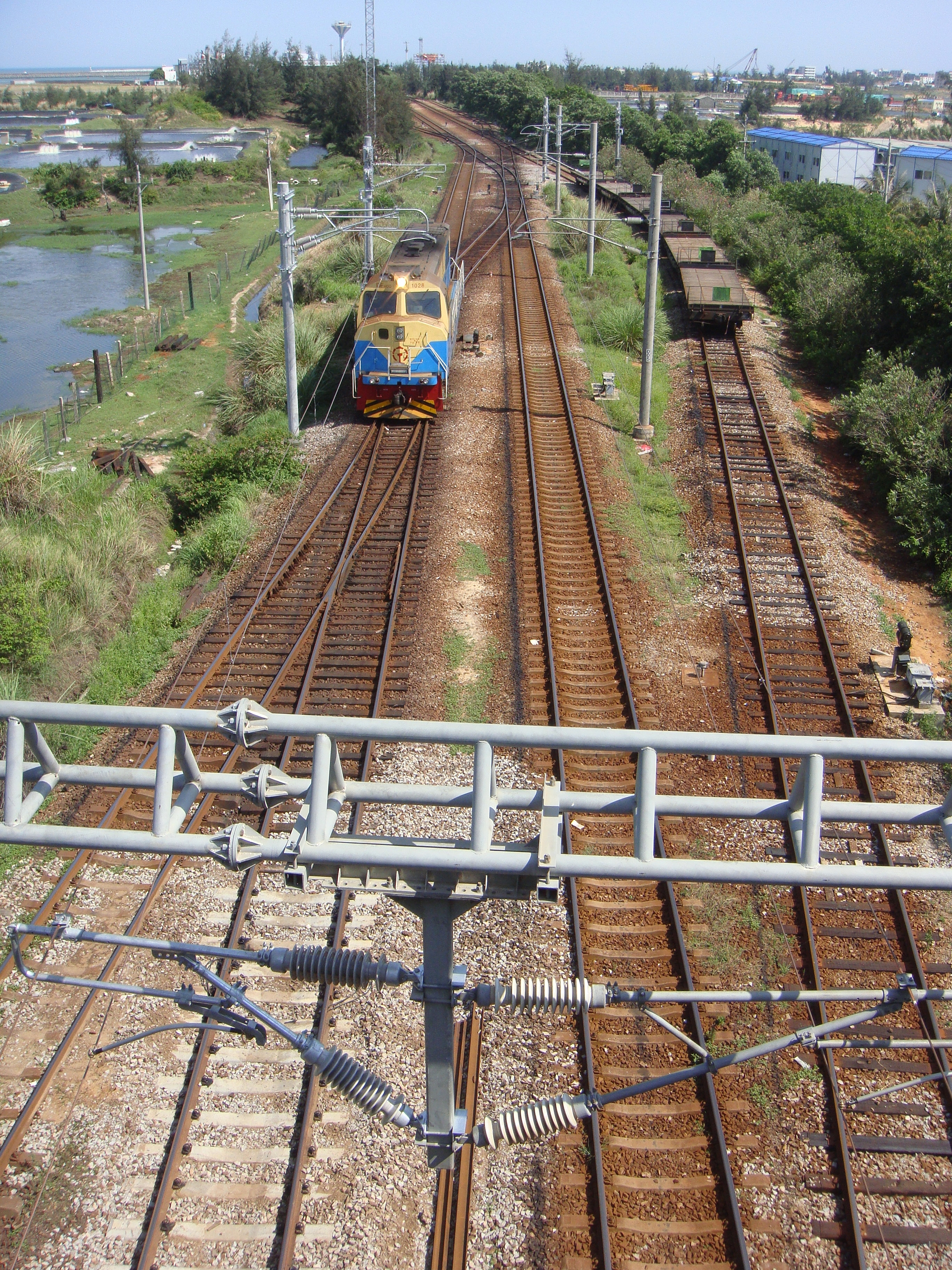
Rail line between South Port and Haikou Railway Station

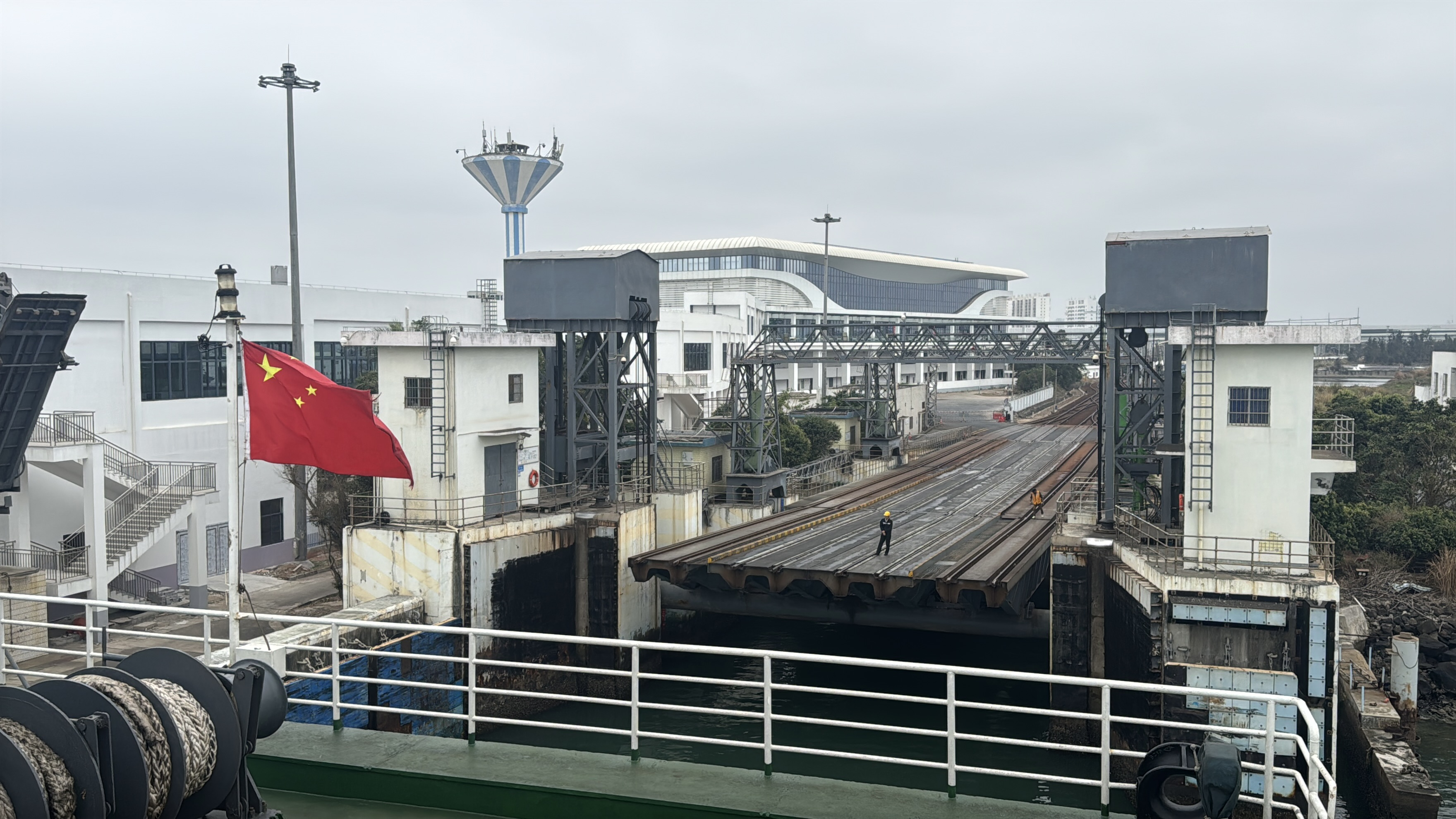
Ferry arriving

== See also ==
- Haikou Port New Seaport, a new seaport located around 1 km north of South Port, opened in 2017
