= China National Highway 207 =

Road in China

National Highway 207
- 207国道

Route information
- Length: 3,738 km (2,323 mi)

Major junctions
- From: Ulanhot, Inner Mongolia
- To: Hai'an, Guangdong

Location
- Country: China

Highway system
- National Trunk Highway System; Primary; Auxiliary
← G206	→ G208

China National Highway 207 (G207) runs from Ulanhot, Inner Mongolia to Hai'an, Guangdong. It is 3,738 km (2,323 mi) in length and runs south from Xilinhot through Inner Mongolia, Hebei, Shanxi, Henan, Hubei, Guangxi, and ends in Guangdong.

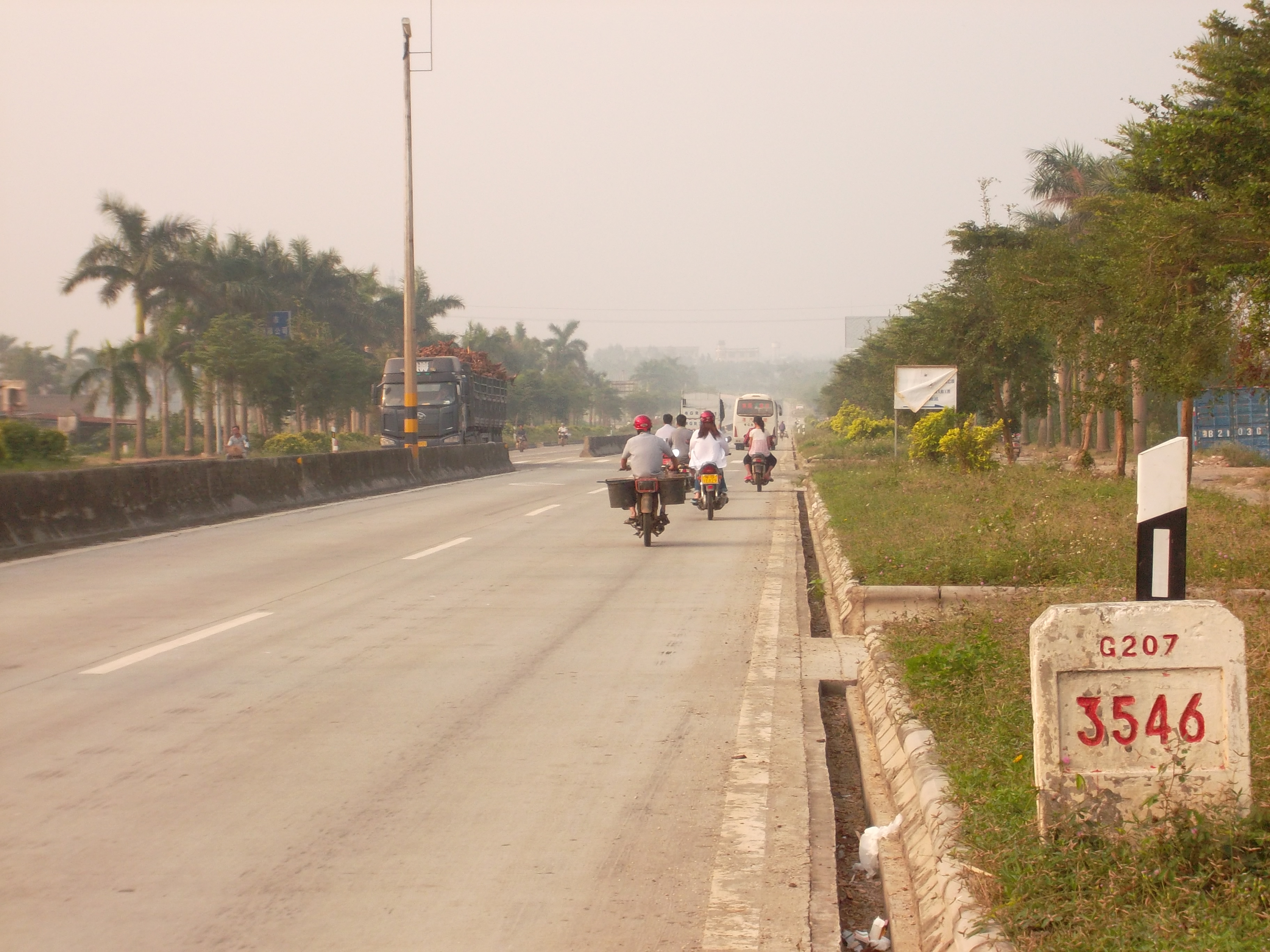
G207 in Guangdong Province

== Route and distance ==
Route and distance

City	Distance (km)
Ulanhot, Inner Mongolia	0
Huitenghe, Inner Mongolia	76
Wuritu, Inner Mongolia	83
Xulun Hoh Banner, Inner Mongolia	178
Taibus Banner, Inner Mongolia	286
Zhangbei, Hebei	382
Zhangjiakou, Hebei	429
Xuanhua, Hebei	464
Laiyuan, Hebei	665
Fuping, Hebei	769
Yangquan, Shanxi	977
Pingding, Shanxi	987
Xiyang, Shanxi	1012
Heshun, Shanxi	1062
Zuoquan, Shanxi	1101
Licheng, Shanxi	1187
Lucheng, Shanxi	1218
Changzhi, Shanxi	1235
Gaoping, Shanxi	1291
Jincheng, Shanxi	1337
Zezhou, Shanxi	1344
Dengfeng, Henan	1508
Ruzhou, Henan	1558
Nanzhao, Henan	1699
Zhenping, Henan	1765
Dengzhou, Henan	1826
Xiangfan, Hubei	1912
Yicheng, Hubei	1954
Jingmen, Hubei	2033
Wulipu, Hubei	
Jingzhou, Hubei	2112
Gong'an, Hubei	2148
Lixian, Hunan	2233
Linli, Hunan	2263
Changde, Hunan	2314
Anhua, Hunan	2450
Lianyuan, Hunan	2538
Xinshao, Hunan	2601
Shaoyang City, Hunan	2613
Shaoyang County, Hunan	2651
Dong'an County, Hunan	2742
Yongzhou, Hunan	2796
Shuangpai, Hunan	2828
Daoxian, Hunan	2894
Jianghua, Hunan	2935
Hezhou, Guangxi	3038
Wuzhou, Guangxi	3208
Cangwu, Guangxi	3224
Cenxi, Guangxi	3295
Xinyi, Guangdong	3396
Gaozhou, Guangdong	3456
Huazhou, Guangdong	3499
Suixi, Guangdong	3556
Leizhou, Guangdong	3625
Xuwen, Guangdong	3728
Hai'an, Guangdong	3738

== In popular culture ==
- In a YouTube series titled "Tip2Tip", Ludwig Ahgren and Michael Reeves made a wrong exit on the G207, entering Huaqiao village (Chinese: 花桥村; pinyin: Huāqiáo Cūn) in Shaoyang, Hunan and mistook a funeral as an eatery, which garnered attention among internet users in China.

== See also ==
- China National Highways
