= Hai'an railway station =

Railway station in Hai'an, Nantong, Jiangsu

Hai'an 海安
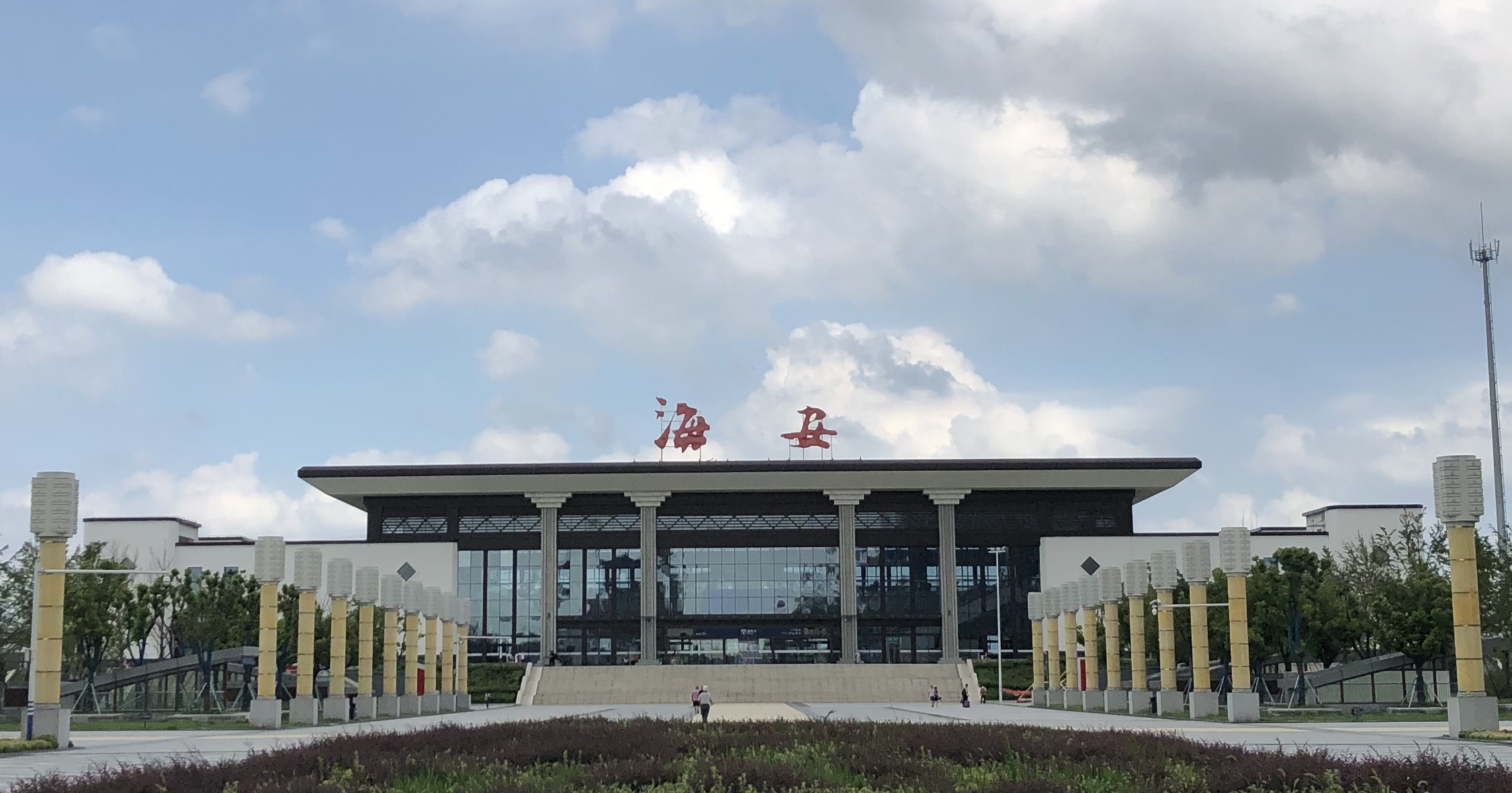

General information
- Location: Hai'an, Nantong, Jiangsu; China
- Coordinates: 32°32′58″N 120°29′57″E
- Line(s): Xinyi–Changxing railway; Nanjing–Qidong railway; Hai'an–Yangkou Port railway; Yancheng–Nantong high-speed railway

History
- Opened: 2004

Hai'an railway station (Chinese: 海安站; pinyin: Hǎi'ān zhàn) is a railway station in Hai'an, Nantong, Jiangsu, China.

== History ==
Construction on the station began in 1998. It was sited at the intersection point between the Xinyi–Changxing railway and the Nanjing–Qidong railway. It opened in 2004. On 8 February 2015, a new station building was opened.

== Station name ==
On 20 August 2018, the name of the station was changed from Hai'an County (Chinese: 海安县) to Hai'an. This followed the former Hai'an railway station in Xuwen County, Guangdong Province changing its name to Hai'an South.

Preceding station	China Railway	Following station
Dongtai towards Xinyi	Xinyi–Changxing railway	Terminus
Jiangyang towards Nanjing	Nanjing–Qidong railway	Rugao towards Nantong
Terminus	Hai'an–Rudong railway	Bencha towards Rudong
Preceding station	China Railway High-speed	Following station
Dongtai towards Yancheng	Yancheng–Nantong high-speed railway	Rugao South towards Nantong or Nantong West
