= Haikou East railway station =

Railway station in Haikou, China

Haikou East 海口东
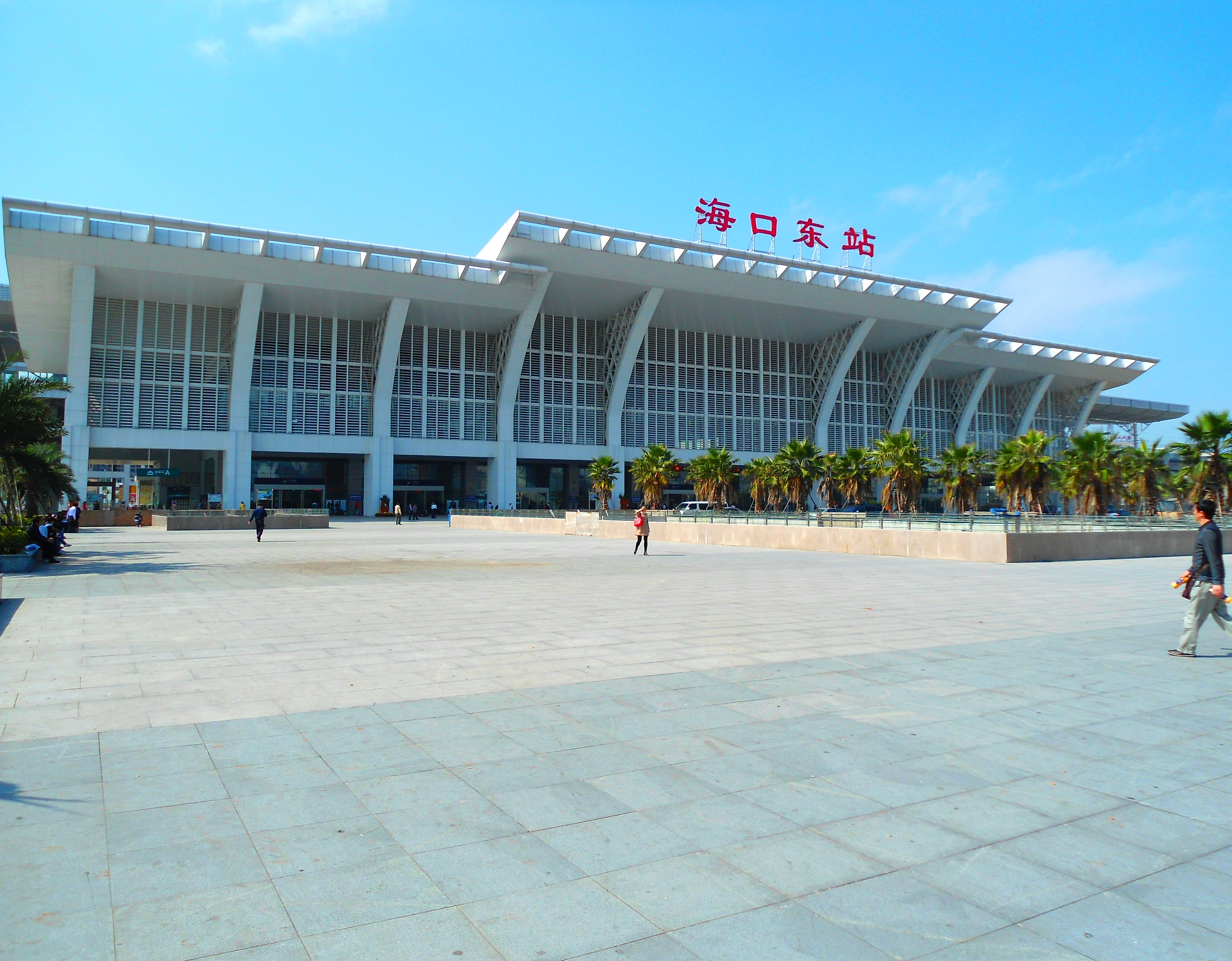
- Front of station

General information
- Coordinates: 19.9857°N 110.3432°E
- Line: Hainan eastern ring high-speed railway
Location

Haikou East railway station is a railway station on the Hainan eastern ring high-speed railway located at the south end of Longqun Road in Haikou, Hainan, China.

In 2018, the Haikou Transportation Center, the main bus station, relocated and is now directly to the south east of Haikou East Railway Station.

== Gallery ==
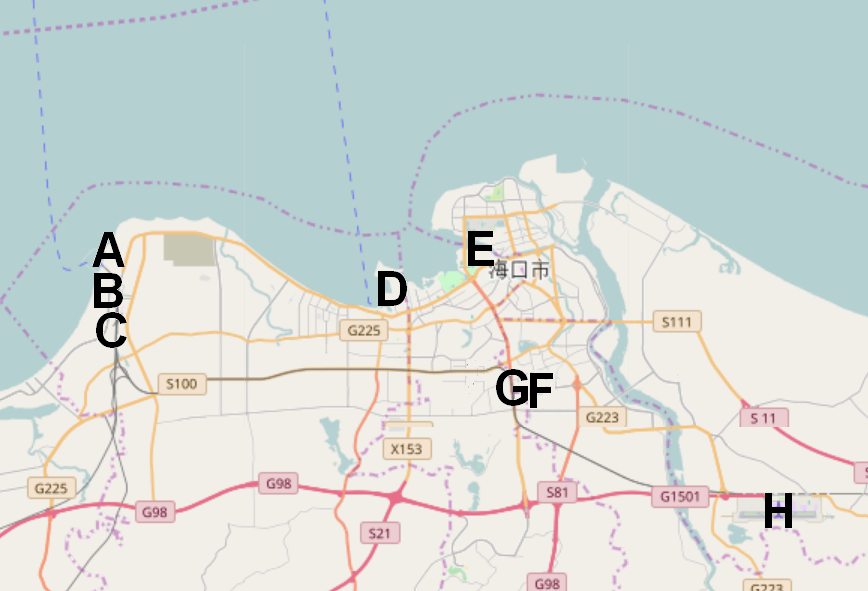
Main transportation hubs in Haikou: A: Haikou Port New Seaport; B: South Port; C: Haikou railway station; D: Haikou Xiuying Port; E: Haikou New Port; F: Haikou Transportation Center (main bus station); G: Haikou East railway station; H: Haikou Meilan International Airport

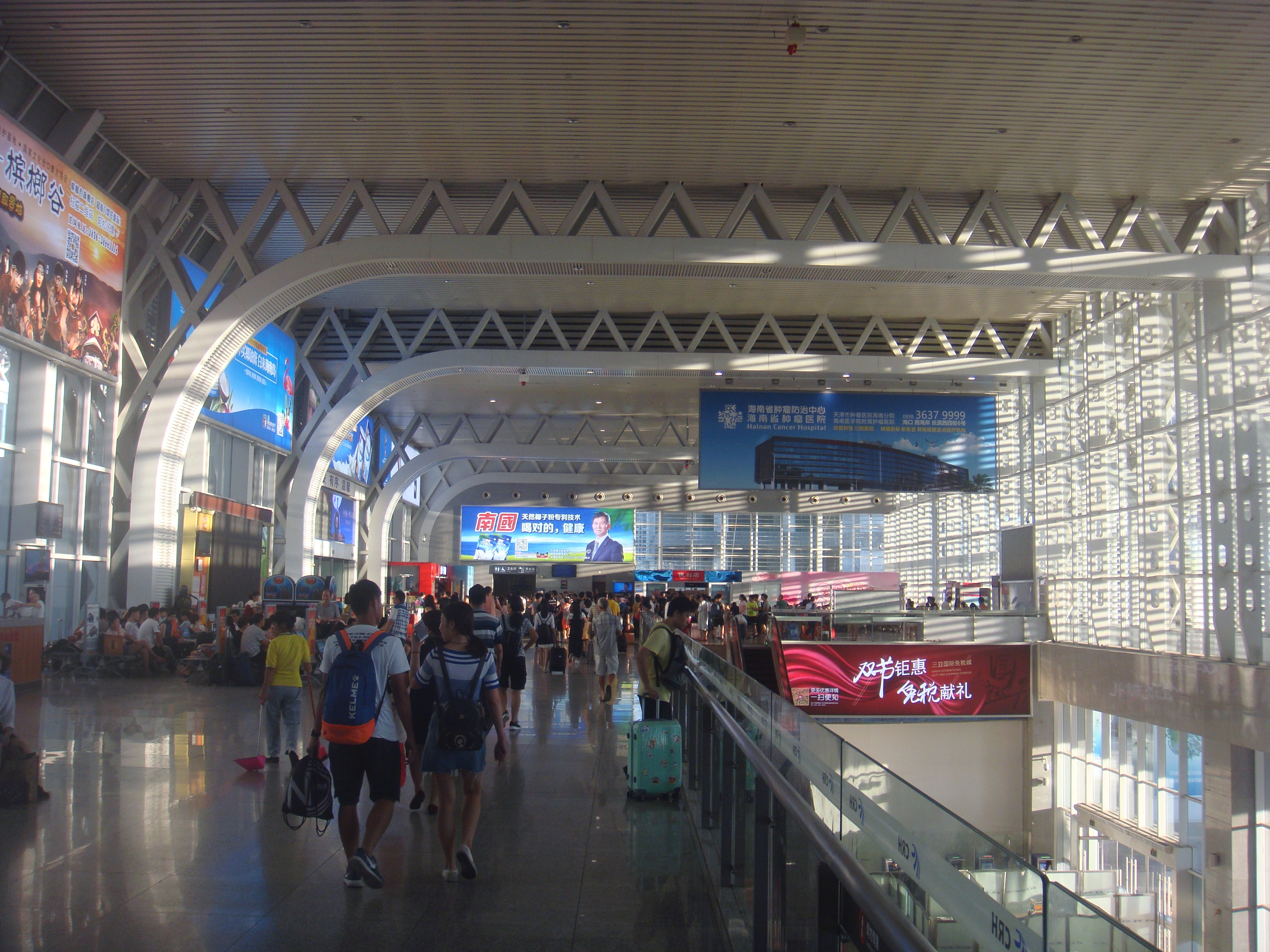
Main hall

Preceding station	China Railway High-speed	Following station
Chengxi towards Haikou	Hainan eastern ring high-speed railway	Meilan towards Sanya
