= Rudong County =

Rudong 如东县 Jutung
- County
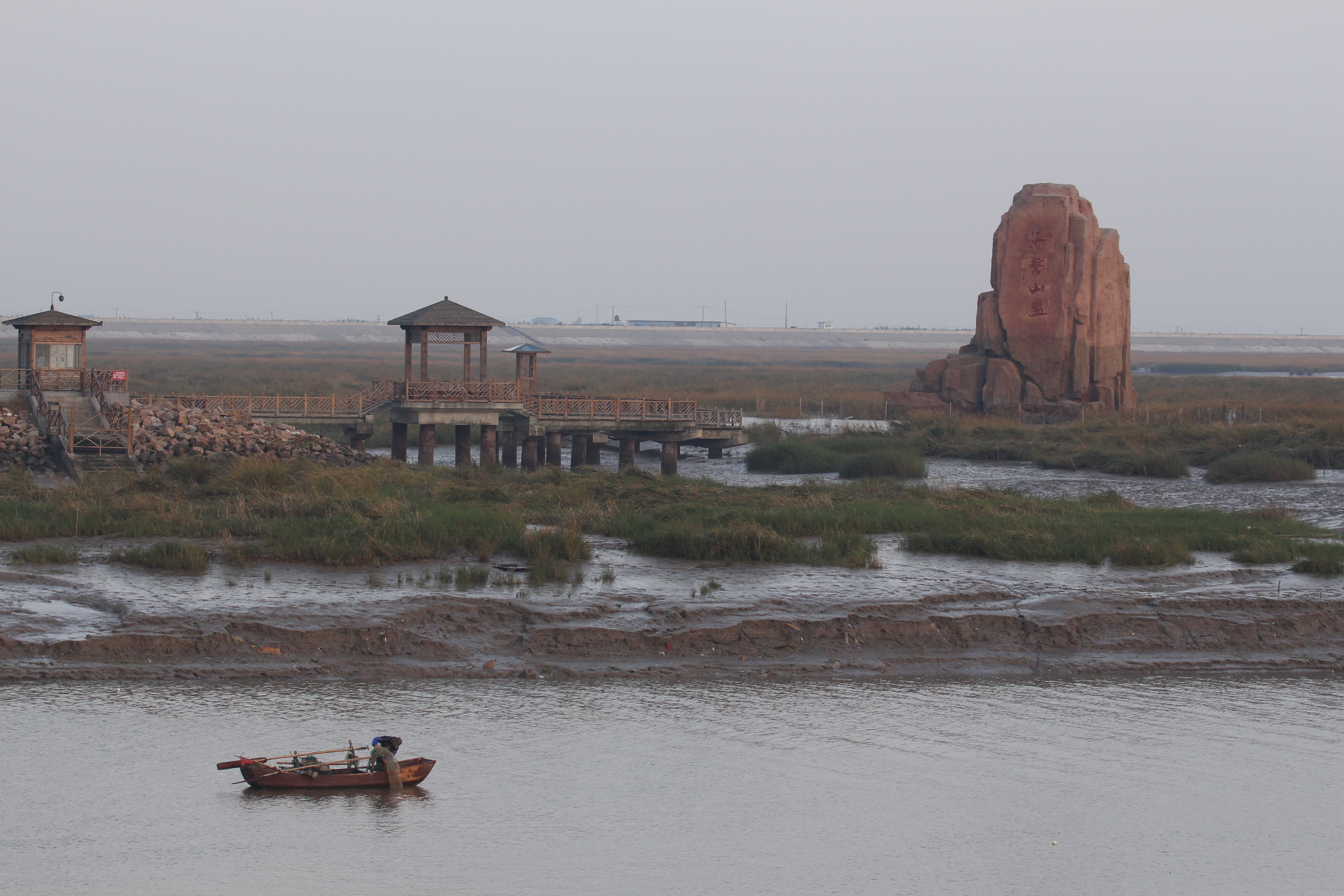

- Location in Jiangsu
- Coordinates: 32°24′25″N 121°04′30″E
- Country: People's Republic of China
- Province: Jiangsu
- Prefecture-level city: Nantong

Area
  - Total: 1,972 km^{2} (761 sq mi)

Population (2020)
  - Total: 880,006
  - Density: 446.3/km^{2} (1,156/sq mi)
- Time zone: UTC+8 (China Standard)
- Postal Code: 226400

Rudong County (simplified Chinese: 如东县; traditional Chinese: 如東縣; pinyin: Rúdōng Xiàn) is under the administration of Nantong, Jiangsu province, China, and lies on the Yellow Sea coast. It administers 14 towns and five districts. The 14 towns are Juegang, Matang, Fengli, Caobu, Chahe, Shuangdian, Xindian, Hekou, Yuanzhuang, Changsha, Ju, Yangkou, Bencha and Dayu. The county seat is Juegang.

== Administrative divisions ==
At present, Rudong County has 14 towns.

14 towns

- Bingcha (栟茶镇)
- Caobu (曹埠镇)
- Chahe (岔河镇)
- Changsha (长沙镇)
- Dayu (大豫镇)
- Fengli (丰利镇)
- Hekou (河口镇)
- Ju (苴镇)
- Juegang (掘港镇)
- Matang (马塘镇)
- Shuangdian (双甸镇)
- Xindian (新店镇)
- Yangkou (洋口镇)
- Yuanzhuang (袁庄镇)

== Climate ==
Climate data for Rudong, elevation 6 m (20 ft), (1991–2020 normals, extremes 1959–present)
Month	Jan	Feb	Mar	Apr	May	Jun	Jul	Aug	Sep	Oct	Nov	Dec	Year
Record high °C (°F)	20.8 (69.4)	25.2 (77.4)	31.1 (88.0)	32.5 (90.5)	37.5 (99.5)	37.7 (99.9)	39.2 (102.6)	39.1 (102.4)	37.2 (99.0)	35.7 (96.3)	29.3 (84.7)	23.9 (75.0)	39.2 (102.6)
Mean daily maximum °C (°F)	7.2 (45.0)	9.1 (48.4)	13.5 (56.3)	19.5 (67.1)	24.7 (76.5)	27.5 (81.5)	31.5 (88.7)	31.1 (88.0)	27.2 (81.0)	22.4 (72.3)	16.6 (61.9)	10.0 (50.0)	20.0 (68.1)
Daily mean °C (°F)	3.3 (37.9)	5.0 (41.0)	9.0 (48.2)	14.5 (58.1)	19.9 (67.8)	23.6 (74.5)	27.8 (82.0)	27.5 (81.5)	23.5 (74.3)	18.2 (64.8)	12.3 (54.1)	5.8 (42.4)	15.9 (60.5)
Mean daily minimum °C (°F)	0.4 (32.7)	1.8 (35.2)	5.4 (41.7)	10.4 (50.7)	16.0 (60.8)	20.6 (69.1)	24.9 (76.8)	24.8 (76.6)	20.5 (68.9)	14.6 (58.3)	8.7 (47.7)	2.4 (36.3)	12.5 (54.6)
Record low °C (°F)	−10.6 (12.9)	−10.2 (13.6)	−4.8 (23.4)	−0.9 (30.4)	3.8 (38.8)	12.0 (53.6)	16.6 (61.9)	17.4 (63.3)	11.6 (52.9)	2.7 (36.9)	−5.0 (23.0)	−10.5 (13.1)	−10.6 (12.9)
Average precipitation mm (inches)	53.3 (2.10)	48.6 (1.91)	73.6 (2.90)	63.6 (2.50)	81.2 (3.20)	161.5 (6.36)	178.4 (7.02)	188.4 (7.42)	101.1 (3.98)	53.7 (2.11)	57.4 (2.26)	39.2 (1.54)	1,100 (43.3)
Average precipitation days (≥ 0.1 mm)	8.9	9.2	10.2	10.0	10.6	11.9	12.5	12.2	9.6	7.3	8.2	7.6	118.2
Average snowy days	2.9	2.6	0.6	0	0	0	0	0	0	0	0.1	1.0	7.2
Average relative humidity (%)	76	76	75	74	75	81	82	83	80	76	76	74	77
Mean monthly sunshine hours	118.6	125.8	153.7	178.8	185.3	138.1	179.0	195.3	170.9	167.1	135.6	133.2	1,881.4
Percentage possible sunshine	37	40	41	46	43	32	41	48	47	48	43	43	42
Source: China Meteorological Administration all-time extreme temperature

== Etymology ==
The county took its name because it is located to the east of Rugao County and was once part of it. The ancient name of it was Fuhaizhou, which meant a small sand island in the ocean.

== Demographics and languages ==
The county has many extraneous people from the south of the Yangtse River (Changjiang River), so there are two main dialects: Rudonghua which is a branch of Jianghuai Mandarin and Shadihua (Wu: Sodiwo [so di ɯo]), which is a branch of the Wu language.

The one-child policy was implemented in Rudong before other parts of China, and as of 2023 it is China's oldest county: almost 39% of the population is aged 60 or older, compared to 18.7% nationwide.

== Economy ==
Rudong is located on the bank of the Yellow Sea. As a result, there is a sizable fishing industry and the county was named "the place of seafood in China" by the Chinese Cooking Association in 2007. Rudong also contains a harbor for commercial cargo. Yankou Harbor was launched in May 2011 and includes a facility for unloading liquified natural gas. In addition, there is a wind farm near Rudong's sea bank. The farm contained 217 turbines as of 2009, making it the largest in the country in its grade.

== Education ==
Jiangsu Rudong Senior High School was founded in 1938.

== Transportation ==
The Hai'an–Rudong railway opened in 2014 and has two passenger stations in Rudong County: Bingcha and Rudong.

== See also ==
- Shidian, Rudong County
