= Jiangsu Rudong Senior High School =

School in Nantong, Jiangsu, China

Jiangsu Rudong Senior High School (Rudong County, Nantong, Jiangsu) is a high school founded in 1938. It is a state-level senior high school which located in the Yangtze River Delta.
