= Shidian, Rudong County =

Village in Jiangsu, China

Coordinates: 32°21′0.86″N 120°46′46.77″E

Shidian (Chinese: 石甸; pinyin: Shídiàn) is a neighborhood committee in Rudong County, part of Nantong city in Jiangsu Province of China.
