= Hai'an, Xuwen County =

Hai'an 海安镇 Hoion
- Town
- Location in Guangdong
- Coordinates: 20°16′16″N 110°13′37″E
- Country: People's Republic of China
- Province: Guangdong
- Prefecture-level city: Zhanjiang
- County: Xuwen
- Elevation: 11 m (36 ft)
- Time zone: UTC+8 (China Standard)
- Area code: 0759

Hai'an, Xuwen County
- Simplified Chinese: 海安
- Literal meaning: "Safe Sea"
Transcriptions
Standard Mandarin
- Hanyu Pinyin: Hǎi'ān
- Bopomofo: ㄏㄞㄢ
- Gwoyeu Romatzyh: Haian

Hai'an (Chinese: 海安; pinyin: Hǎi'ān) is a town in Xuwen County, Guangdong province, situated at the southern extremity of the Leizhou Peninsula as well as geographic mainland China, facing Haikou on Hainan Island, 29 km (18 mi) away, directly across the Qiongzhou Strait. It is also the southern terminus of China National Highway 207. As of 2011, it has two residential communities (社区) and five villages under its administration.

== See also ==
- List of township-level divisions of Guangdong
