= Rudong railway station =

Railway station in Jiangsu, China

Rudong 如东

General information
- Location: Rudong County, Nantong, Jiangsu; China
- Coordinates: 32°26′52.98″N 121°10′21.73″E
- Operated by: China Railway Shanghai Group
- Line: Hai'an–Yangkou Port railway
- Platforms: 2

History
- Opened: January 16, 2014
Location

Rudong railway station (Chinese: 如东站; pinyin: Rúdōng zhàn) is a railway station in Rudong County, Nantong, Jiangsu, China. It is the terminus for passenger services on the Hai'an–Yangkou Port railway. It was opened on 16 January 2014.

Preceding station	China Railway	Following station
Bencha towards Hai'an	Hai'an–Rudong railway	Terminus
