= Dayu, Jiangsu =

Dayu 大豫镇
- Town
- Location in Jiangsu
- Coordinates: 32°18′33″N 121°17′18″E
- Country: People's Republic of China
- Province: Jiangsu
- Prefecture-level city: Nantong
- County: Rudong County
- Time zone: UTC+8 (China Standard)

Dayu (Chinese: 大豫; pinyin: Dàyù) is a town under the administration of Rudong County, Jiangsu, China. As of 2023, it administers five residential communities: Dayu, Nankan (南坎), Dongling (东凌), Bingfang (兵房), Dayu Agricultural Farm Community (大豫镇农场社区), and the following sixteen villages:

- Zhimawa Village (止马洼村)
- Zhoudun Village (周墩村)
- Yudong Village (豫东村)
- Xiangtai Village (香台村)
- Donggang Village (东港村)
- Jiulong Village (九龙村)
- Gongwang Village (巩王村)
- Datong Village (大同村)
- Dingjiadian Village (丁家店村)
- Dong'anzha Village (东安闸村)
- Xuzheng Village (徐征村)
- Majiadian Village (马家店村)
- Qiangmin Village (强民村)
- Yimenzha Village (一门闸村)
- Bo'an Village (伯安村)
- Zhadong Village (闸东村)
