= Bencha railway station =

Railway station in Jiangsu, China

Bencha 栟茶

General information
- Location: Rudong County, Nantong, Jiangsu; China
- Coordinates: 32°30′2.79″N 120°52′35.45″E
- Operated by: China Railway Shanghai Group
- Line: Hai'an–Yangkou Port railway
- Platforms: 1

History
- Opened: January 16, 2014
Location

Bencha railway station (Chinese: 栟茶站; pinyin: Bēnchá zhàn) is a railway station in Rudong County, Nantong, Jiangsu, China. It is an intermediate station on the Hai'an–Yangkou Port railway. The station was opened on 16 January 2014. It has a passenger service and a single freight siding.

Preceding station	China Railway	Following station
Hai'an Terminus	Hai'an–Rudong railway	Rudong Terminus
