= Chahe, Rudong County =

Chahe 岔河镇
- Town
- Location in Jiangsu
- Coordinates: 32°21′8″N 120°55′11″E
- Country: People's Republic of China
- Province: Jiangsu
- Prefecture-level city: Nantong
- County: Rudong County
- Time zone: UTC+8 (China Standard)

Chahe (Chinese: 岔河; pinyin: Chàhé) is a town in Rudong County, Nantong, Jiangsu.

== Villages ==
As of 2020, it administers the following five residential neighborhoods and 22 villages:

- Yingchun Community (迎春社区)
- Yanchuan Community (燕川社区)
- Zhenbei (镇北)
- Qiguo (其国)
- Guba (古坝)
- Zhenxing Village (振兴村)
- Tangqiao Village (汤桥村)
- Nanqiao Village (南桥村)
- Jinhe Village (金河村)
- Jinqiao Village (金桥村)
- Xingfa Village (兴发村)
- Jinfa Village (金发村)
- Longfa Village (龙发村)
- Xinghe Village (兴河村)
- Yinhe Village (银河村)
- Xinba Village (新坝村)
- Xinqiao Village (新桥村)
- Zhenhe Village (振河村)
- Xingbei Village (兴北村)
- Xingang Village (新港村)
- Gubei Village (古北村)
- Lugang Village (陆港村)
- Qixiu Village (启秀村)
- Badong Village (坝东村)
- Sanlian Village (三联村)
- Longfeng Village (龙凤村)
- Yulin Village (玉林村)
