= Hai'an–Yangkou Port railway =

Railway line in Jiangsu, China

Overview
- Status: Operational
- Termini: Hai'an; Beiyu (fright) Rudong (passenger)
- Stations: 5 (3 for passenger)

Service
- Type: Heavy rail

Technical
- Line length: 77 km (48 mi)
- Track gauge: 1,435 mm (4 ft 8 1/2 in) standard gauge
- Electrification: None
- Operating speed: 120 km/h (75 mph)

The Hai'an–Yangkou Port railway (Chinese: 海洋铁路; pinyin: Hǎi-Yáng tiělù), also known as Rudong railway (Chinese: 如东铁路; pinyin: Rúdōng tiělù), is a single-track railway branch in Nantong, Jiangsu Province, China. The combined passenger and freight line is 77 kilometres (47.8 mi) long and has a design speed of 120 kilometres per hour (74.6 mph).

== History ==
Construction began in 2008. The line was completed in 2012. Passenger service began on 16 January 2014. The line was designed to allow electrification and speeds of up to 160 kilometres per hour (99.4 mph) in the future.

== Route ==
The line diverges from the Nanjing–Qidong railway south of Hai'an railway station and continues east.

== Stations ==
- Hai'an
- Xichang (freight)
- Bencha
- Rudong
- Beiyu (freight)
