= Haikou Port New Seaport =

Coordinates: 20°03′16″N 110°09′22″E

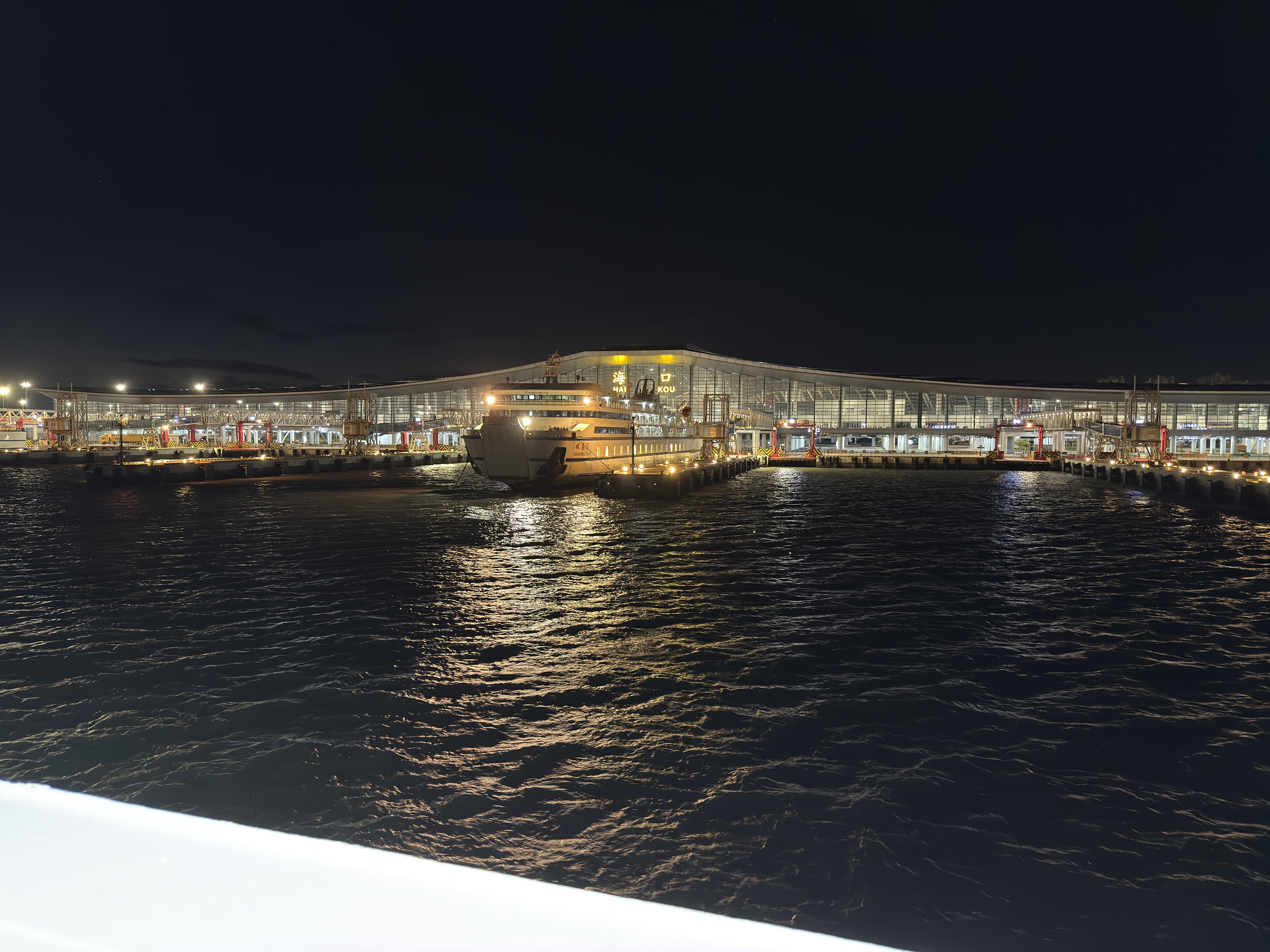
- Interactive map of Haikou Port New Seaport

Location
- Country: China
- Location: Qiongzhou Strait at Haikou, Hainan Province

Details
- Opened: November 27, 2015
- No. of berths: 18

Haikou Port New Seaport is a seaport located around 1 km north of South Port, Haikou, Hainan, China. It has 8 passenger and cargo berths, and a capacity for one million vehicles and 6 million passengers annually. It will become the main port receiving ships from Guangdong. The project began construction on December 25, 2015. It officially opened January 26, 2017. The total investment in the project is 3.8 billion yuan.

In 2022, the Haikou International Duty-Free City Shopping Complex opened about 100 metres southeast of the port.

== Destinations ==
Destination	Terminal Name; English (Chinese)
Xuwen County, Zhanjiang	Xuwen Port (徐闻港)
Beihai	Beihai International Passenger Port (北海国际客运港)
Fangchenggang	Fangchenggang Ma'anling Cruise Terminal (防城港马鞍岭旅游码头)

== Gallery ==
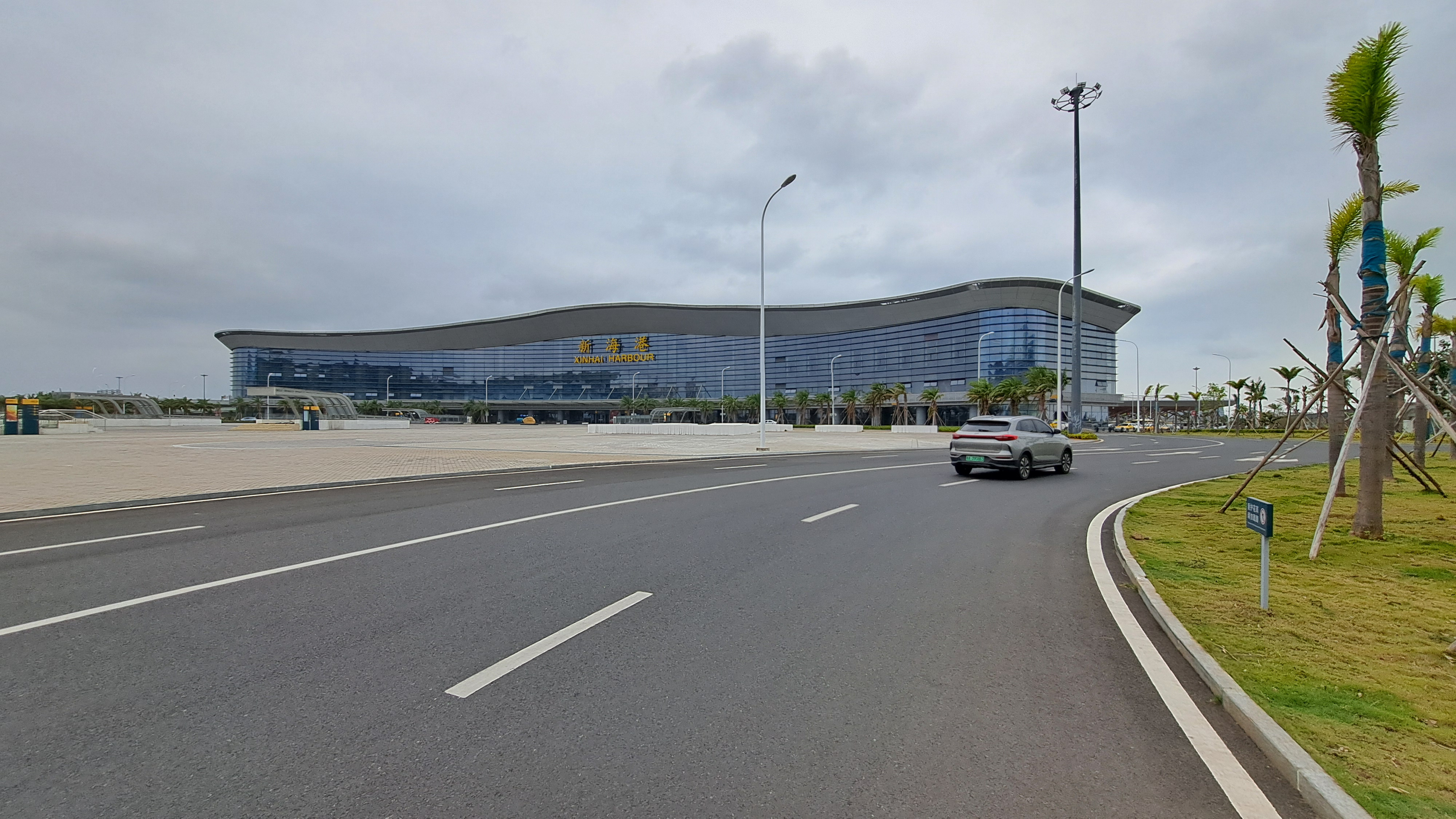
Main building

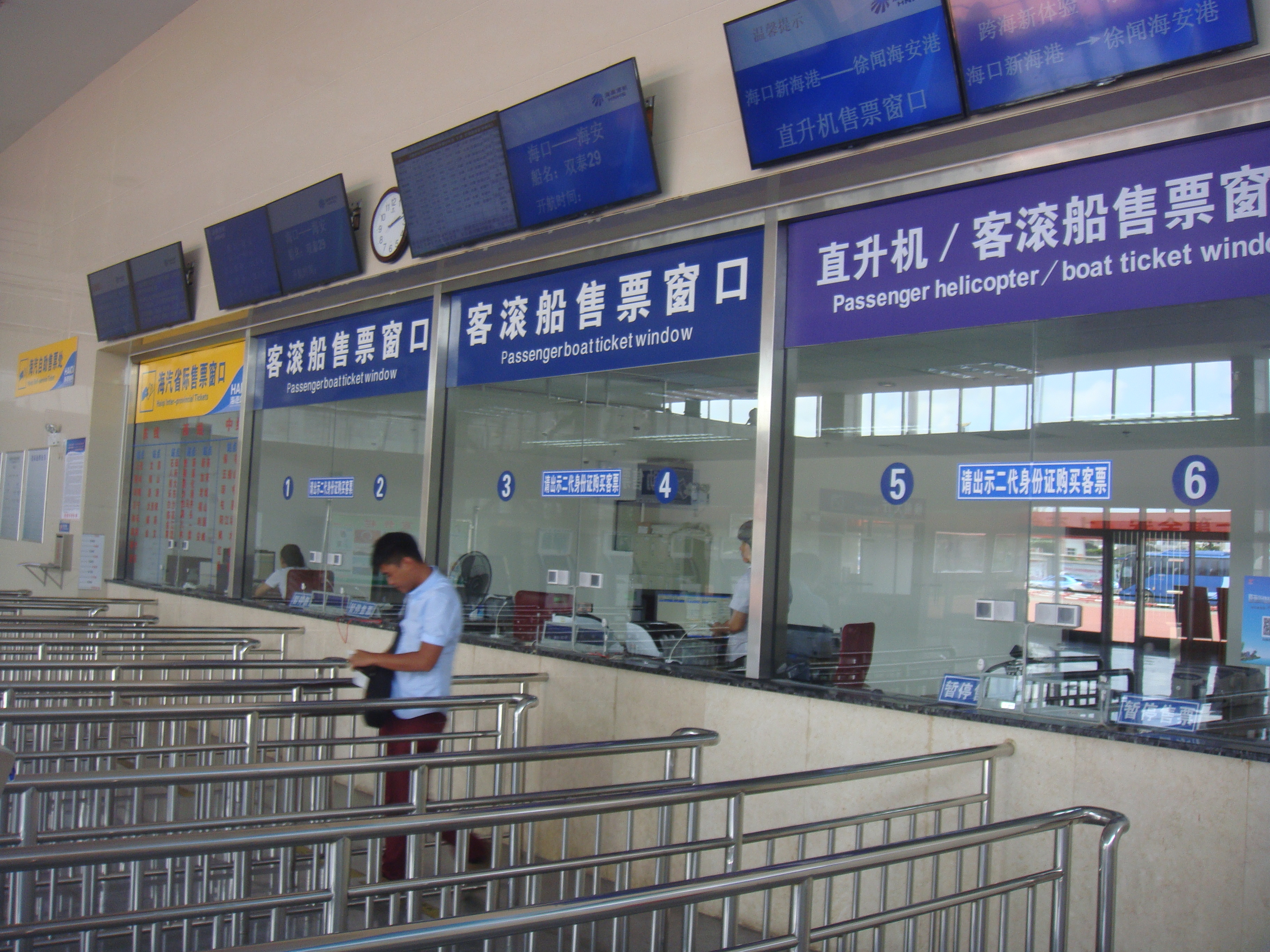
Ticket windows

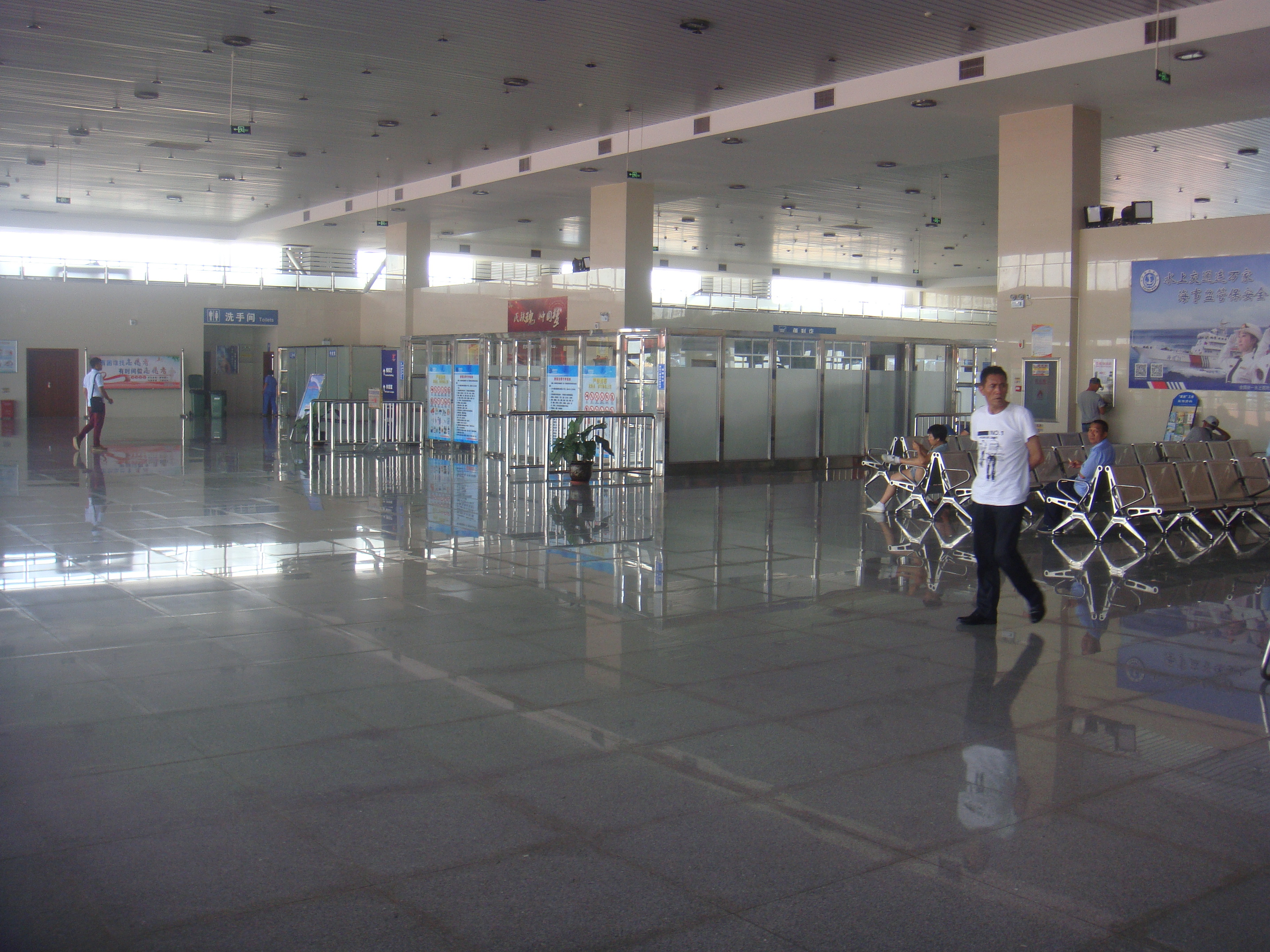
Waiting area

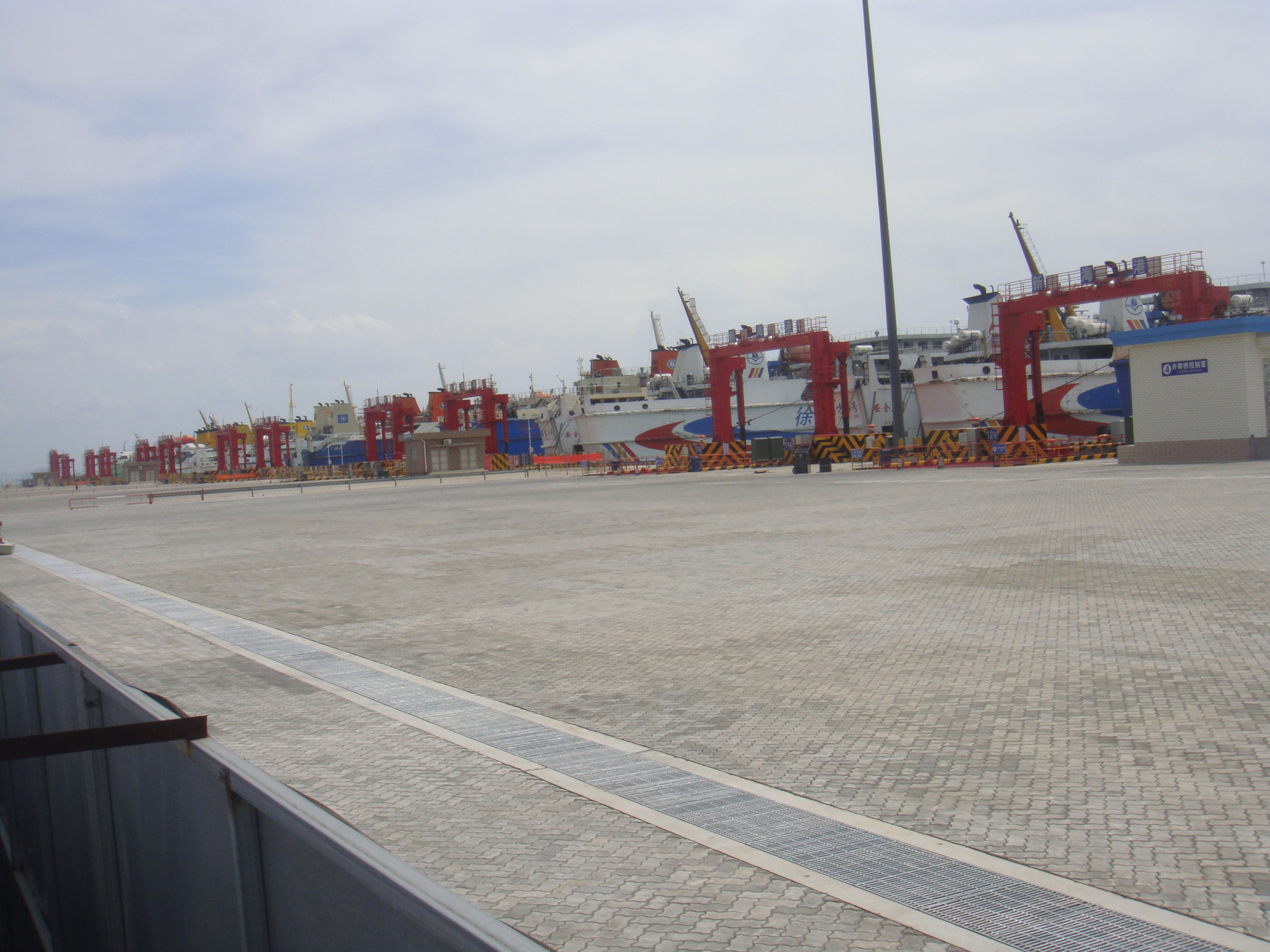
Docks
