= Haikou Transportation Center =

Bus Terminal serving the city of Haikou, China

Coordinates: 19.98173°N 110.34421°E

Haikou Transportation Center 海口汽车客运总站
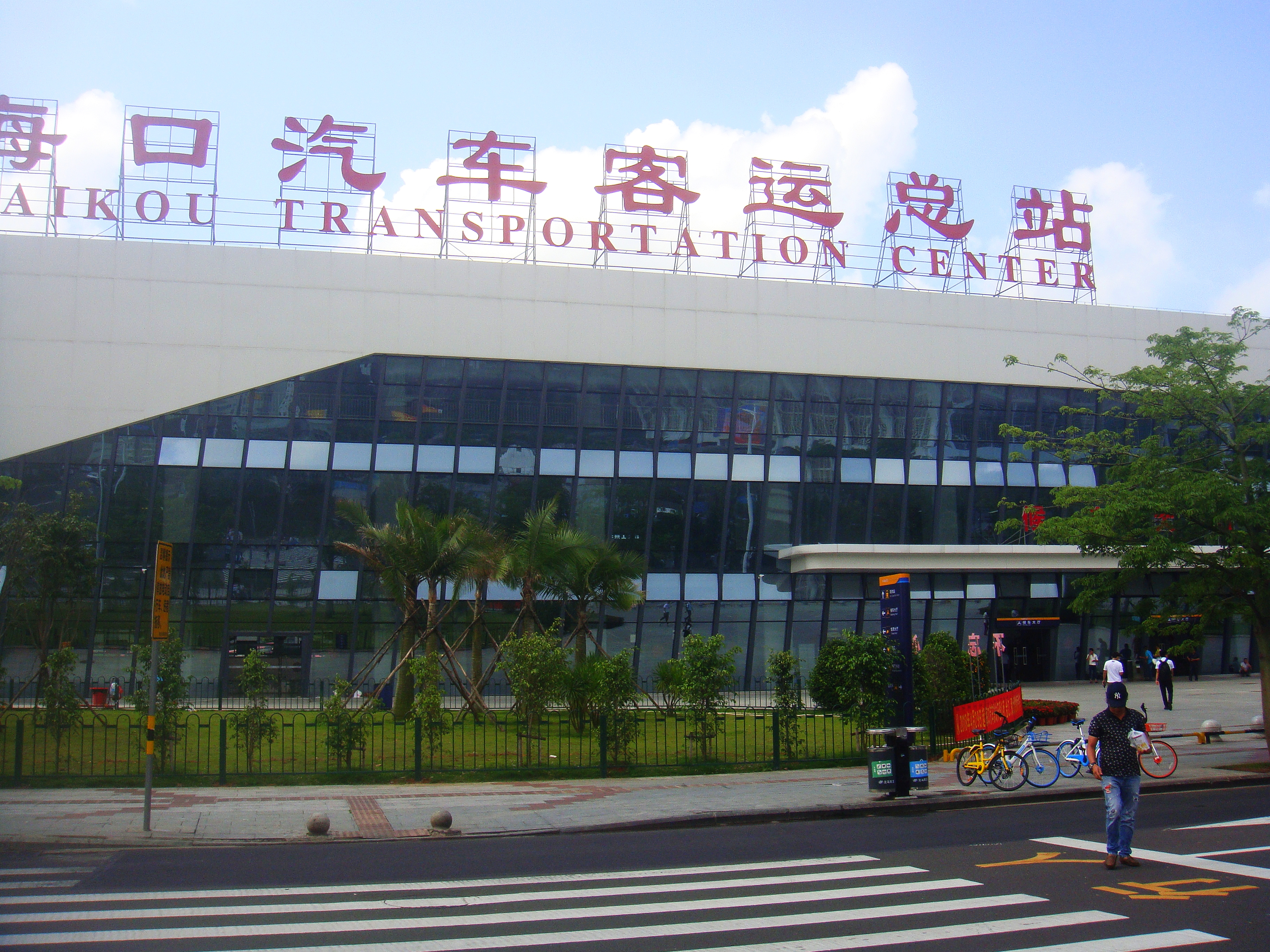

General information
- System: Inter-city bus station

Construction
- Structure type: At-grade

History
- Opened: October 2017

Passengers
- 20,000/day capacity
Location

Haikou Transportation Center (Chinese: 海口汽车客运总站), also known as Haikou Bus terminal, is the main bus station serving Haikou, Hainan, China. It is located across the road from Haikou East railway station's south side. It was built during 2017 and opened in October of that year. The main bus station was once called Haikou South Station, and was located on Nanhai Road around 1.5 km northwest of Haikou East railway station.

The site covers an area of about 60,000 square meters and has a capacity of about 20,000 people per day.

== Interior ==
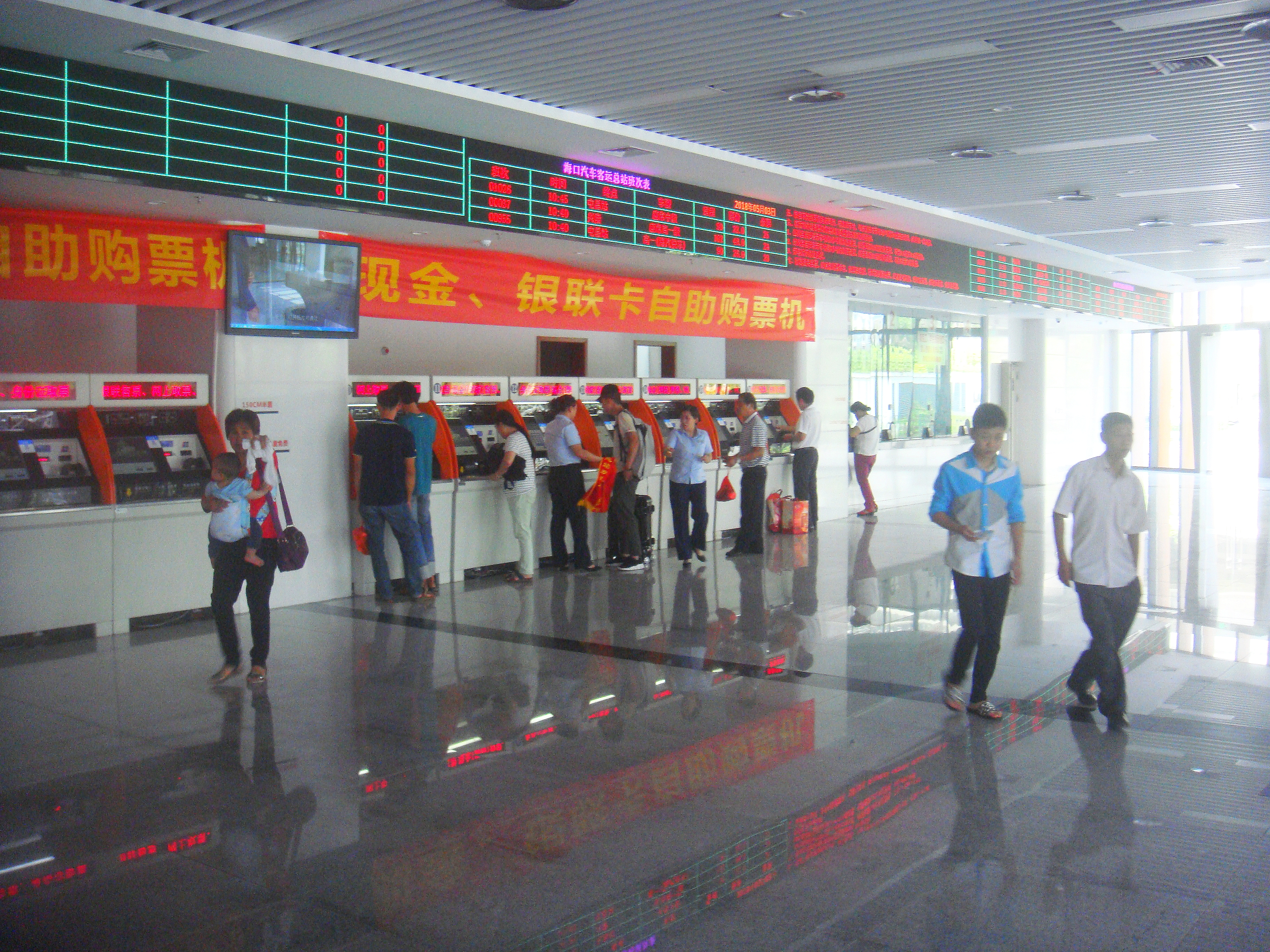
The ticket hall at Haikou Transportation Center

There are numerous automatic ticket machines as well as a wicket in the ticket hall. The security checkpoint to enter the bus area has an x-ray machine. The second floor has several restaurants.
