= Xuwen County =

Xuwen 徐闻县 Suwen; Tsuimun
- County
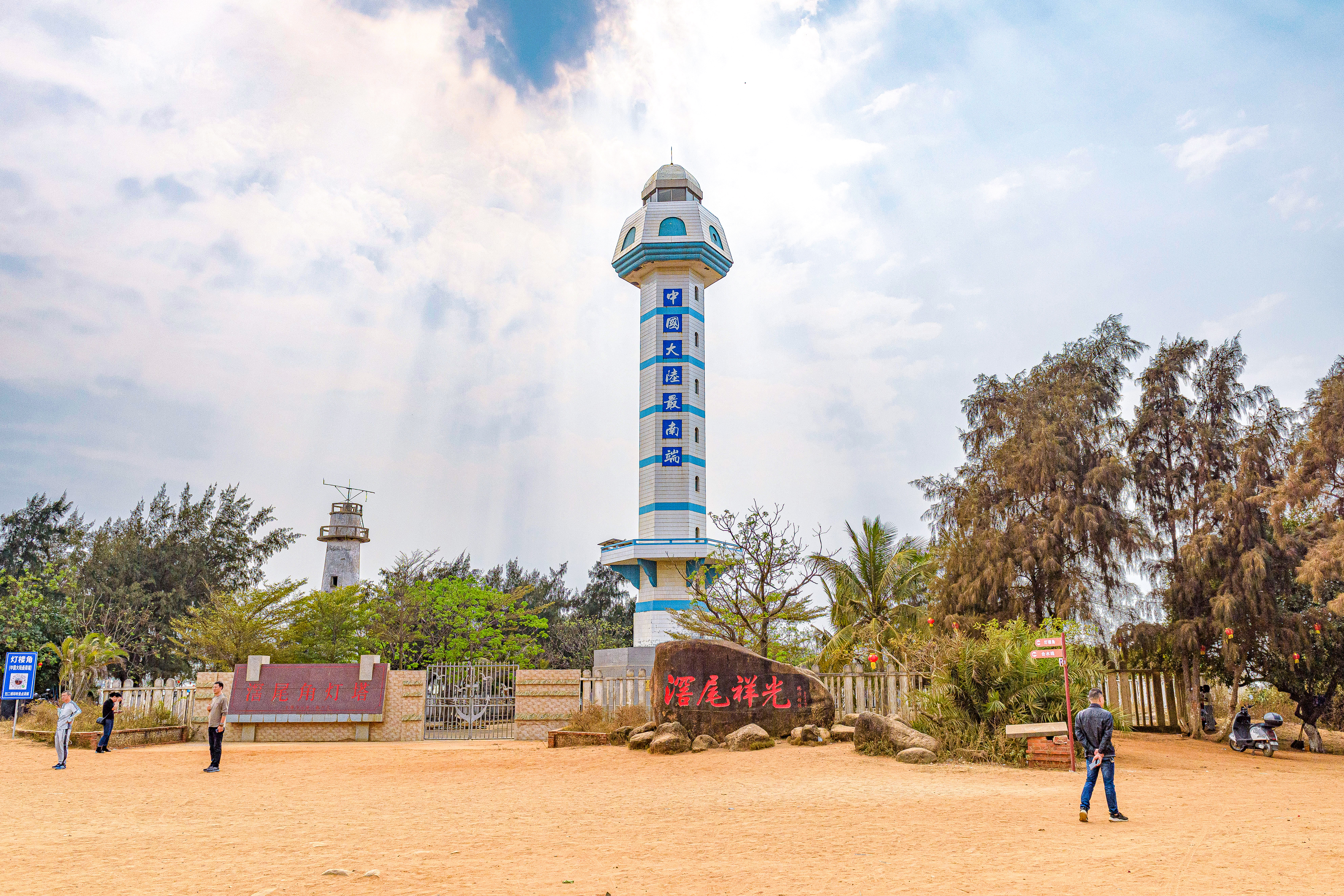

- Location of the seat in Guangdong
- Coordinates: 20°19′30″N 110°10′37″E
- Country: People's Republic of China
- Province: Guangdong
- Prefecture-level city: Zhanjiang

Area
  - Total: 1,800 km^{2} (690 sq mi)

Population (2020)
  - Total: 633,258
  - Density: 350/km^{2} (910/sq mi)
- Time zone: UTC+8 (China Standard)

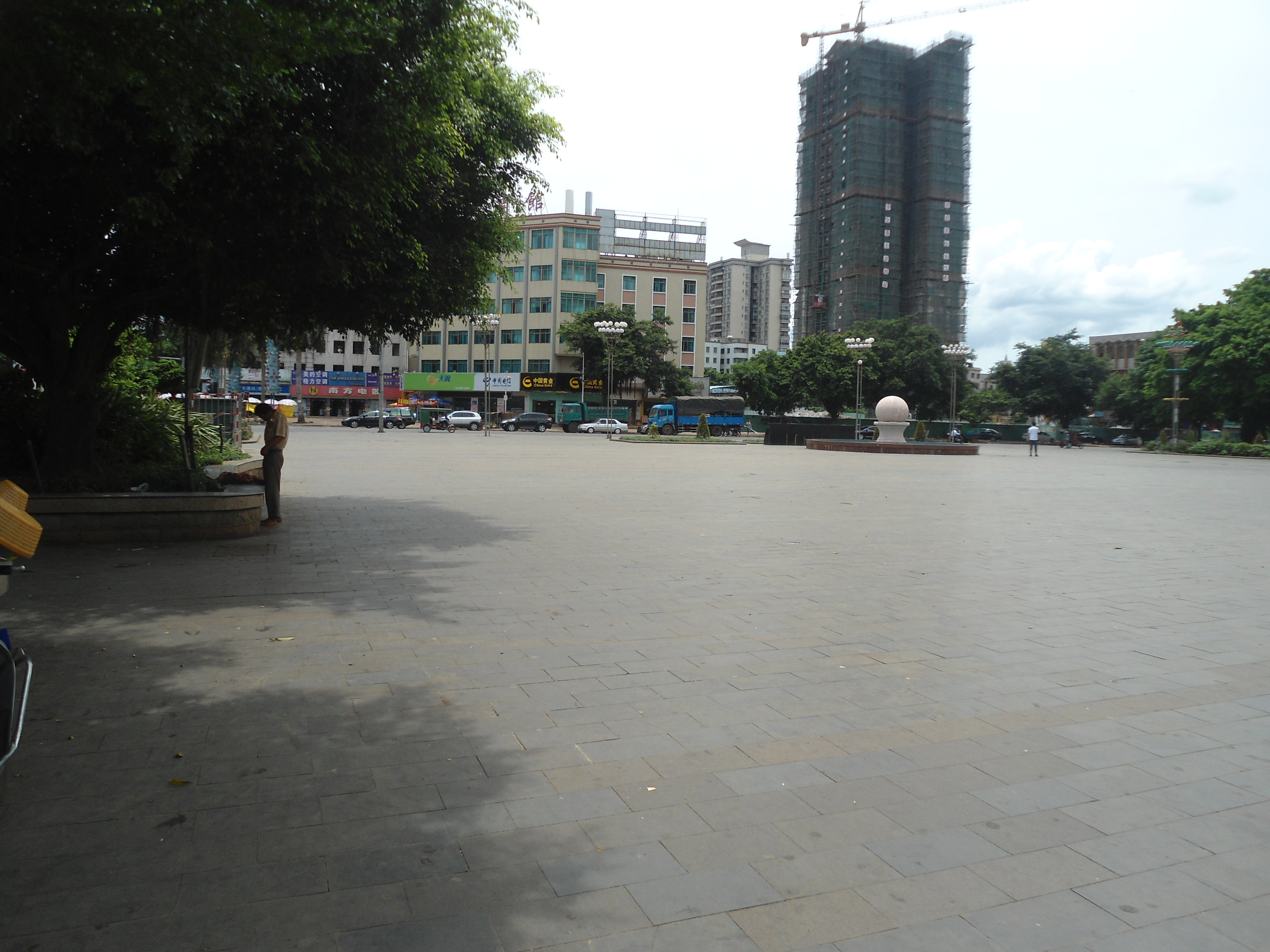
Main square at Xucheng

Xuwen County (postal: Tsuimen or Suwen; simplified Chinese: 徐闻县; traditional Chinese: 徐聞縣; pinyin: Xúwén Xiàn) is a county in the southwest of Guangdong Province, China. It is under the administration of Zhanjiang city.

== Geography ==
Xuwen County is the southernmost county of Guangdong Province, at the southern end of the Leizhou Peninsula. It is located in the southernmost part of the mainland of China; bordering the South China Sea in the east and Beibu Gulf in the west; being separated from Hainan by the 18-nautical-mile (33 km) wide Qiongzhou Strait. Its Coastline is 372 kilometers.

== Climate ==
Climate data for Xuwen, elevation 11 m (36 ft), (1991–2020 normals, extremes 1967–present)
Month	Jan	Feb	Mar	Apr	May	Jun	Jul	Aug	Sep	Oct	Nov	Dec	Year
Record high °C (°F)	31.2 (88.2)	34.2 (93.6)	37.3 (99.1)	39.7 (103.5)	38.7 (101.7)	37.2 (99.0)	37.5 (99.5)	37.1 (98.8)	35.8 (96.4)	34.0 (93.2)	33.2 (91.8)	30.4 (86.7)	39.7 (103.5)
Mean daily maximum °C (°F)	21.0 (69.8)	22.6 (72.7)	26.1 (79.0)	29.7 (85.5)	32.4 (90.3)	33.5 (92.3)	33.3 (91.9)	32.4 (90.3)	31.0 (87.8)	28.9 (84.0)	26.0 (78.8)	22.2 (72.0)	28.3 (82.9)
Daily mean °C (°F)	17.2 (63.0)	18.6 (65.5)	21.7 (71.1)	25.1 (77.2)	27.7 (81.9)	29.1 (84.4)	29.0 (84.2)	28.4 (83.1)	27.2 (81.0)	25.1 (77.2)	22.2 (72.0)	18.4 (65.1)	24.1 (75.5)
Mean daily minimum °C (°F)	14.7 (58.5)	16.2 (61.2)	19.0 (66.2)	22.2 (72.0)	24.7 (76.5)	26.1 (79.0)	26.1 (79.0)	25.6 (78.1)	24.6 (76.3)	22.4 (72.3)	19.6 (67.3)	15.9 (60.6)	21.4 (70.6)
Record low °C (°F)	2.2 (36.0)	4.8 (40.6)	4.8 (40.6)	12.5 (54.5)	16.9 (62.4)	20.6 (69.1)	22.2 (72.0)	22.3 (72.1)	17.9 (64.2)	13.4 (56.1)	7.1 (44.8)	3.5 (38.3)	2.2 (36.0)
Average precipitation mm (inches)	11.8 (0.46)	17.9 (0.70)	32.6 (1.28)	67.5 (2.66)	107.8 (4.24)	147.0 (5.79)	209.5 (8.25)	291.3 (11.47)	238.3 (9.38)	188.3 (7.41)	42.6 (1.68)	28.8 (1.13)	1,383.4 (54.45)
Average precipitation days (≥ 0.1 mm)	5.8	6.1	7.8	7.4	10.4	10.5	13.1	14.8	14.6	9.3	6.1	5.2	111.1
Average relative humidity (%)	84	86	85	83	81	79	79	83	85	82	81	81	82
Mean monthly sunshine hours	114.6	107.4	140.3	170.7	223.3	226.3	242.5	213.2	179.2	192.5	159.1	127.5	2,096.6
Percentage possible sunshine	34	33	38	45	55	57	59	54	49	54	48	38	47
Source: China Meteorological Administration all-time extreme temperaturesall-time October record
