= List of township-level divisions of Hainan =

Location of Hainan province in China

This is a list of township-level divisions of the province of Hainan, People's Republic of China (PRC). After province, prefecture, and county-level divisions, township-level divisions constitute the formal fourth-level administrative divisions of the PRC. There are a total of 222 such divisions in Hainan, divided into 18 subdistricts, 183 towns, and 21 townships.

== Haikou ==
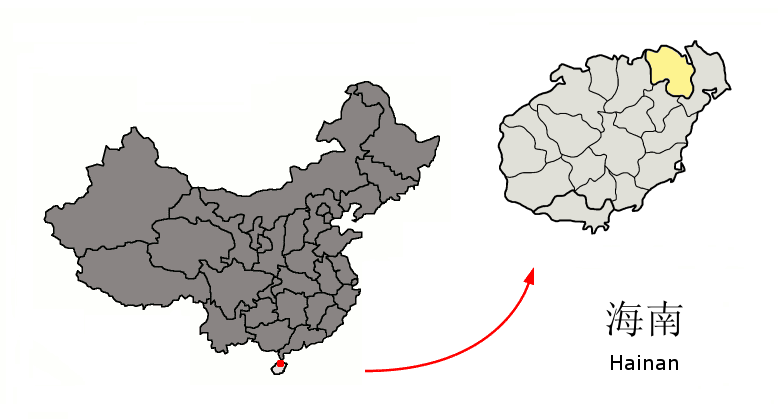
Location of Haikou in the province

=== Longhua District ===
Subdistricts:

- Jinmao Subdistrict (金贸街道), Binhai Subdistrict (滨海街道), Haiken Subdistrict (海垦街道), Jinyu Subdistrict (金宇街道), Zhongshan Subdistrict (中山街道), Datong Subdistrict (大同街道)

Towns:

- Chengxi (城西镇), Longqiao (龙桥镇), Longquan (龙泉镇), Zuntan (遵谭镇), Xinpo (新坡镇)

=== Meilan District ===
Subdistricts:

- Bailong Subdistrict (白龙街道), Lantian Subdistrict (蓝天街道), Haifu Road Subdistrict (海府路街道), Bo'ai Subdistrict (博爱街道), Hepingnan Subdistrict (和平南街道), Baisha Subdistrict (白沙街道), Renmin Road Subdistrict (人民路街道), Haidian Subdistrict (海甸街道), Xinbu Subdistrict (新埠街道)

Towns:

- Lingshan (灵山镇), Yanfeng (演丰镇), Sanjiang (三江镇), Dazhipo (大致坡镇)

=== Qiongshan District ===
Towns:

- Fucheng (府城镇), Longtang (龙塘镇), Yunlong (云龙镇), Hongqi (红旗镇), Jiuzhou (旧州镇), Sanmenpo (三门坡镇), Jiazi (甲子镇), Dapo (大坡镇), Tanwen (谭文镇)

The only subdistrict is Guoxing Subdistrict (国兴街道)

=== Xiuying District ===
Subdistricts:

- Xiuying Subdistrict (秀英街道), Haixiu Subdistrict (海秀街道)

Towns:

- Xixiu (西秀镇), Changliu (长流镇), Haixiu (海秀镇), Shishan (石山镇), Yongxing (永兴镇), Dongshan (东山镇)

== Sanya ==
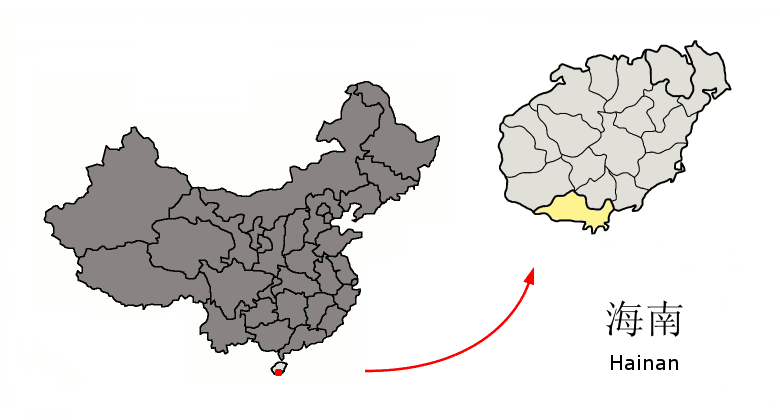
Location of Sanya in the province

=== Jiyang District ===
Former Subdistrict:

- Hedongqu Subdistrict (河东区街道)

Former Towns:

- Jiyang (吉阳镇) also known as Tiandu (田独镇)

=== Tianya District ===
Former Subdistrict:

- Hexiqu Subdistrict (河西区街道)

Former Towns:

- Fenghuang (凤凰镇), Tianya (天涯镇), Yucai (育才镇)

=== Haitang District ===
Former Town:

- Haitangwan (海棠湾镇)

=== Yazhou District ===
Former Towns:

- Yacheng (崖城镇)

== Sansha ==
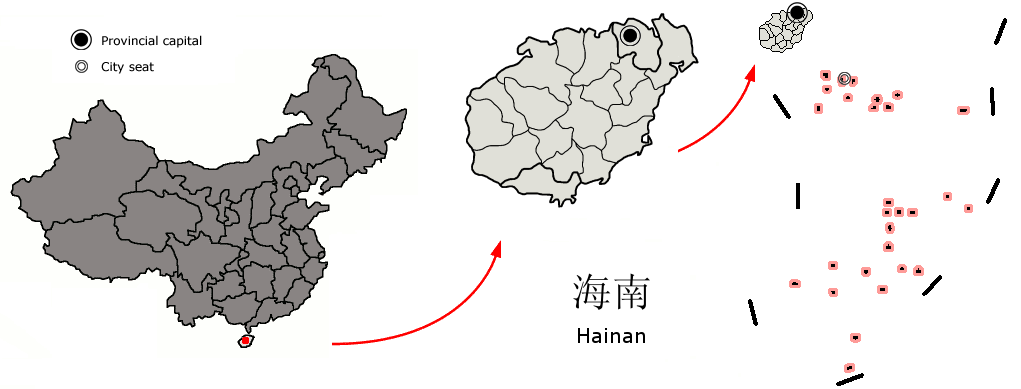
Location of Sansha in the province

Note: The territory of the Sansha is claimed by many countries, including the PRC. The PRC exercises complete control over the Paracels (Xisha), partial control over the Spratlys (Nansha), and no control of the Macclesfield Bank & Scarborough Shoal (Zhongsha).

Towns:

- Yongxing Town Management Area (永兴镇管理区), Qilianyu Management Area (七连屿管理区), Yonglequndao Management Area (永乐群岛管理区)

== Danzhou ==
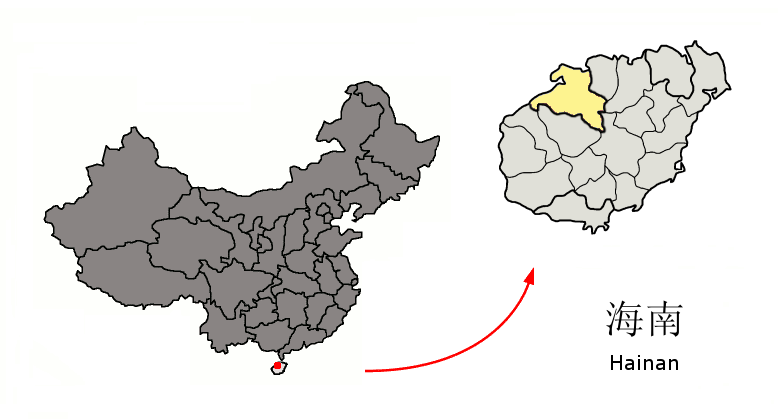
Location of Danzhou in the province

Note: Here, the county-level divisions are absent, so the township-level divisions are at the third level of administration.

Towns:

- Nada (那大镇), Heqing (和庆镇), Nanfeng (南丰镇), Dacheng (大成镇), Yaxing (雅星镇), Lanyang (兰洋镇), Guangcun (光村镇), Mutang (木棠镇), Haitou (海头镇), Eman (峨蔓镇), Sandu (三都镇), Wangwu (王五镇), Baimajing (白马井镇), Zhonghe (中和镇), Paipu (排浦镇), Dongcheng (东成镇), Xinzhou (新州镇)

== County-level divisions under direct provincial administration ==
Unlike the other provinces of the PRC, most of Hainan is directly divided into county-level divisions, and so the township-level divisions below are at the third, rather than fourth, level of administration.

=== Dongfang ===
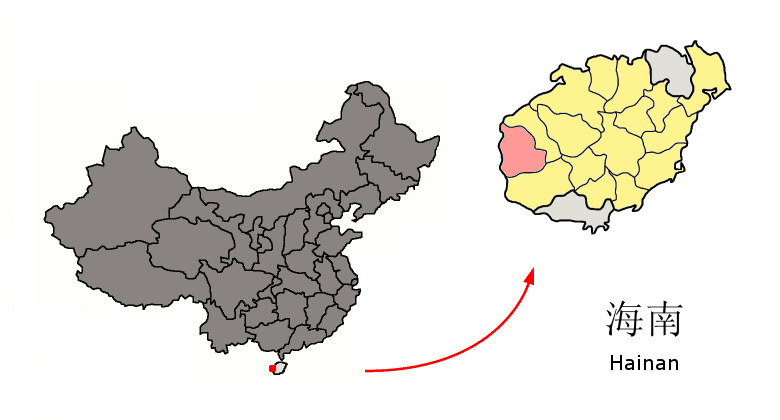
Location of Dongfang in the province

Towns:

- Basuo (八所镇), Donghe (东河镇), Datian (大田镇), Gancheng (感城镇), Banqiao (板桥镇), Sanjia (三家镇), Sigeng (四更镇), Xinlong (新龙镇)

Townships:

- Tian'an Township (天安乡), Jiangbian Township (江边乡)

=== Qionghai ===
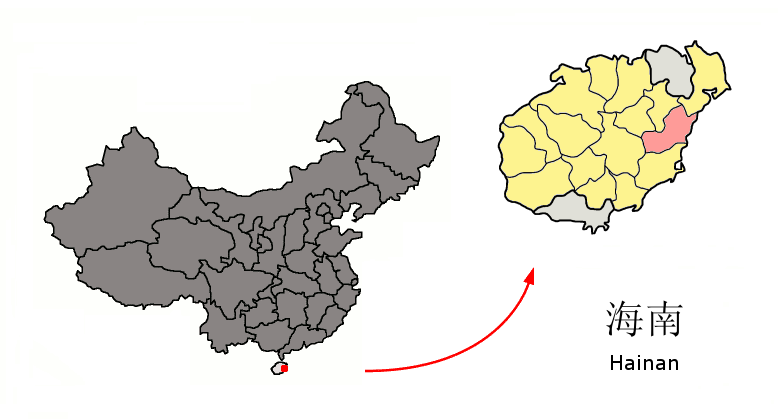
Location of Qionghai in the province

Towns:

- Jiaji (嘉积镇), Wanquan (万泉镇), Shibi (石壁镇), Zhongyuan (中原镇), Bo'ao (博鳌镇), Yangjiang (阳江镇), Longjiang (龙江镇), Tanmen (潭门镇), Tayang (塔洋镇), Changpo (长坡镇), Dalu (大路镇), Huishan (会山镇)

=== Wanning ===
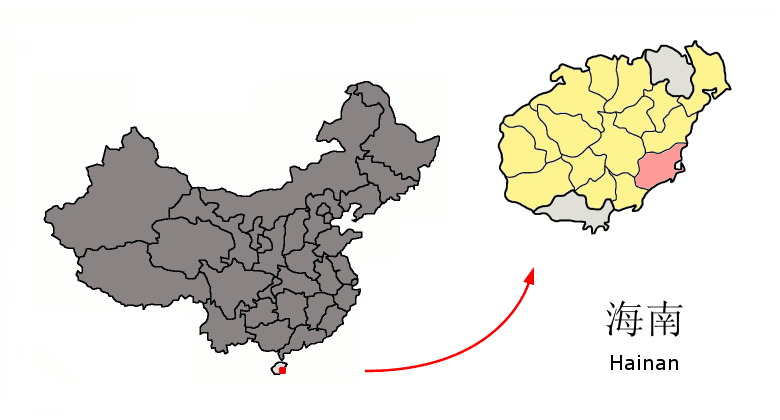
Location of Wanning in the province

Towns:

- Wancheng (万城镇), Longgun (龙滚镇), Shangen (山根镇), Hele (和乐镇), Hou'an (后安镇), Damao (大茂镇), Dong'ao (东澳镇), Liji (礼纪镇), Changfeng (长丰镇), Beida (北大镇), Nanqiao (南桥镇), Sangengluo (三更罗镇)

=== Wenchang ===
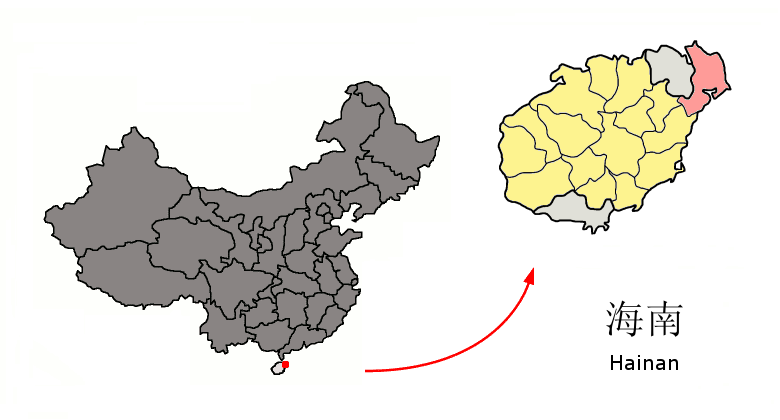
Location of Wenchang in the province

Towns:

- Wenchang (文城镇), Chongxing (重兴镇), Penglai (蓬莱镇), Huiwen (会文镇), Donglu (东路镇), Tanniu (潭牛镇), Dongge (东阁镇), Wenjiao (文教镇), Dongjiao (东郊镇), Longlou (龙楼镇), Changsa (昌洒镇), Wengtian (翁田镇), Baoluo (抱罗镇), Fengpo (冯坡镇), Jinshan (锦山镇), Puqian (铺前镇)

=== Wuzhishan City ===
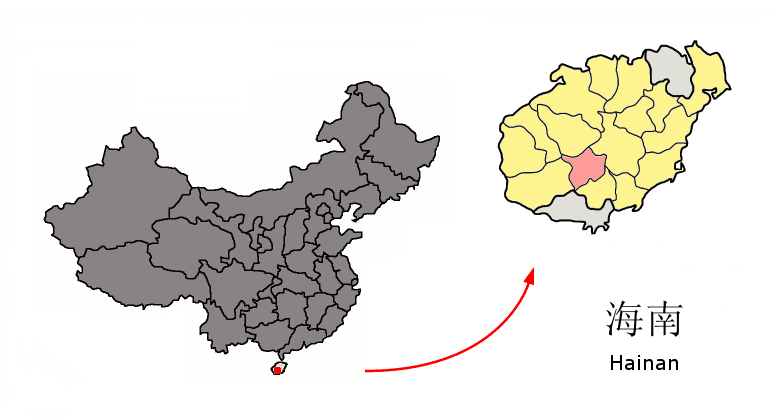
Location of Wuzhishan City in the province

Towns:

- Tongshen (通什镇), Nansheng (南圣镇), Maoyang (毛阳镇), Panyang (番阳镇)

Townships:

- Changhao Township (畅好乡), Maodao Township (毛道乡), Shuiman Township (水满乡)

=== Baisha Li Autonomous County ===
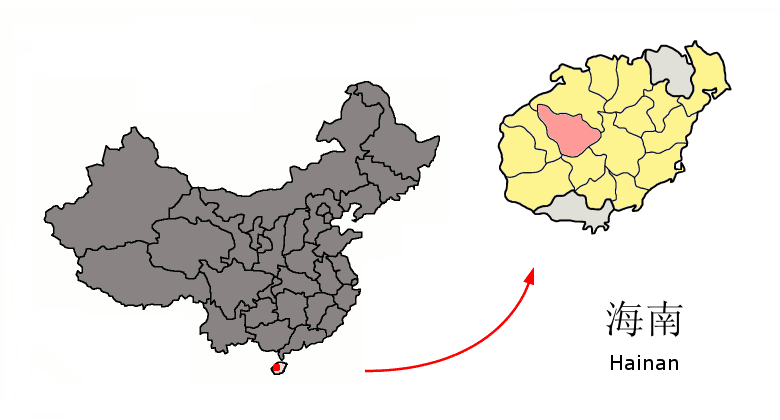
Location of Baisha County in the province

Towns:

- Yacha (牙叉镇), Qifang (七坊镇), Bangxi (邦溪镇), Da'an (打安镇)

Townships:

- Xishui Township (细水乡), Yuanmen Township (元门乡), Nankai Township (南开乡), Fulong Township (阜龙乡), Qingsong Township (青松乡), Jinpo Township (金波乡), Rongbang Township (荣邦乡)

=== Baoting Li and Miao Autonomous County ===
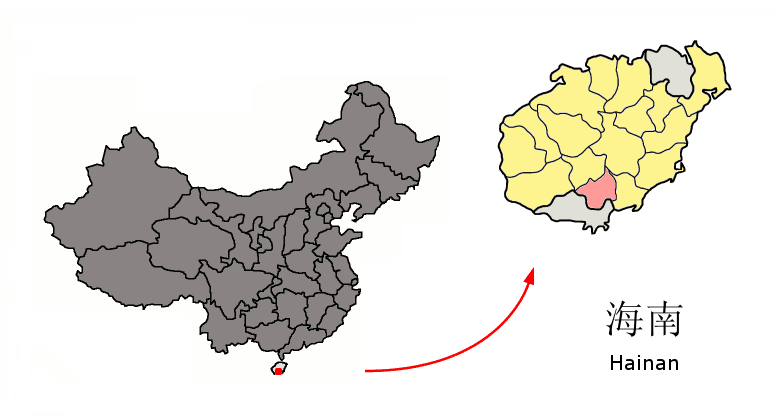
Location of Baoting County in the province

Towns:

- Baocheng (保城镇), Shiling (什玲镇), Jiamao (加茂镇), Xiangshui (响水镇), Xinzheng (新政镇), Sandao (三道镇)

Townships:

- Liugong Township (六弓乡), Nanlin Township (南林乡), Maogan Township (毛感乡)

=== Changjiang Li Autonomous County ===
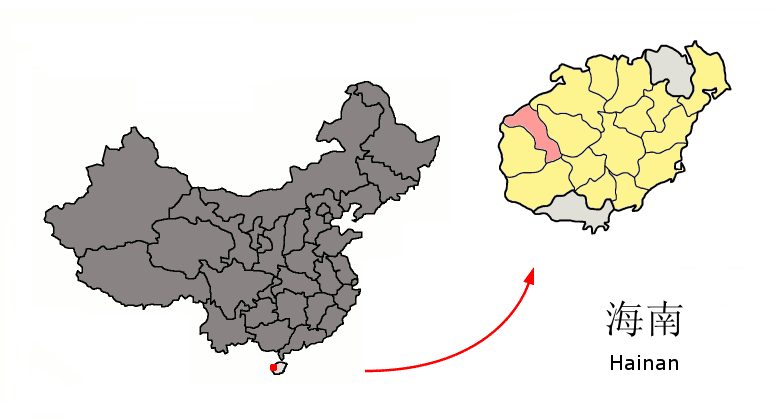
Location of Changjiang County in the province

Towns:

- Shilü (石碌镇), Chahe (叉河镇), Shiyuetian (十月田镇), Wulie (乌烈镇), Changhua (昌化镇), Haiwei (海尾镇), Qicha (七叉镇)

The only township is Wangxia Township (王下乡)

=== Chengmai County ===
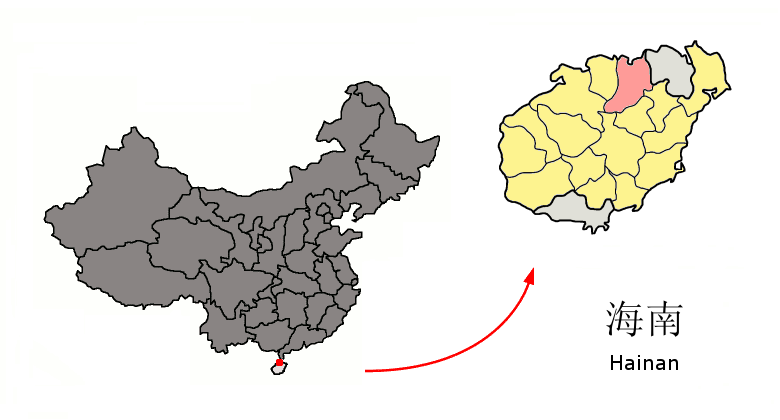
Location of Chengmai County in the province

Towns:

- Jinjiang (金江镇), Laocheng (老城镇), Ruixi (瑞溪镇), Yongfa (永发镇), Jiale (加乐镇), Wenru (文儒镇), Zhongxing (中兴镇), Renxing (仁兴镇), Fushan (福山镇), Qiaotou (桥头镇), Dafeng (大丰镇)

=== Ding'an County ===
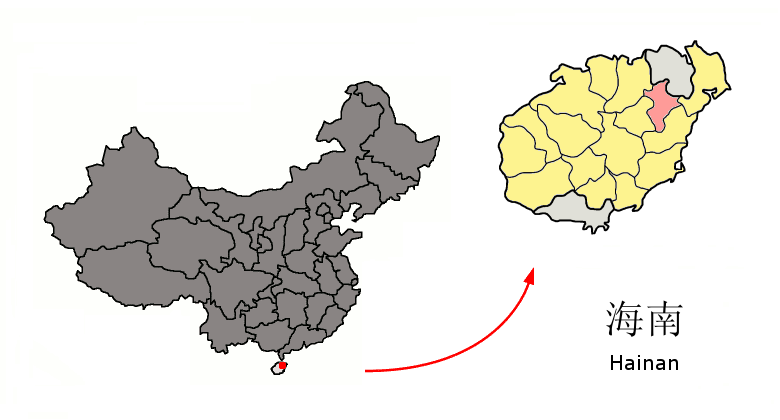
Location of Ding'an County in the province

Towns:

- Dingcheng (定城镇), Xinzhu (新竹镇), Longhu (龙湖镇), Huangzhu (黄竹镇), Leiming (雷鸣镇), Longmen (龙门镇), Longhe (龙河镇), Lingkou (岭口镇), Hanlin (翰林镇), Fuwen (富文镇)

=== Ledong Li Autonomous County ===
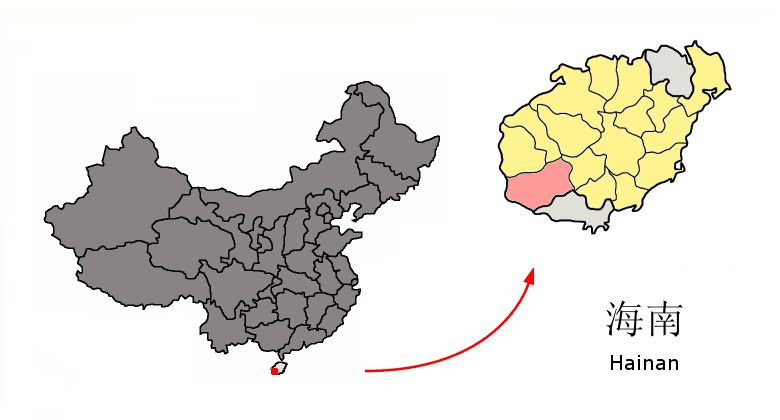
Location of Ledong County in the province

Towns:

- Baoyou (抱由镇), Wanchong (万冲镇), Da'an (大安镇), Zhizhong (志仲镇), Qianjia (千家镇), Jiusuo (九所镇), Liguo (利国镇), Huangliu (黄流镇), Foluo (佛罗镇), Jianfeng (尖峰镇), Yinggehai (莺歌海镇)

=== Lingao County ===
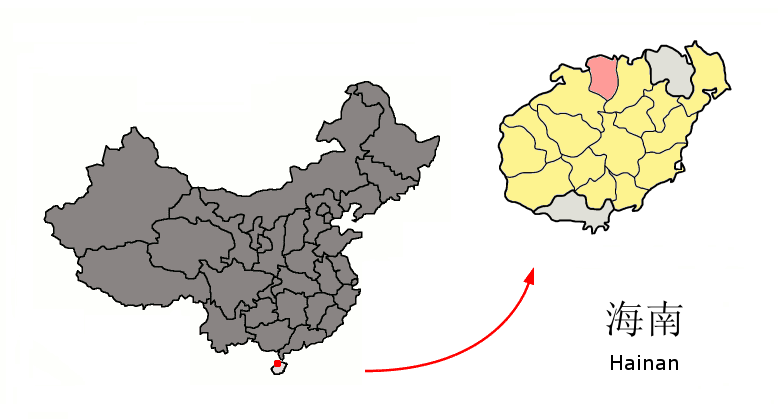
Location of Lingao County in the province

Towns:

- Lincheng (临城镇), Bolian (波莲镇), Dongying (东英镇), Bohou (博厚镇), Huangtong (皇桐镇), Duowen (多文镇), Heshe (和舍镇), Nanbao (南宝镇), Xinying (新盈镇), Tiaolou (调楼镇), Jialai (加来镇)

=== Lingshui Li Autonomous County ===
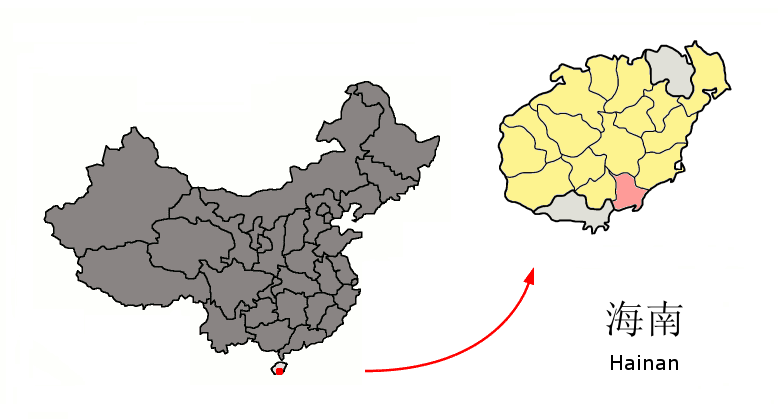
Location of Lingshui County in the province

Towns:

- Yelin (椰林镇), Guangpo (光坡镇), Sancai (三才镇), Yingzhou (英州镇), Longguang (隆广镇), Wenluo (文罗镇), Benhao (本号镇), Xincun (新村镇), Li'an (黎安镇)

Townships:

- Timeng Township (提蒙乡), Qunying Township (群英乡)

=== Qiongzhong Li and Miao Autonomous County ===
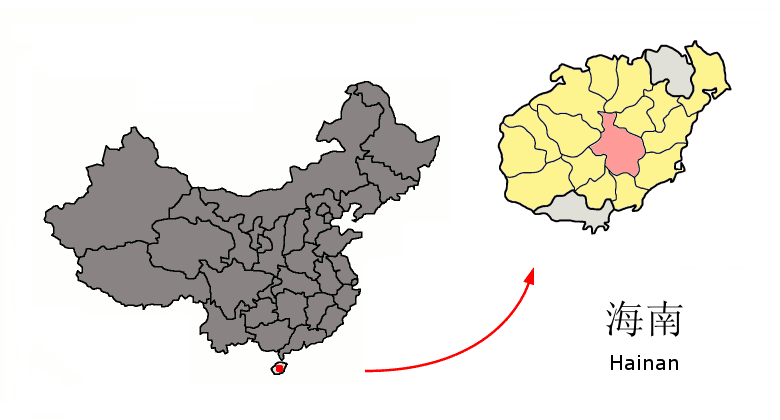
Location of Qiongzhong County in the province

Towns:

- Yinggen (营根镇), Wanling (湾岭镇), Limushan (黎母山镇), Heping (和平镇), Changzheng (长征镇), Hongmao (红毛镇), Zhongping (中平镇)

Townships:

- Diaoluoshan Township (吊罗山乡), Shang'an Township (上安乡), Shiyun Township (什运乡)

=== Tunchang County ===
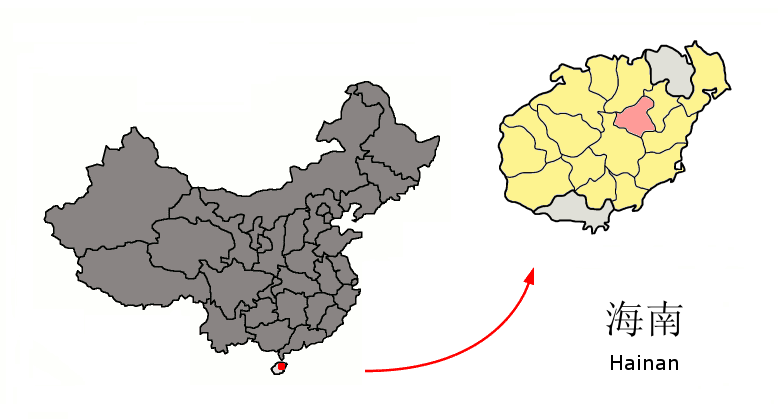
Location of Tunchang County in the province

Towns:

- Tuncheng (屯城镇), Xinxing (新兴镇), Fengmu (枫木镇), Wupo (乌坡镇), Nanlü (南吕镇), Nankun (南坤镇), Poxin (坡心镇), Xichang (西昌镇)

=== Yangpu Economic Development Zone ===
The only subdistricts is Xinganchong District (新干冲区)
