= Jiazi =

Jiazi may refer to:

- Wood Rat, the first item of the sexagenary cycle
- Hwangap
- Jiazi, Lufeng, Guangdong, town in China
- Jiazi, Haikou, town in Hainan, China
