= Huangtong =

Huangtong may refer to:

- Huangtong (皇統; 1141–1149), era name used by Emperor Xizong of Jin

== Places in China ==
- Huangtong Subdistrict (黄桶街道), a subdistrict of Puding County, Guizhou
- Huangtong, Hainan (皇桐), a town in Lingao County, Hainan
- Huangtong Township (黄通乡), a township in Jinxi County, Jiangxi
