= Yongxing =

Yongxing (永兴/永興) may refer to:

== Locations in China ==
- Yongxing County, county in Hunan
- Woody Island (South China Sea), also known as Yongxing Island, one of the Paracel Islands in the South China Sea

=== Subdistricts ===
- Yongxing Subdistrict, Changchun, a subdistrict in Nanguan District, Changchun, Jilin
- Yongxing Subdistrict, Nantong, a subdistrict in Gangzha District, Nantong, Jiangsu
- Yongxing Subdistrict, Wenzhou, a subdistrict in Longwan District, Wenzhou, Zhejiang
- Yongxing Subdistrict, Yakeshi, a subdistrict in Yakeshi, Inner Mongolia

=== Towns ===
- Yongxing, Anhui, a town in Lixin County, Anhui
- Yongxing, Chongqing, a town in Chongqing
- Yongxing, Fujian, a town in Pucheng County, Fujian
- Yongxing, Guizhou, a town in Meitan County, Guizhou
- Yongxing, Hainan, a town in Haikou, Hainan
- Yongxing, Heilongjiang, a town in Mingshui County, Heilongjiang
- Yongxing, Zhengyang County, a town in Zhengyang County, Henan
- Yongxing, Weishi County, a town in Weishi County, Henan
- Yongxing, Hubei, a town in Jingshan County, Hubei
- Yongxing, Inner Mongolia, a town in Liangcheng County, Inner Mongolia
- Yongxing, Chengdu, a town in Chengdu, Sichuan
- Yongxing, Huaying, a town in Huaying, Sichuan
- Yongxing, Kaijiang County, a town in Kaijiang County, Sichuan
- Yongxing, Mianyang, a town in Mianyang, Sichuan
- Yongxing, Mingshan County, a town in Mingshan County, Sichuan
- Yongxing, Suining, a town in Suining, Sichuan
- Yongxing, Yanbian County, a town in Yanbian County, Sichuan
- Yongxing, Yibin County, a town in Yibin County, Sichuan
- Yongxing, Zhongjiang County, a town in Zhongjiang County, Sichuan
- Yongxing, Gansu, a town in Li County, Gansu

=== Townships ===
- Yongxing Dai Township, an autonomous township in Yongren County, Yunnan
- Yongxing Township, Sichuan, a township in Linshui County, Sichuan

== Historical eras ==
- Yongxing (153–154), an era name used by Emperor Huan of Han
- Yongxing (304–306), an era name used by Emperor Hui of Jin
- Yongxing (350–352), an era name used by Ran Min
- Yongxing (357–359), an era name used by Fu Jian (337–385), emperor of Former Qin
- Yongxing (409–413), an era name used by Emperor Mingyuan of Northern Wei
- Yongxing (532), an era name used by Emperor Xiaowu of Northern Wei
