= Renmin Road Subdistrict, Haikou =

Renmin Road Subdistrict 人民路街道
- Subdistrict
- Location in Hainan
- Coordinates: 20.055°N 110.334°E
- Country: China
- Province: Hainan
- Prefecture-level city: Haikou
- District: Meilan District
- Time zone: UTC+8 (China Standard Time)

Renmin Road Subdistrict (Chinese: 人民路街道; pinyin: Rénmínlù Jiēdào) is a subdistrict situated in Meilan District, Haikou, Hainan, China. As of 2020, it administers the following seven residential neighborhoods:

- Yindian Community (银甸社区)
- Bulao Community (捕捞社区)
- Bangdun Community (邦墩社区)
- Lanhai Community (拦海社区)
- Xinli Community (新利社区)
- Wanfu Community (万福社区)
- Meilisha Community (美丽沙社区)

== See also ==
- List of township-level divisions of Hainan
