= Baisha Subdistrict, Haikou =

Baisha Subdistrict 白沙街道
- Subdistrict
- Location in Hainan
- Coordinates: 20°3′6″N 110°21′28″E
- Country: People's Republic of China
- Province: Hainan
- Prefecture-level city: Haikou
- District: Meilan District
- Time zone: UTC+8 (China Standard)

Baisha Subdistrict (Chinese: 白沙街道; pinyin: Báishā Jiēdào) is a subdistrict in Meilan District, Haikou, Hainan, China. As of 2018, it has 4 residential communities under its administration.

== See also ==
- List of township-level divisions of Hainan
