= Jiyang =

Jiyang may refer to:

- Jiyang District, Jinan, Shandong province, China
  - Jiyang Subdistrict, seat of Jiyang County
- Jiyang District, Sanya, Sanya, Hainan province, China
  - Jiyang Town, in Jiyang District
