= Luokan, Hainan =

Luokan 罗坎村
- Village
- Location in Hainan
- Coordinates: 19°01′52″N 109°42′53″E
- Country: People's Republic of China
- Province: Hainan
- County: Qiongzhong
- Town: Hongmao
- Elevation: 383 m (1,257 ft)
- Time zone: UTC+8 (China Standard)
- Area code: 0898

Luokan (simplified Chinese: 罗坎村; traditional Chinese: 羅坎村; pinyin: Luókǎn Cūn) is a village in Hongmao town, Qiongzhong Li and Miao Autonomous County, in central Hainan, China. It is located 13 kilometres (8.1 mi) west of the county seat and just south of China National Highway 224.
