= Sanjiang, Hainan =

Sanjiang 三江镇
- Town
- Location in Hainan
- Coordinates: 19°52′51″N 110°36′07″E
- Country: People's Republic of China
- Province: Hainan
- Prefecture-level city: Haikou
- District: Meilan
- Village-level divisions: 1 residential community 8 villages
- Town created: March 1987
- Elevation: 12 m (39 ft)
- Time zone: UTC+8 (China Standard)
- Postal code: 570203
- Area code: 0898

Sanjiang (Chinese: 三江; pinyin: Sānjiāng; lit. 'three rivers') is a town in Meilan District, in the southeastern suburbs of Haikou, Hainan, People's Republic of China, and is located 16 kilometres (9.9 mi) southeast of Haikou Meilan International Airport. As of 2011, it has one residential community (社区) and eight villages under its administration.

== See also ==
- List of township-level divisions of Hainan
