= Hongmao =

Hongmao 红毛镇
- Town
- Location in Hainan
- Coordinates: 19°01′33″N 109°39′59″E
- Country: People's Republic of China
- Province: Hainan
- County: Qiongzhong
- Village-level divisions: 2 residential communities 11 villages
- Elevation: 320 m (1,050 ft)
- Time zone: UTC+8 (China Standard)
- Postal code: 572933
- Area code: 0898

Hongmao (simplified Chinese: 红毛; traditional Chinese: 紅毛; pinyin: Hóngmáo; lit. 'red hair') is a town of Qiongzhong Li and Miao Autonomous County in the centre of Hainan, located 18 kilometres (11 mi) west of the county seat and situated along China National Highway 224. As of 2018, it had 2 residential communities and 11 villages under its administration.

== See also ==
- List of township-level divisions of Hainan
- Luokan, Hainan
