= Qionghai Bo'ao International Airport =

Qionghai Bo'ao International Airport 琼海博鳌国际机场
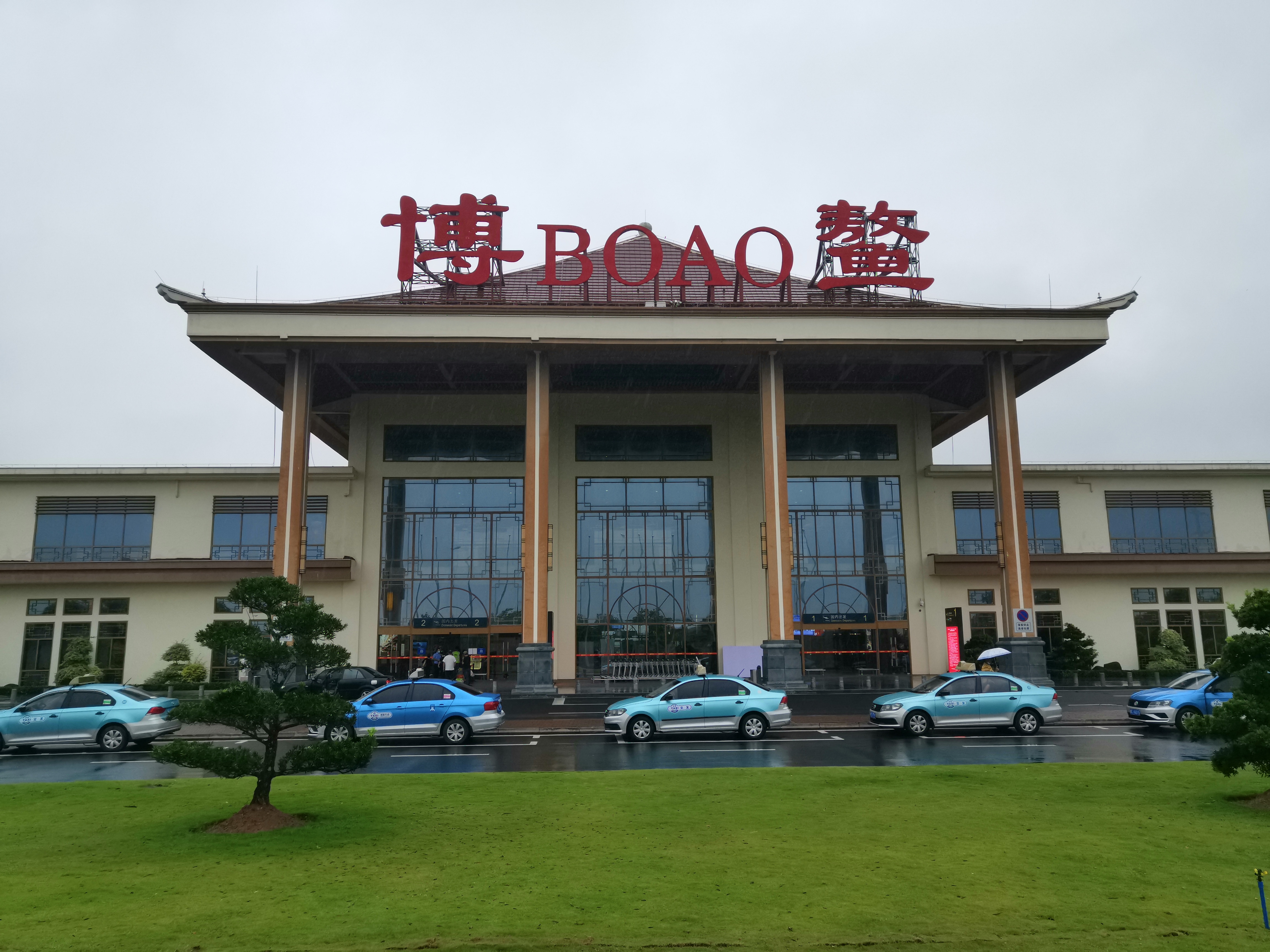
- IATA: BAR; ICAO: ZJQH

Summary
- Airport type: Public
- Serves: Qionghai
- Location: Zhongyuan, Qionghai, Hainan, China
- Opened: 17 March 2016; 10 years ago
- Coordinates: 19°8′26″N 110°27′32″E

Map
- Location in Hainan BAR/ZJQH (China)

Runways
Direction	Length		Surface
Direction	m	ft	Surface
15/33	3,200	10,499

Statistics (2025)
- Passengers: 848,808
- Aircraft movements: 13,281
- Cargo (metric tons): 2,882.4

Qionghai Bo'ao International Airport
- Simplified Chinese: 琼海博鳌国际机场
- Traditional Chinese: 瓊海博鰲國際機場
Transcriptions
Standard Mandarin
- Hanyu Pinyin: Qiónghǎi Bó'áo Guójì Jīchǎng

Qionghai Bo'ao International Airport (IATA: BAR, ICAO: ZJQH) is an airport serving the city of Qionghai, Hainan, China. The airport received the approval for establishment from the national government in January 2013, and was opened in March 2016 after three years of construction. It was approved to be an international airport and was thus renamed in April 2024.

== History ==
The Qionghai airport was built to facilitate travel to the Boao Forum for Asia, an annual political event held 15 kilometres (9.3 mi) away in Boao. The airport also serves rising tourism to the province of Hainan. A feasibility study on the airport was approved by government officials in December 2012, followed by the master plan in May 2013. A groundbreaking ceremony was held on 17 March 2015.

After a test flight in March 2016, the airport received its first commercial flight – a Hainan Airlines Boeing 737 from Beijing – on 17 March 2016. For a short period thereafter, the airport remained open to domestic charter flights carrying Boao Forum attendees. After the forum, the Qionghai airport closed so that a new international terminal and a 600-metre (2,000 ft) runway extension could be completed before the next forum. The airport reopened on 29 December 2016, receiving an Air Guilin flight from Guilin.

The airport was approved to be an international airport and was renamed "Qionghai Bo'ao International Airport" in April 2024.

As of 2025, the airport does not serve international routes, and it only serves domestic flights. Previously, other international carriers operated at the airport, such as Batik Air Malaysia to Kuala Lumpur and Aero K to Seoul.

On 2 September 2026, the airport was officially upgraded from 4C to 4E-class.

== Facilities ==
Qionghai Airport has a 3,200-meter runway capable of handling large jet aircraft, a 9,000 square meter terminal building, and 26 aircraft parking aprons. It is designed to handle 480,000 passengers and 1,440 tons of cargo annually by 2020.

== Airlines and destinations ==
Airlines	Destinations
9 Air	Guangzhou
Air Changan	Xi'an
Air Guilin	Jinan
China Eastern Airlines	Shanghai–Pudong, Wuhan
China Express Airlines	Chongqing, Guiyang, Liuzhou, Zhanjiang
China United Airlines	Kunming, Ordos, Shijiazhuang, Wenzhou
Hainan Airlines	Beijing–Capital, Kuala Lumpur-International
Ruili Airlines	Kunming
