= Jiyang, Sanya =

Jiyang 吉阳区
- District
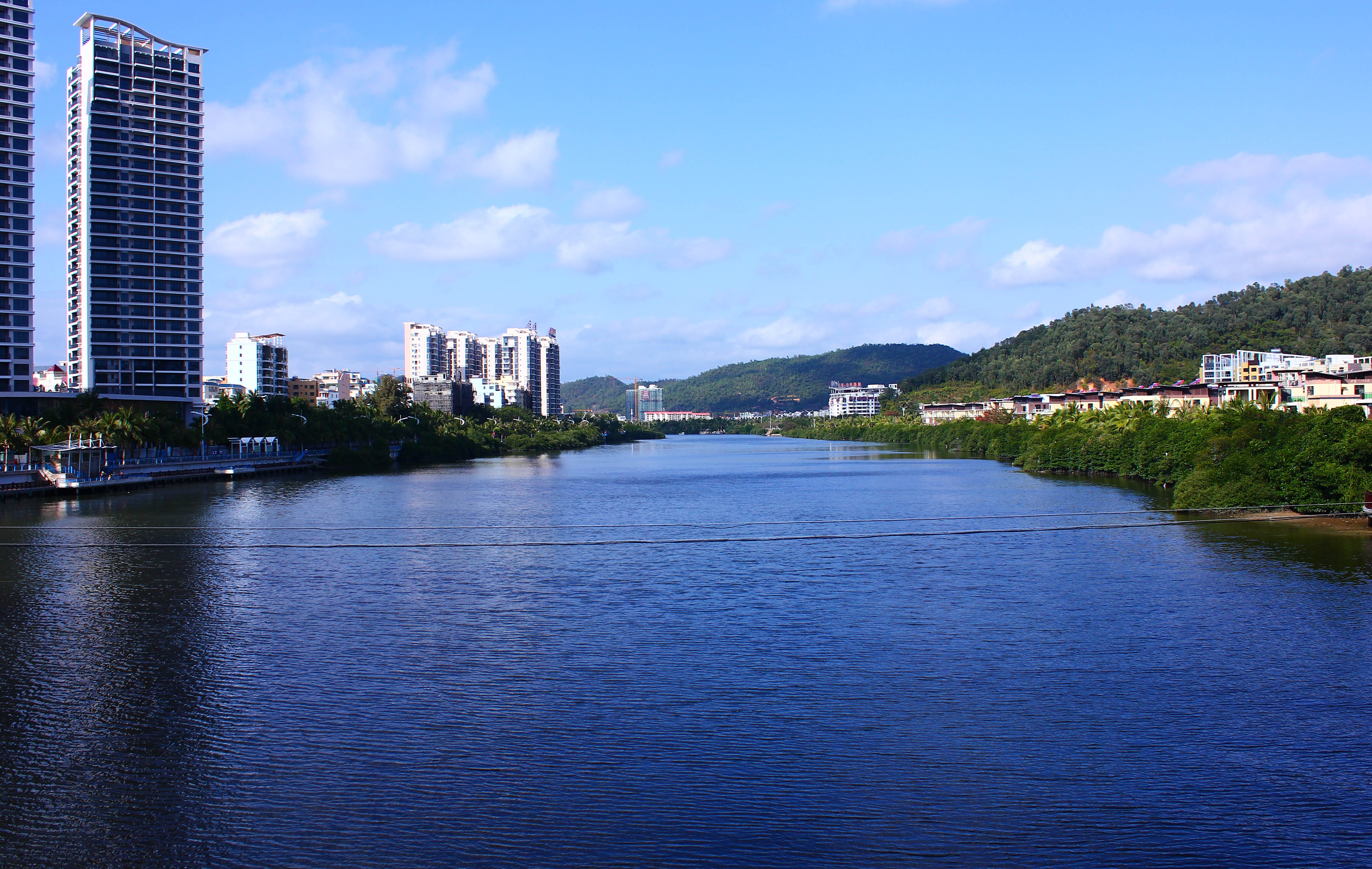

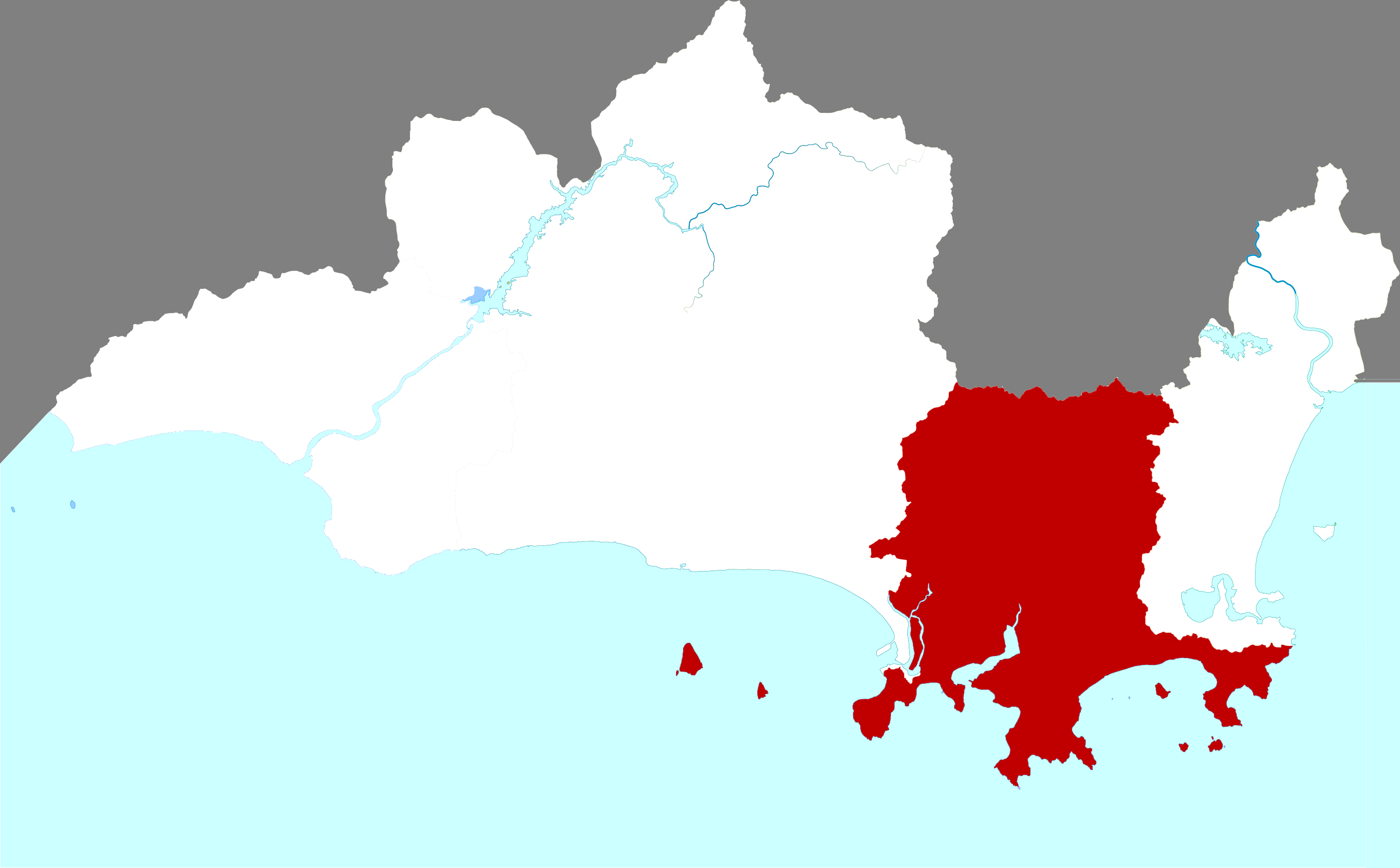
- Location of Jiyang in Sanya

- Location in Hainan
- Coordinates: 18°16′52″N 109°34′41″E
- Country: People's Republic of China
- Province: Hainan
- Prefecture-level city: Sanya

Area
  - Total: 372.61 km^{2} (143.87 sq mi)

Population (2013)
  - Total: 240,000
  - Density: 640/km^{2} (1,700/sq mi)
- Time zone: UTC+8 (China standard time)

Jiyang (simplified Chinese: 吉阳区; traditional Chinese: 吉陽區; pinyin: Jíyáng Qū) is a district under the jurisdiction of Sanya city, in Hainan province, China. The district was established on 12 February 2014.

== Former administrative subdivisions ==
Jiyang has jurisdiction over the former towns and subdistricts of:

| English name | Simplified | Pinyin | Area | Population | Density |
|---|---|---|---|---|---|
| Hedong (Sub)District | 河东区街道办 | Hédōng Qū Jiēdào Bàn | 35 | 147,944 | 4,227 |
| Jiyang | 吉阳镇 | Jíyáng Zhèn | 199 | 92,316 | 464 |
| Nanxin Farm | 国营南新农场 | Guóyíng Nánxīn Nóngchǎng | N.D. | 16,801 | N.D. |

== Climate ==
Climate data for Mount Liudaoling, Jiyang District, elevation 419 m (1,375 ft), (1991–2020 normals)
| Month | Jan | Feb | Mar | Apr | May | Jun | Jul | Aug | Sep | Oct | Nov | Dec | Year |
|---|---|---|---|---|---|---|---|---|---|---|---|---|---|
| Mean daily maximum °C (°F) | 21.6 (70.9) | 22.8 (73.0) | 24.5 (76.1) | 26.8 (80.2) | 29.1 (84.4) | 29.2 (84.6) | 28.5 (83.3) | 28.3 (82.9) | 28.1 (82.6) | 26.4 (79.5) | 24.9 (76.8) | 22.5 (72.5) | 26.1 (78.9) |
| Daily mean °C (°F) | 18.4 (65.1) | 19.4 (66.9) | 21.3 (70.3) | 23.5 (74.3) | 25.6 (78.1) | 26.3 (79.3) | 25.7 (78.3) | 25.6 (78.1) | 25.2 (77.4) | 23.4 (74.1) | 22.0 (71.6) | 19.3 (66.7) | 23.0 (73.4) |
| Mean daily minimum °C (°F) | 16.6 (61.9) | 17.6 (63.7) | 19.6 (67.3) | 21.8 (71.2) | 23.8 (74.8) | 24.5 (76.1) | 23.9 (75.0) | 23.8 (74.8) | 23.3 (73.9) | 21.6 (70.9) | 20.3 (68.5) | 17.4 (63.3) | 21.2 (70.1) |
| Average precipitation mm (inches) | 10.4 (0.41) | 8.4 (0.33) | 21.2 (0.83) | 71.8 (2.83) | 89.6 (3.53) | 178.9 (7.04) | 325.3 (12.81) | 236.9 (9.33) | 326.8 (12.87) | 344.7 (13.57) | 83.2 (3.28) | 19.3 (0.76) | 1,716.5 (67.59) |
| Average precipitation days (≥ 1.0 mm) | 6.3 | 6.0 | 6.5 | 6.8 | 9.4 | 12.5 | 15.8 | 15.5 | 18.4 | 14.7 | 9.8 | 5.5 | 127.2 |
| Average relative humidity (%) | 87 | 90 | 92 | 92 | 91 | 91 | 92 | 91 | 91 | 88 | 87 | 84 | 90 |
| Mean monthly sunshine hours | 158.7 | 140.8 | 137.1 | 154.9 | 191.6 | 172.7 | 178.1 | 167.9 | 160.4 | 166.1 | 161.3 | 165.7 | 1,955.3 |
| Percentage possible sunshine | 46 | 43 | 37 | 41 | 48 | 44 | 44 | 43 | 44 | 46 | 48 | 49 | 44 |
Source: China Meteorological Administration
