= Chengxi, Hainan =

Chengxi 城西镇
- Town
- Location in Hainan
- Coordinates: 19°59′49″N 110°20′15″E
- Country: People's Republic of China
- Province: Hainan
- Prefecture-level city: Haikou
- District: Longhua

Area
  - Total: 33 km^{2} (13 sq mi)
- Elevation: 17 m (56 ft)

Population
  - Total: 66,666
  - Density: 2,000/km^{2} (5,200/sq mi)
- Time zone: UTC+8 (China Standard)
- Postal code: 570206
- Area code: 0898

Chengxi (Chinese: 城西; pinyin: Chéngxī; lit. 'city west') is a town of Longhua District of Haikou, Hainan, People's Republic of China. It has a population of 66,666 residing in an area of 33 square kilometres (13 sq mi). As of 2011, the town administers 6 residential communities (社区) and 9 villages.

== See also ==
- List of township-level divisions of Hainan
