= Wanling =

Wanling 湾岭镇
- Town
- Location in Hainan
- Coordinates: 19°8′35″N 109°53′48″E
- Country: People's Republic of China
- Province: Hainan
- Autonomous county: Qiongzhong Li and Miao Autonomous County
- Time zone: UTC+8 (China Standard)

Wanling (simplified Chinese: 湾岭; traditional Chinese: 灣嶺; pinyin: Wānlǐng) is a town under the administration of Qiongzhong Li and Miao Autonomous County, Hainan, China. As of 2020, it has three residential neighborhoods and 18 villages under its administration:

Neighborhoods

- Wanling
- Wanling Community
- Wushi Community (乌石社区)

Villages

- Wanling Village
- Wushi Village (乌石村)
- Daping Village (大平村)
- Shuiyang Village (水央村)
- Laihao Village (来浩村)
- Lunan Village (录南村)
- Zhonglang Village (中朗村)
- Beipai Village (北排村)
- Dadun Village (大墩村)
- Gaopo Village (高坡村)
- Nanjiu Village (南久村)
- Jiazhang Village (加章村)
- Pozhai Village (坡寨村)
- Mengtianpo Village (孟田坡村)
- Xinzai Village (新仔村)
- Yapo Village (鸭坡村)
- Lingmen Village (岭门村)
- Xinpo Village (新坡村)
