= Yinggen =

Yinggen 营根镇
- Town
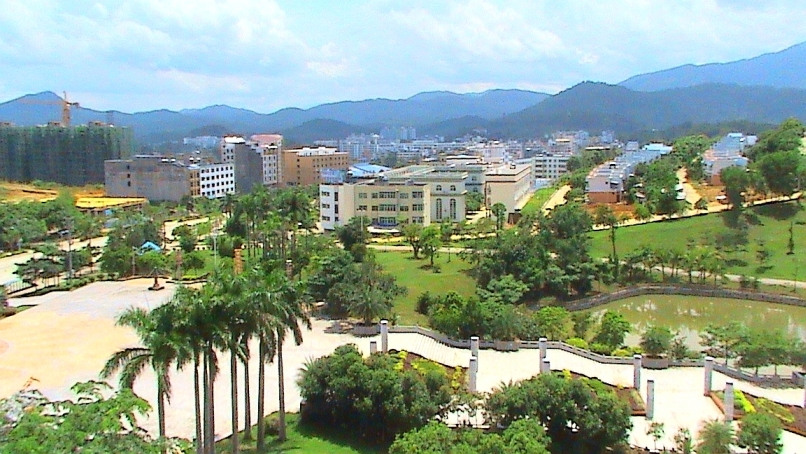
- View from the eastern edge of the town

- Location in Hainan
- Coordinates: 19°02′14″N 109°49′42″E
- Country: People's Republic of China
- Province: Hainan
- County: Qiongzhong
- Village-level divisions: 5 residential communities 16 villages
- Elevation: 231 m (758 ft)
- Time zone: UTC+8 (China Standard)
- Postal code: 572900
- Area code: 0898

Yinggen (simplified Chinese: 营根; traditional Chinese: 營根; pinyin: Yínggēn) is a town and the seat of Qiongzhong Li and Miao Autonomous County in the centre of Hainan. As of 2018, it had 5 residential communities (社区) and 16 villages under its administration. The Baihuashan Waterfall is located nearby.

== See also ==
- List of township-level divisions of Hainan
