= Yongxing, Hainan =

Coordinates: 19.8941°N 110.2643°E

Yongxing 永兴镇
- Town

Chinese transcription(s)
- Interactive map of Yongxing
- Country: China
- Province: Hainan
- Prefecture: Haikou
- District: Xiuying District
- Time zone: UTC+8 (China Standard Time)

Yongxing (Chinese: 永兴; pinyin: Yǒngxīng) is a township-level division situated in Xiuying District, Haikou, Hainan, China.

== See also ==
- List of township-level divisions of Hainan
