= Hele, Hainan =

Coordinates: 18.906°N 110.481°E

Hele, Wanning
- Subdistrict

Chinese transcription(s)
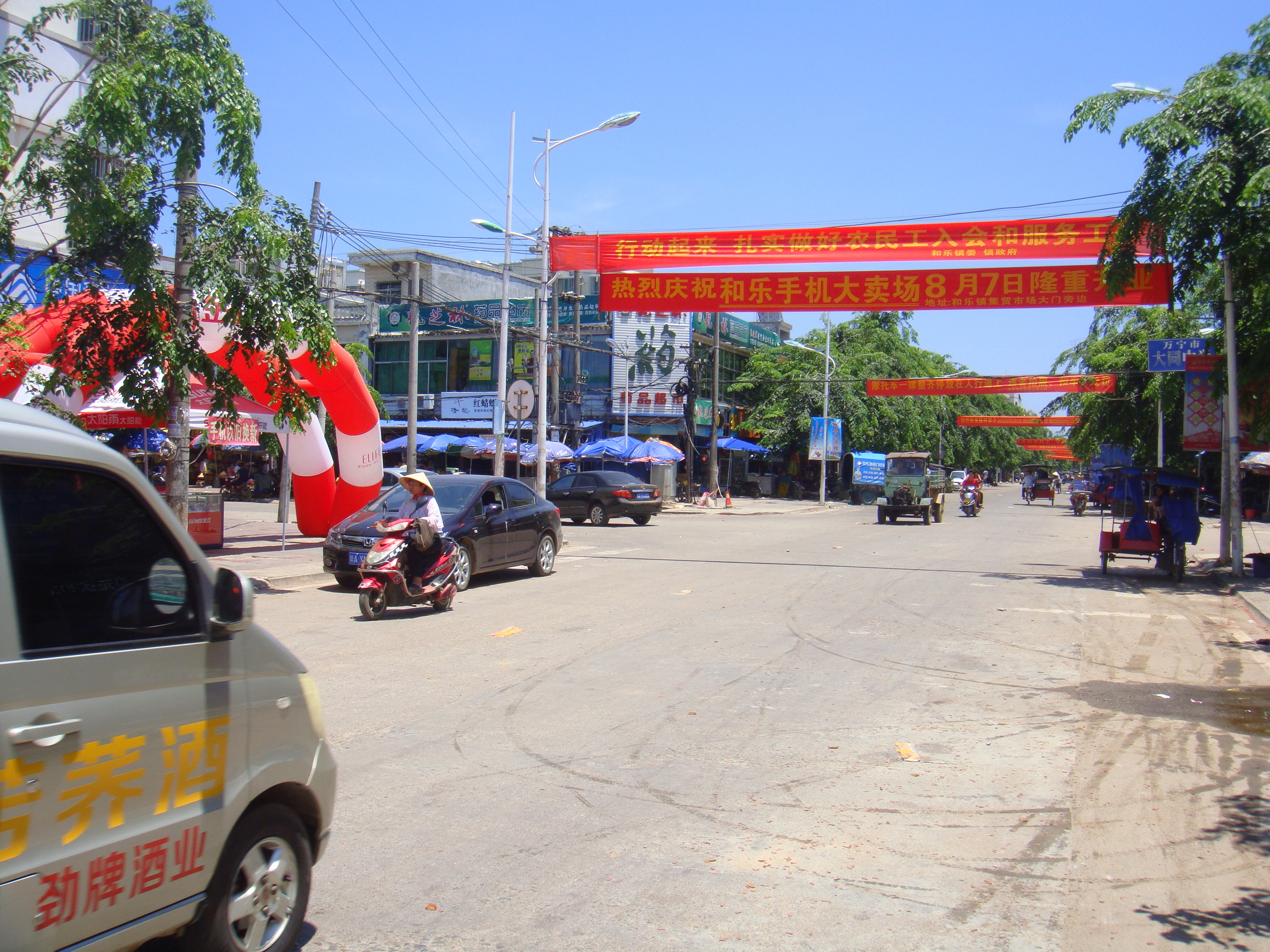
- Downtown Hele in 2015
- Interactive map of Hele, Wanning
- Country: China
- Province: Hainan
- Prefecture: Not Applicable
- Time zone: UTC+8 (China Standard Time)

Hele (Chinese: 和乐) is a township-level division in the county-level city of Wanning in southeast Hainan, China.

== See also ==
- List of township-level divisions of Hainan
- Hainan cuisine#Hele crab, a local crab dish
