= Tuncheng =

- Town

Chinese transcription(s)
  - Chinese: 屯城镇
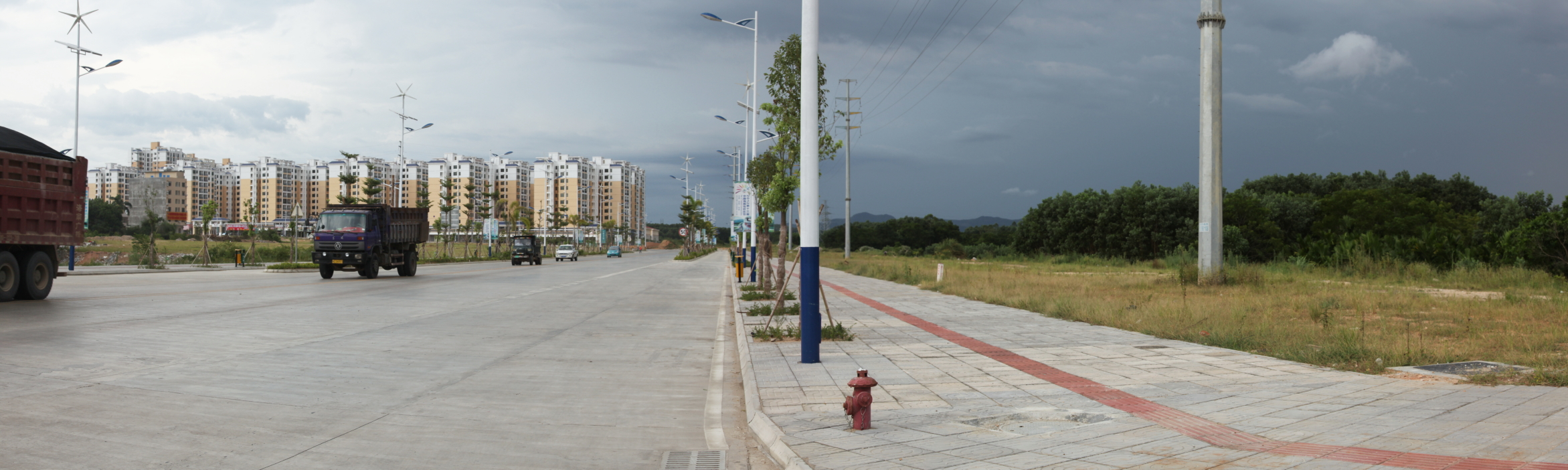

- Location in Hainan Tuncheng (China)
- Coordinates: 19°21′48″N 110°5′52″E
- Country: China
- Province: Hainan
- County: Tunchang County
- Time zone: UTC+8 (China Standard Time)

Tuncheng (Chinese: 屯城) is a town and the administrative seat of Tunchang County in Hainan, China. It lies along the G224 highway, about 80 kilometres from Haikou. The town is characterized by a number of botanical gardens with water features. There are also crystal mines in Tunchang. In 1992 the town had a population of 14,974 people living in 78 villages.

== Administrative divisions ==
The town contains the following communities and villages:

- Wen'an Community (文安社区)
- Xinjian Community (新建社区)
- Dongfeng Community (东风社区)
- Haizhong Community (海中社区)
- Xinnan Community (新南社区)
- Wenzhong Community (文中社区)
- Wenxin Community (文新社区)
- Chengbei Community (城北社区)
- Tunchang Village (屯昌村)
- Tunxin Village (屯新村)
- Yuezhai Village (岳寨村)
- Liangshi Village (良史村)
- Guangming Village (光明村)
- Shuikou Village (水口村)
- Wendan Village (文旦村)
- Jiabao Village (加宝村)
- Dadong Village (大东村)
- Dachangpo Village (大长坡村)
- Dashi Village (大石村)
- Pingpo Village (平坡村)
- Sanfa Village (三发村)
- Xinchang Village (新昌村)
- Datong Village (大同村)
- Dadong Village (大洞村)
- Dalupo Village (大陆坡村)
- Longshui Village (龙水村)
- Haijun Village (海军村)
- Haixin Village (海新村)

== See also ==
- List of township-level divisions of Hainan
