= Changliu =

Changliu 长流
- Town

Chinese transcription(s)
- Location in Hainan
- Coordinates: 20°01′00″N 110°12′00″E
- Country: China
- Province: Hainan
- Prefecture-level city: Haikou
- District: Xiuying District
- Time zone: UTC+8 (China Standard Time)

Changliu (Chinese: 长流) is a town (a township-level division) in Xiuying District of Haikou City, Hainan, China.

Changliu is located in the far western suburbs of Haikou. The Hainan terminal of the Guangdong–Hainan Railway, and the adjacent Haikou Railway Station are administratively within Changliu (about 6 kilometres (3.7 mi) to the northwest from the actual town center).

== See also ==
- List of township-level divisions of Hainan
