= Tunchang County =

Tunchang 屯昌县
- County
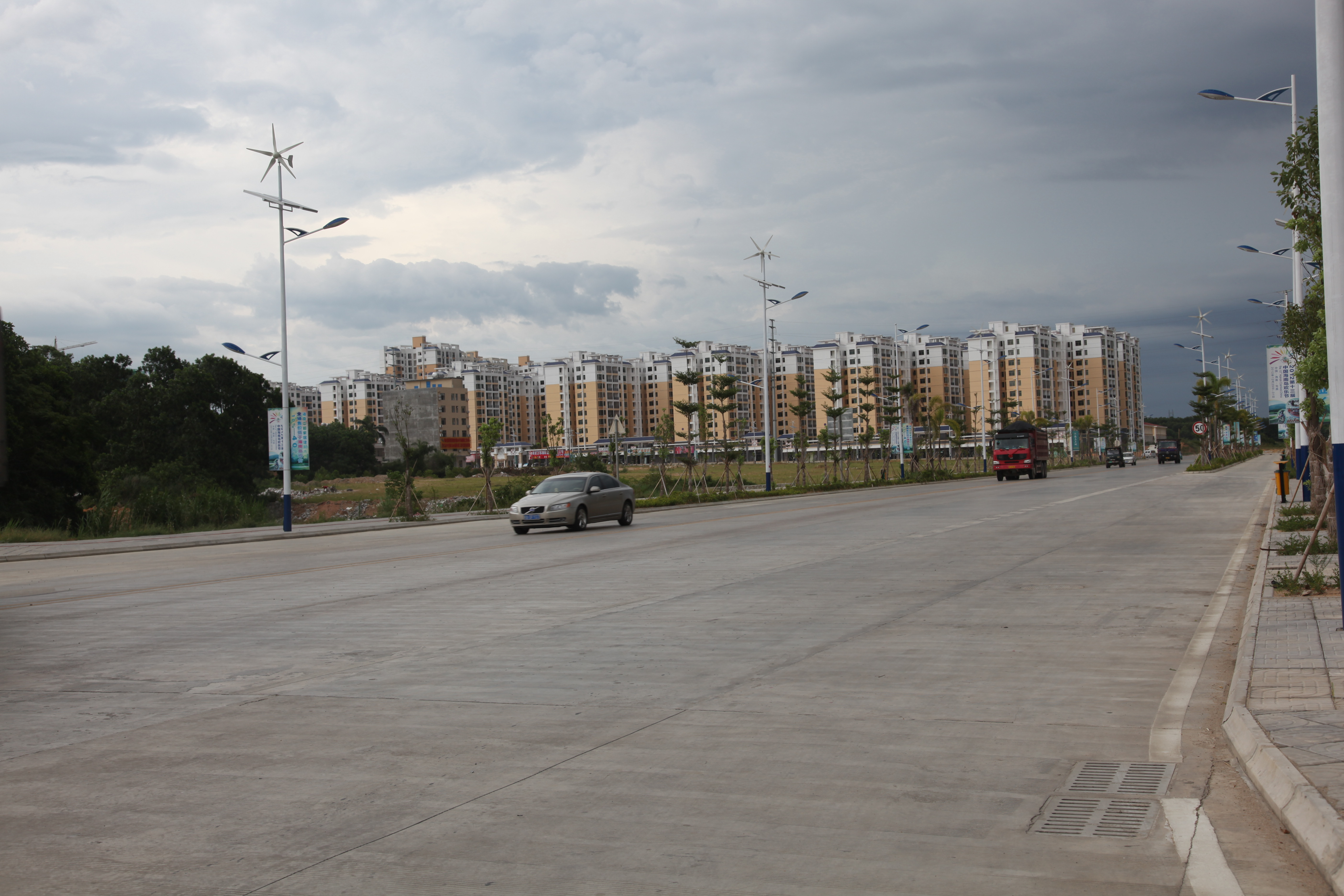
- Town of Tuncheng

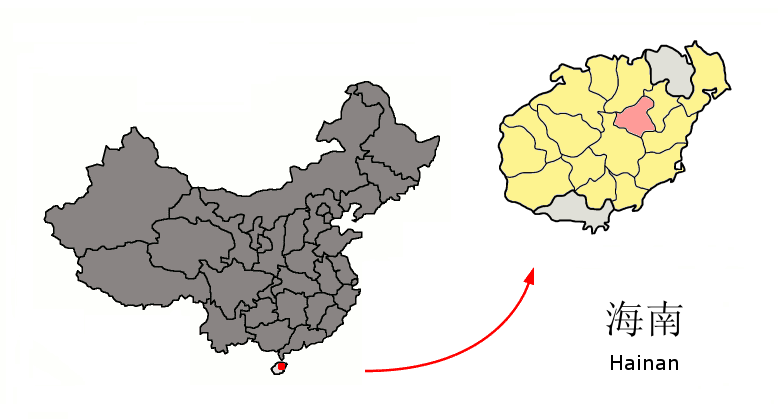
- Location in Hainan
- Coordinates: 19°21′58″N 110°9′54″E
- Country: People's Republic of China
- Province: Hainan

Area
  - Total: 1,240 km^{2} (480 sq mi)

Population (2022)
  - Total: 308,000
  - Density: 248/km^{2} (643/sq mi)
- Time zone: UTC+8 (China standard time)

Tunchang County is a county in the Hainan Province of People's Republic of China. Covering approximately 1,240 km^{2} (480 sq mi), it is centrally located within the Hainan province and bridges the province’s northern plains and central highlands. The administrative seat lies at Tuncheng. As of 2022, it had a population of about 308,000 inhabitants. The terrain is marked by low hills and fertile farmland. The economy is centered on agriculture and rural tourism.

== Geography ==
Tunchang is one of the six counties in the Hainan province of People's Republic of China. Covering approximately 1,240 km^{2} (480 sq mi), it is located in north-central Hainan and bridges the province’s northern plains and mountainous central highlands. The county possesses has the only mountainous terrain in the province, with almost 70 percent covered in forests. The province has large areca and rubber plantations. The province also has significant mineral deposits such as molybdenum ore. There are several sulfide rich hot springs near Wupo and Xinxing.

Tunchang has a tropical monsoon climate (Köppen Am).

Climate data for Tunchang, elevation 118 m (387 ft), (1991–2020 normals, extremes 1963–present)
Month	Jan	Feb	Mar	Apr	May	Jun	Jul	Aug	Sep	Oct	Nov	Dec	Year
Record high °C (°F)	33.5 (92.3)	36.3 (97.3)	36.8 (98.2)	40.4 (104.7)	39.1 (102.4)	39.7 (103.5)	39.5 (103.1)	37.2 (99.0)	36.8 (98.2)	35.3 (95.5)	34.1 (93.4)	32.0 (89.6)	40.4 (104.7)
Mean daily maximum °C (°F)	22.6 (72.7)	24.7 (76.5)	28.1 (82.6)	31.1 (88.0)	33.2 (91.8)	33.9 (93.0)	33.6 (92.5)	32.9 (91.2)	31.4 (88.5)	29.2 (84.6)	26.5 (79.7)	23.0 (73.4)	29.2 (84.5)
Daily mean °C (°F)	18.2 (64.8)	19.9 (67.8)	22.9 (73.2)	25.8 (78.4)	27.6 (81.7)	28.6 (83.5)	28.4 (83.1)	27.7 (81.9)	26.6 (79.9)	24.8 (76.6)	22.4 (72.3)	19.1 (66.4)	24.3 (75.8)
Mean daily minimum °C (°F)	15.4 (59.7)	16.9 (62.4)	19.6 (67.3)	22.4 (72.3)	24.2 (75.6)	25.3 (77.5)	25.1 (77.2)	24.6 (76.3)	23.9 (75.0)	22.1 (71.8)	19.8 (67.6)	16.6 (61.9)	21.3 (70.4)
Record low °C (°F)	3.4 (38.1)	5.4 (41.7)	5.9 (42.6)	14.0 (57.2)	15.5 (59.9)	20.0 (68.0)	21.3 (70.3)	19.5 (67.1)	18.3 (64.9)	12.7 (54.9)	9.3 (48.7)	3.8 (38.8)	3.4 (38.1)
Average precipitation mm (inches)	30.1 (1.19)	37.6 (1.48)	44.5 (1.75)	115.5 (4.55)	263.3 (10.37)	192.5 (7.58)	220.6 (8.69)	321.5 (12.66)	354.7 (13.96)	361.0 (14.21)	108.1 (4.26)	66.5 (2.62)	2,115.9 (83.32)
Average precipitation days (≥ 0.1 mm)	11.0	10.6	10.5	12.5	17.7	16.5	16.2	19.2	18.5	14.5	11.5	12.2	170.9
Average relative humidity (%)	86	84	81	80	80	78	79	83	85	84	84	84	82
Mean monthly sunshine hours	100.9	112.4	154.1	180.9	206.3	212.8	223.7	197.7	157.5	147.6	114.9	87.1	1,895.9
Percentage possible sunshine	29	35	41	48	51	54	55	50	43	41	34	26	42
Source: China Meteorological Administration all-time extreme lowall-time April highAll-time June highall-time October record

== Demographics and economy ==
The population in 2022 was approximately 308,038, slightly down from 308,460 in 2021. The demographics reflect rural-to-urban migration, with population peaking at 313,500 in 2013, then varying through the decade. There are about six rural tourism sites in Tunchang and forms part of developing local tourism. Eco-cultural tourism which links nature, ethnic heritage, and rural experiences, is on the rise.

== See also ==
- List of administrative divisions of Hainan
