= Xiuying, Haikou =

Xiuying 秀英区
- District
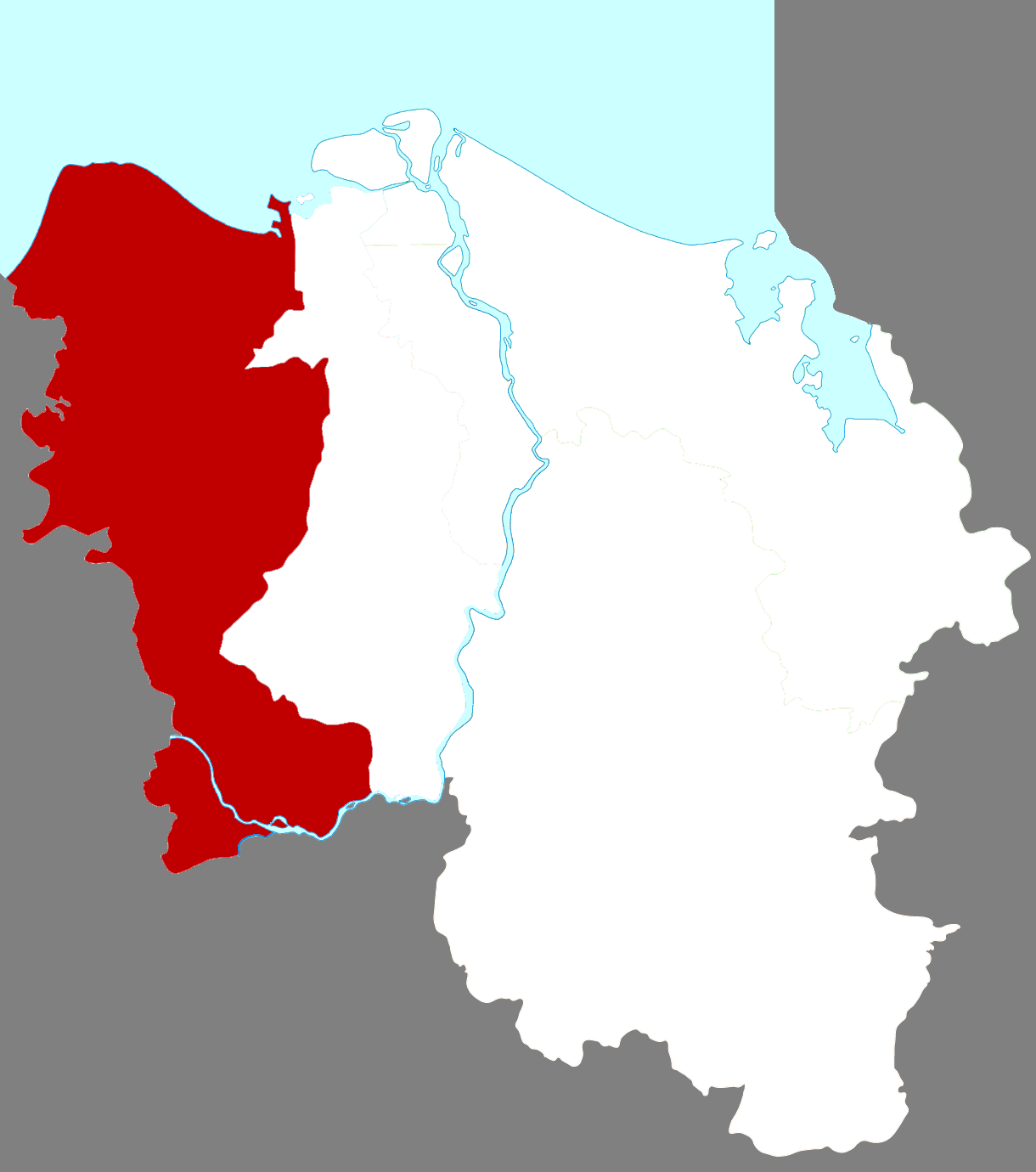
- Location of Xiuying in Haikou

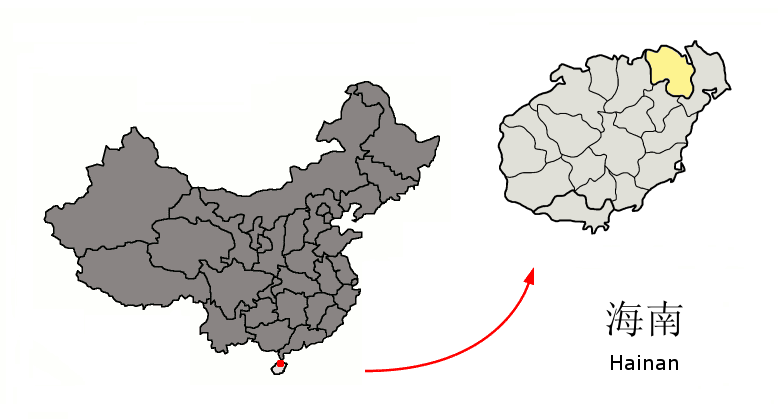
- Haikou in Hainan
- Coordinates: 20°00′29″N 110°17′37″E
- Country: People's Republic of China
- Province: Hainan
- Prefecture-level city: Haikou
- Established: 512

Area
  - District: 493.64 km^{2} (190.60 sq mi)

Population (2025)
  - District: 603,600
  - Urban: 485,900
- Time zone: UTC+8 (China standard time)

Xiuying (Chinese: 秀英区; pinyin: Xiùyīng Qū) is a district in Haikou City, Hainan. The district's total area is 512 square kilometers, and its population was 603,600 people in 2025.

== Administrative regions ==
Xiuying district has jurisdiction over Xiuying Road and Haixiu Road. It also contains the towns of Changliu, Xixiu, Haixiu, Shishan, Yongxing, and Dongshan.
