= Jiazi, Haikou =

Jiazi 甲子镇
- Town
- Location in Hainan
- Coordinates: 19°36′17″N 110°29′45″E
- Country: People's Republic of China
- Province: Hainan
- Prefecture-level city: Haikou
- District: Qiongshan
- Village-level divisions: 14 villages
- Elevation: 57 m (187 ft)
- Time zone: UTC+8 (China Standard)
- Area code: 0898

Jiazi (Chinese: 甲子; pinyin: Jiǎzǐ) is a town in Qiongshan District of Haikou, Hainan, People's Republic of China, located more than 45 kilometres (28 mi) southeast of downtown Haikou.

== Overview ==
The town covers an area of 104.6 square kilometres (40.4 sq mi) and is located southeast of downtown Haikou bordering Dazhi (大坡镇) to the east, Ding'an County to the west and Penglai (蓬莱镇) to the south. As of 2011, Jiazi is responsible for the administration of 14 villages.

== History ==
The town received its name during the ninth year of the reign of the Qing Qianlong Emperor (1744), when a market began in the first year of the 60-year cycle, which is also called jiazi.

== See also ==
- List of township-level divisions of Hainan
