= Jiazi, Lufeng, Guangdong =

Coordinates: 22°52′55″N 116°03′24″E

Jiazi 甲子镇
- Subdistrict

Chinese transcription(s)
- Interactive map of Jiazi
- Country: China
- Province: Guangdong
- Prefecture: Shanwei
- County-level city: Lufeng
- Time zone: UTC+8 (China Standard Time)

Jiazi (Chinese: 甲子; pinyin: Jiǎzǐ) is a township-level division situated in Lufeng, Shanwei, Guangdong, China.

== See also ==
- List of township-level divisions of Guangdong
