= Yongxing, Gansu =

Yongxing 永兴镇
- Town
- Location within China Location within Gansu
- Country: China
- Province: Gansu
- Prefecture-level city: Longnan
- County: Li

Area
  - Total: 82.88 km^{2} (32.00 sq mi)

Population
  - Total: 24,000
- Postal code: 746000
- Area code: 0939
- Geocode: 621226105

Yongxing is a town of Li County, Gansu, China. The population is 24,000. It is located about 25 km away from the county seat. The town's government seat is Yongxing village. The town was established in 1952.
