= Zhongyuan, Hainan =

Zhongyuan 中原镇
- Town

Chinese transcription(s)
  - Pinyin: Zhōngyuán
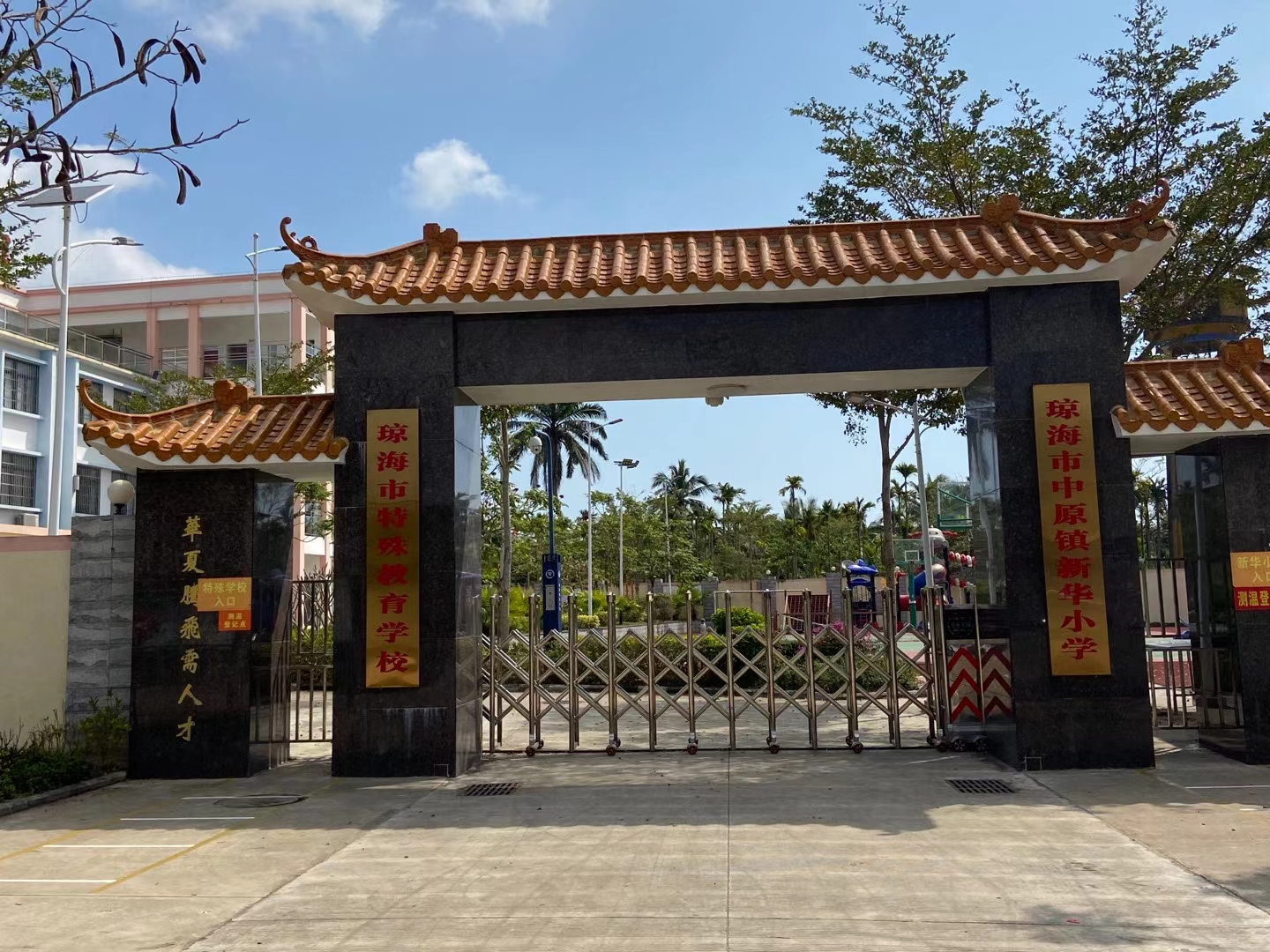
- Qionghai special education school

- Location of Zhongyuan in Hainan
- Coordinates: 19.1476°N 110.4695°E
- Country: China
- Province: Hainan
- County: Qionghai

Area
  - Total: 104.00 km^{2} (40.15 sq mi)

Population (2018)
  - Total: 31,323
  - Density: 301.18/km^{2} (780.06/sq mi)
- Time zone: UTC+8 (China Standard Time)

Zhongyuan is a town in the city of Qionghai, Hainan, China. The town spans an area of 104 square kilometres (40 mi^{2}), and has a hukou population of 31,323 as of 2018.

== History ==
Zhongyuan was established as a town in 1986.

== Administrative divisions ==
Zhongyuan administers 22 administrative villages.

== Demographics ==
As of 2018, Zhongyuan has a hukou population of 31,323. Zhongyuan had a population of 29,889 people as of 2002.

== Transportation ==
National Highway 223 runs through Zhongyuan, as does the Hainan East Line Expressway.

== See also ==
- List of township-level divisions of Hainan
