= Hedong District, Sanya =

Hedong District 河东区
- Township-level district
- Location in Hainan
- Coordinates: 18°15′12″N 109°30′40″E
- Country: People's Republic of China
- Province: Hainan
- Prefecture-level city: Sanya
- Village-level divisions: 12 residential communities 2 villages
- Elevation: 6 m (20 ft)
- Time zone: UTC+8 (China Standard)
- Postal code: 572002
- Area code: 0898

Jiyang District, Sanya City, Hainan Province, China

Hedong District (simplified Chinese: 河东区; traditional Chinese: 河東區; pinyin: Hédōng Qū; lit. 'river east') is a township-level district (akin to a subdistrict) of Sanya, Hainan, People's Republic of China. As of 2011, it has 12 residential communities (社区) and two villages under its administration.

== See also ==
- List of township-level divisions of Hainan
