= Yacha, Hainan =

Yacha 牙叉镇
- Town
- Location in Hainan
- Coordinates: 19°13′31″N 109°27′4″E
- Country: People's Republic of China
- Province: Hainan
- Autonomous county: Baisha Li Autonomous County
- Time zone: UTC+8 (China Standard)

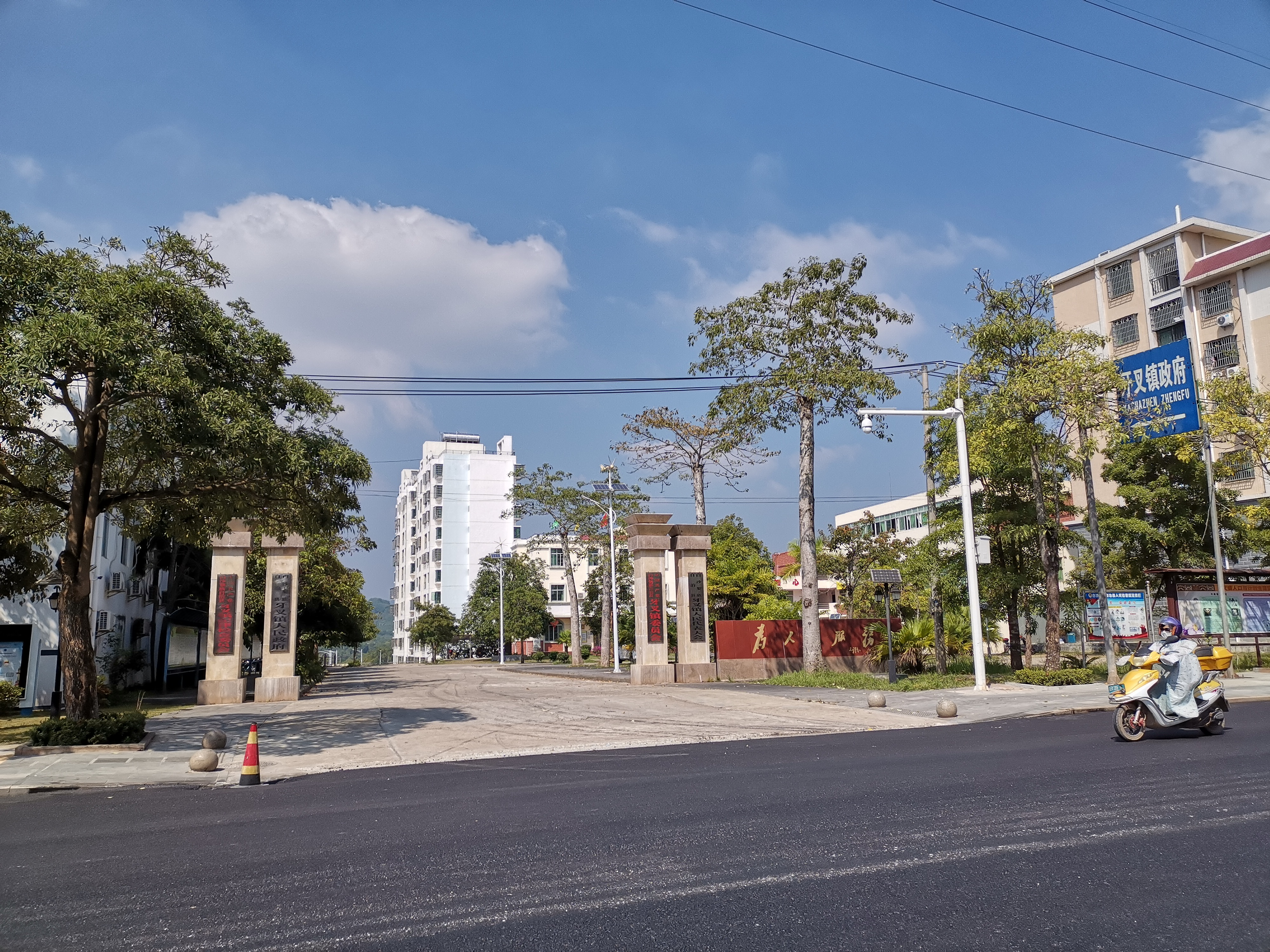
Yacha Town

Yacha (Chinese: 牙叉) is a town of Baisha Li Autonomous County, Hainan, China. As of 2018, it has 5 residential communities and 13 villages under its administration.
