= Lingshan, Hainan =

Lingshan 灵山
- Town
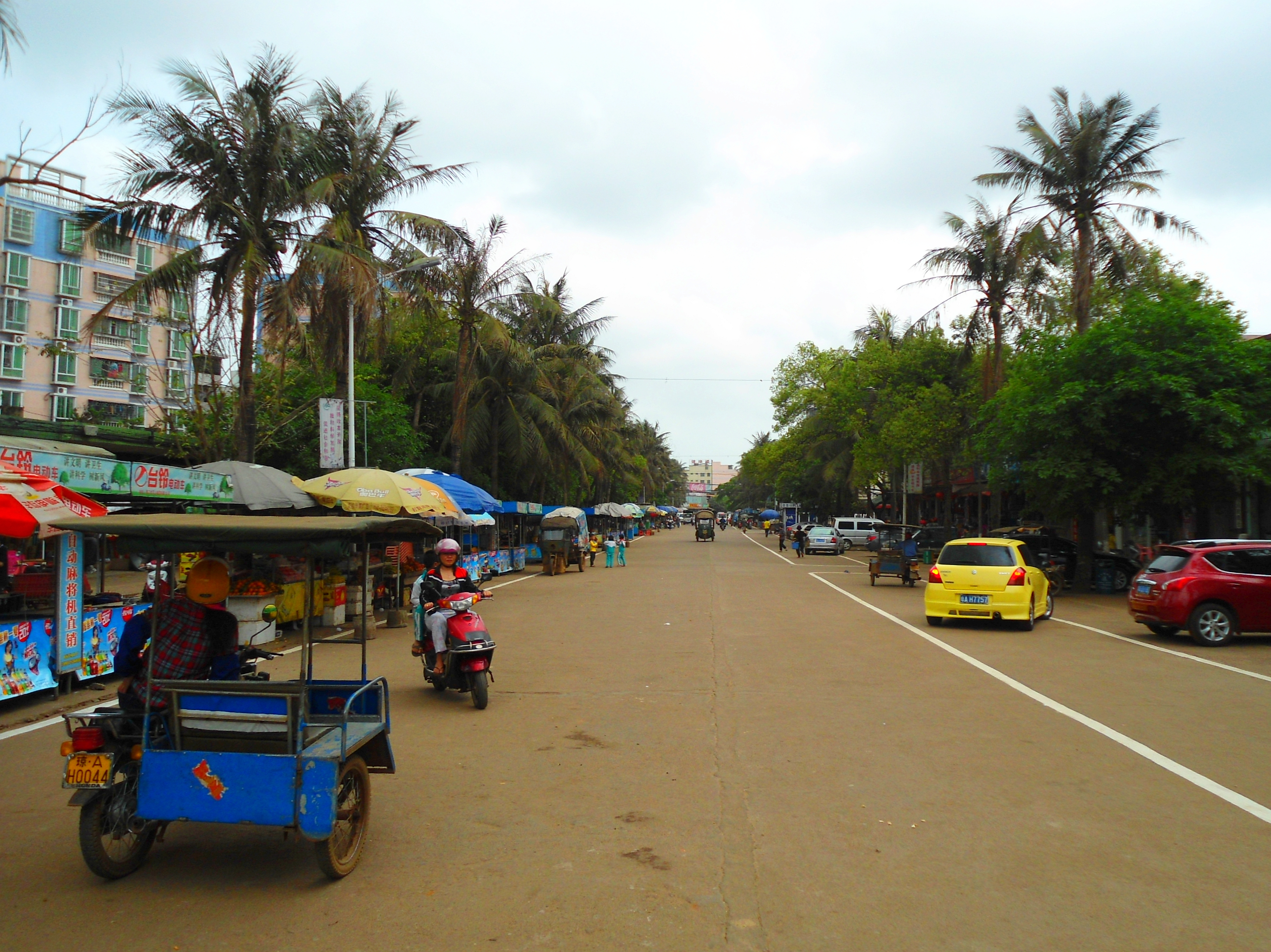
- Downtown
- Interactive map of Lingshan
- Coordinates: 19.967°N 110.429°E
- Country: China
- Province: Hainan
- Prefecture: Haikou
- District: Meilan
- Time zone: UTC+8 (China standard time)

Lingshan (Chinese: 灵山) is a town in Meilan District, Haikou City, Hainan Province, China. It is situated between the Nandu River to the west, and Guilinyang Town to the east. It has an old, busy, tree-lined centre, with a market and numerous small shops. There is a large Buddhist nunnery on the outskirts, located on the road to Guilinyang Town.
