= Yingzhou, Hainan =

Town in Hainan, China

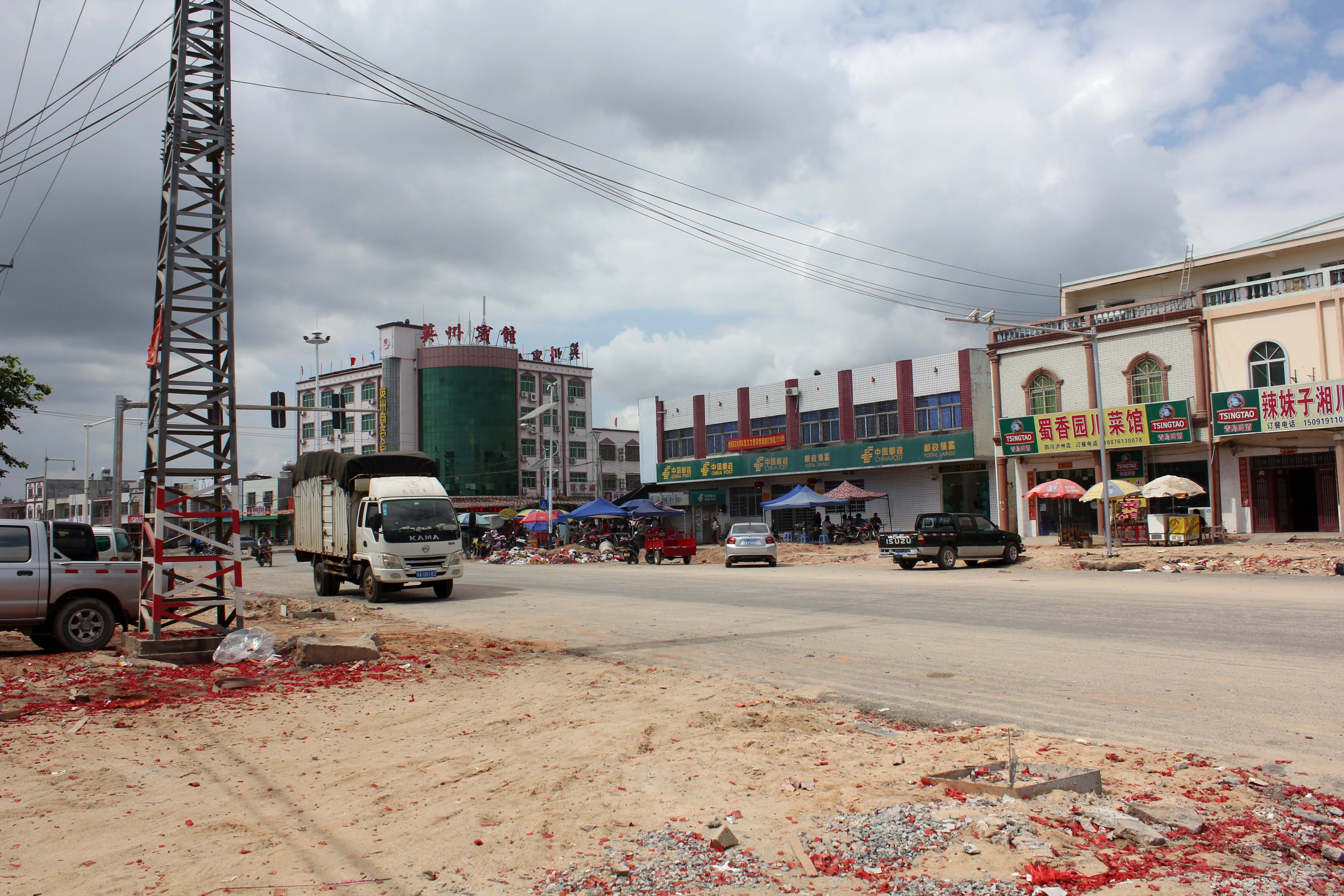
Yingzhou Town, Lingshui Li Autonomous County, Hainan Province.

Yingzhou (Chinese: 英州镇) is a town in Lingshui Li Autonomous County, Hainan, China. It is located in the southwest of the county. It is located 24 km northeast of the county seat, Yelin Town (椰林镇). It borders the towns of Longguang (隆广镇) and Xincun (新村镇) to the east and is adjacent to farmland south of Sanya (三亚市) to the west. To the north, Yingzhou is separated from Liugong Township (六弓乡) in Baoting Li and Miao Autonomous County by Mount Liaoci (廖次岭). The South China Sea lies to the south. Yingzhou has a total of 18.67 kilometers of coastline and a total area of 132.4 kilometers squared. As of 2011, its total population was 39,954, of which 72% were of the Hlai ethnic group. The Hainan Island Ring Expressway and China National Highway 223 run through Yingzhou.

== Administrative divisions ==
Yingzhou has the following administrative subdivisions:

- Yingzhou Village (英州村)
- Tiantang Village (天堂村)
- Dapo Village (大坡村)
- Ezi Village (鹅仔村)
- Gulou Village (古楼村)
- Wuhe Village (五合村)
- Juntian Village (军田村)
- Wan'an Village (万安村)
- Hongxie Village (红鞋村)
- Gangshan Village (岗山村)
- Xinpo Village (新坡村)
- Dashi Village (大石村)
- Tianzi Village (田仔村)
- Muba Village (母爸村)
- Liaoci Village (疗次村)
- Gaotu Village (高土村)
- Chiling Village (赤岭村)
