= Huangtong Township =

Huangtong Township 黄通乡
- Township
- Location in Jiangxi Huangtong Township (China)
- Coordinates: 27°54′29″N 116°53′14″E
- Country: People's Republic of China
- Province: Jiangxi
- Prefecture-level city: Fuzhou
- County: Jinxi County
- Time zone: UTC+8 (China Standard)

Huangtong Township (simplified Chinese: 黄通乡; traditional Chinese: 黃通鄉; pinyin: Huángtōng Xiāng) is a township under the administration of Jinxi County in Jiangxi, China. As of 2018, it has 6 villages under its administration.
