= Baisha Li Autonomous County =

Baisha County 白沙县 Paksa
- Autonomous County
- 白沙黎族自治县; Baisha Li Autonomous County
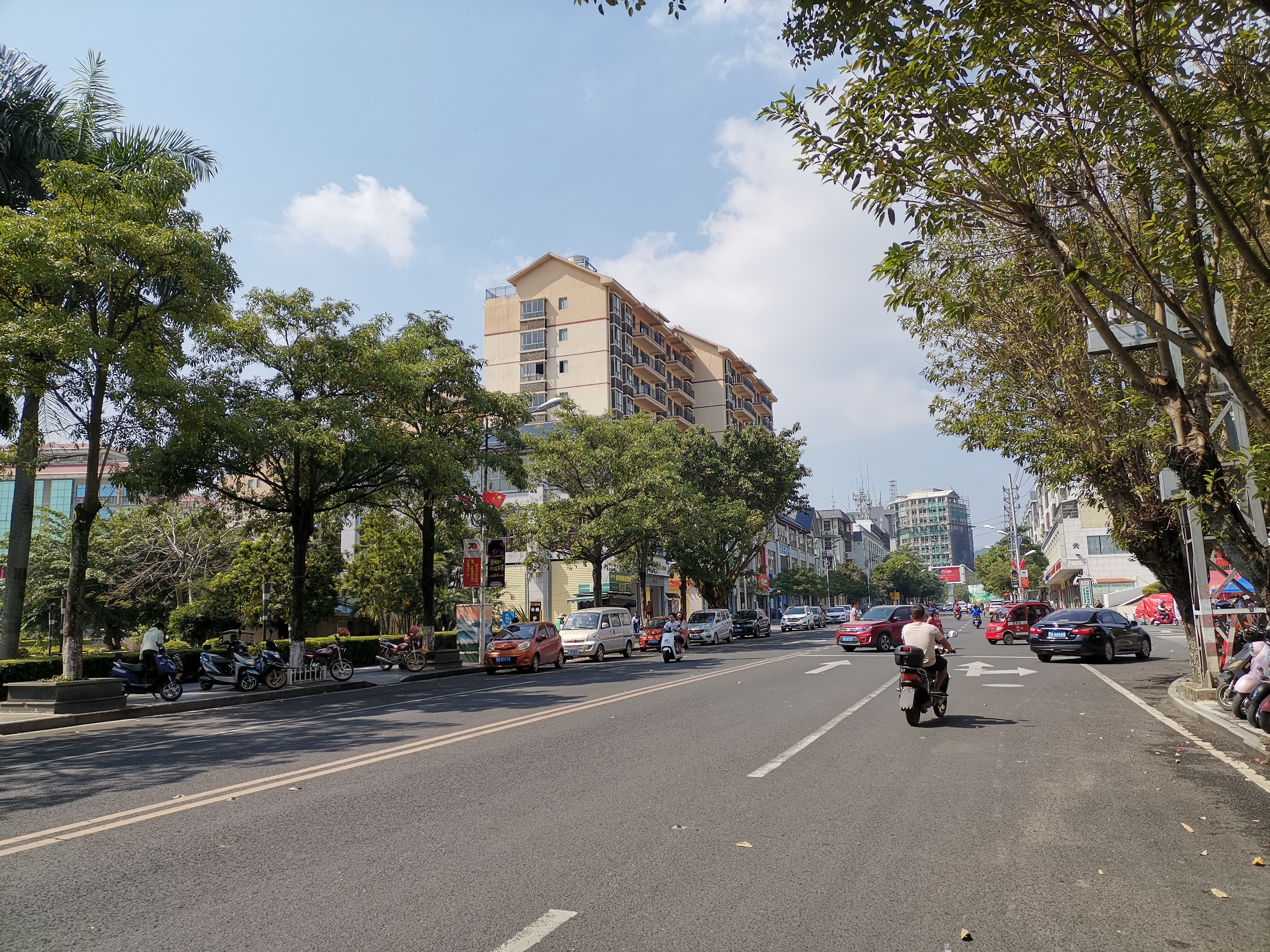

- Location in Hainan
- Coordinates: 19°13′37″N 109°27′47″E
- Country: People's Republic of China
- Province: Hainan
- County seat: Yacha

Area
  - Total: 2,177 km^{2} (841 sq mi)

Population (1999)
  - Total: 176,377
  - Density: 81.02/km^{2} (209.8/sq mi)
- Time zone: UTC+8 (China standard time)
- Postal code: 572800
- Website: baisha.hainan.gov.cn

Baisha Li Autonomous County (Chinese: s 白沙黎族自治县, p Báishā Lízú Zìzhìxiàn) is one of 6 autonomous counties of Hainan, China. In 1999, its population was 176,377 people, largely made up of the Li people.

Baisha County was established in 1935, alongside Baoting County and Ledong County. In 1958, this county was briefly merged into Dongfang County before reestablishment three years later. On 20 November 1987, the State Council ratified this county as an autonomous county for Li people, and on 30 December the official establishment ceremony was held.

== Administrative division ==
Baisha County is divided into:

- 4 Towns (镇): Yacha (牙叉镇), Qifang (七坊镇), Bangxi (邦溪镇), Da'an (打安镇).
- 7 Townships (乡): Xishui Township (细水乡), Yuanmen Township (元门乡), Nankai Township (南开乡), Fulong Township (阜龙乡), Qingsong Township (青松乡), Jinpo Township (金波乡), Rongbang Township (荣邦乡).
- 9 Township-level Farm Areas (农场)

== Demography ==
Ethnic composition of Baisha County (2020)
Ethnic group	Percentage
Hlai	60.1%
Han	36.7%
Zhuang	1.5%
Miao	1%
others	0.7%

The main spoken languages in this county are Hlai, Hainanese, and Mandarin.

== Geography ==
Baisha County are mostly mountainous forests which covered 83.47% of the county. The mountainous areas occupy around 73.1% of the county area, seconded by hilly areas with 19.1%, and the rest is plains with 7.7%. The highest mountain in the county is Yinggeling Mountain (1812 m above sea level), which also Hainan's second highest mountain after Wuzhi Mountain. The source of rivers like Nandu River, Changhua River, Zhubo River, and Shilu River, are found in this county.

== Climate ==
Baisha has a Subtropical Monsoon Climate (Köppen Cwa).It borders the Tropical Savannah climate (Köppen Aw).

Climate data for Baisha, elevation 216 m (709 ft), (1991–2020 normals, extremes 1963–2010)
Month	Jan	Feb	Mar	Apr	May	Jun	Jul	Aug	Sep	Oct	Nov	Dec	Year
Record high °C (°F)	34.2 (93.6)	37.4 (99.3)	38.1 (100.6)	39.0 (102.2)	37.8 (100.0)	36.6 (97.9)	37.2 (99.0)	36.5 (97.7)	34.0 (93.2)	34.4 (93.9)	34.4 (93.9)	32.3 (90.1)	39.0 (102.2)
Mean daily maximum °C (°F)	23.5 (74.3)	25.8 (78.4)	29.5 (85.1)	32.0 (89.6)	33.2 (91.8)	33.7 (92.7)	33.3 (91.9)	32.5 (90.5)	31.1 (88.0)	29.0 (84.2)	26.5 (79.7)	23.3 (73.9)	29.5 (85.0)
Daily mean °C (°F)	17.8 (64.0)	19.6 (67.3)	22.8 (73.0)	25.5 (77.9)	27.0 (80.6)	28.1 (82.6)	27.6 (81.7)	26.8 (80.2)	25.7 (78.3)	23.9 (75.0)	21.5 (70.7)	18.5 (65.3)	23.7 (74.7)
Mean daily minimum °C (°F)	14.3 (57.7)	15.6 (60.1)	18.5 (65.3)	21.4 (70.5)	23.3 (73.9)	24.4 (75.9)	24.0 (75.2)	23.5 (74.3)	22.7 (72.9)	20.8 (69.4)	18.4 (65.1)	15.5 (59.9)	20.2 (68.4)
Record low °C (°F)	−1.4 (29.5)	6.9 (44.4)	10.9 (51.6)	14.2 (57.6)	17.7 (63.9)	19.6 (67.3)	21.1 (70.0)	19.2 (66.6)	16.5 (61.7)	10.8 (51.4)	9.3 (48.7)	0.4 (32.7)	−1.4 (29.5)
Average precipitation mm (inches)	15.6 (0.61)	16.1 (0.63)	40.8 (1.61)	124.2 (4.89)	263.8 (10.39)	190.7 (7.51)	256.7 (10.11)	346.2 (13.63)	303.3 (11.94)	236.4 (9.31)	90.6 (3.57)	42.7 (1.68)	1,927.1 (75.88)
Average precipitation days (≥ 0.1 mm)	9.6	8.0	8.9	12.1	17.9	15.2	18.3	20.2	19.1	14.1	11.2	10.5	165.1
Average relative humidity (%)	84	81	78	78	80	78	80	84	86	85	85	85	82
Mean monthly sunshine hours	132.9	141.6	181.8	195.8	212.6	215.5	221.3	198.0	169.1	167.5	139.2	111.7	2,087
Percentage possible sunshine	39	44	49	52	53	54	55	50	46	47	42	33	47
Source: China Meteorological Administration all-time extreme temperature

== Transportation ==
=== Railway ===
- Hainan western ring railway: Furongtian railway station (芙蓉田火车站)

=== Highway ===
- China National Highway 225
- Hainan Provincial Expressway: S310 & S315

== Gallery ==
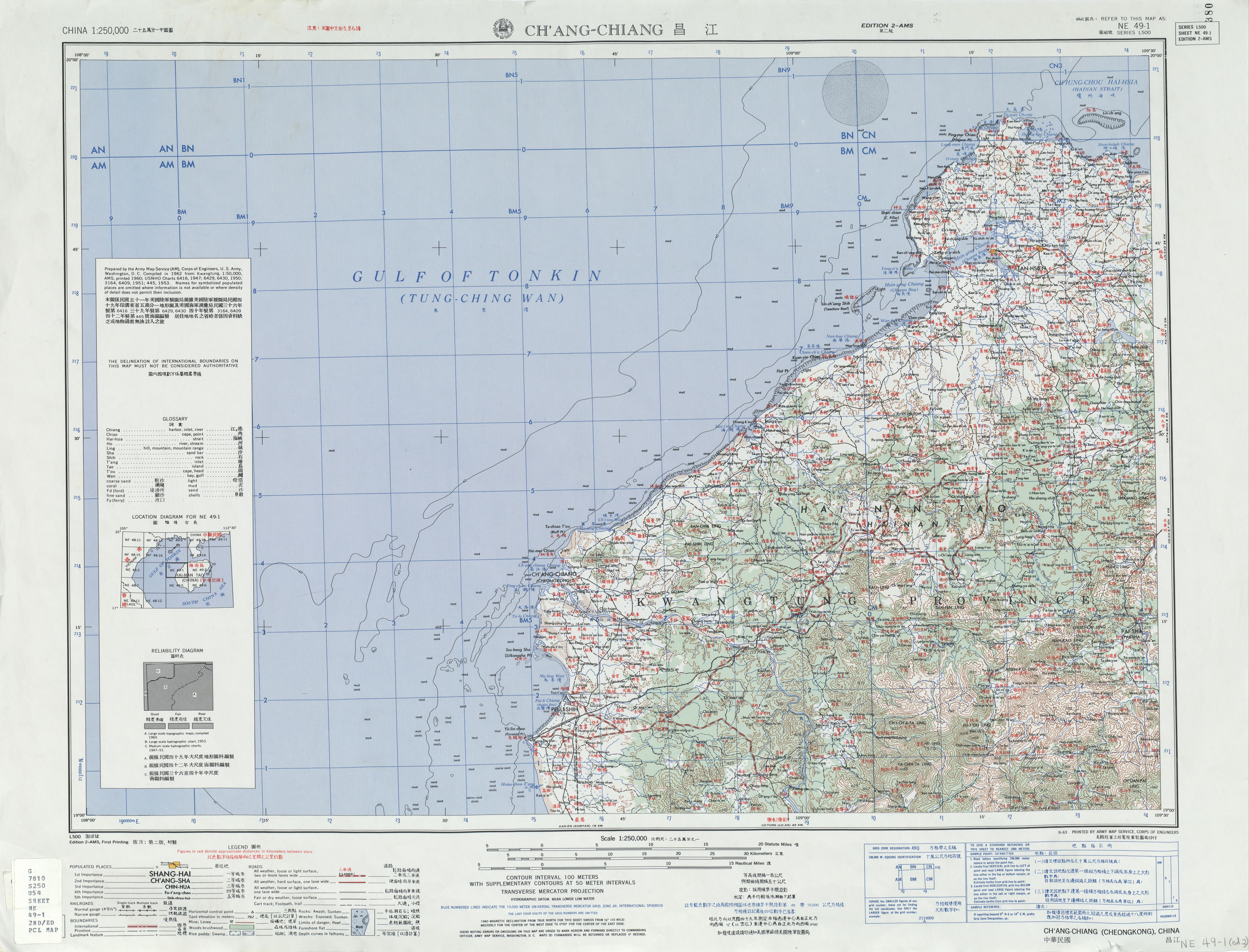
Map including Baisha (labelled as PAI-SHA (PAK-SHA)) (AMS, 1962)

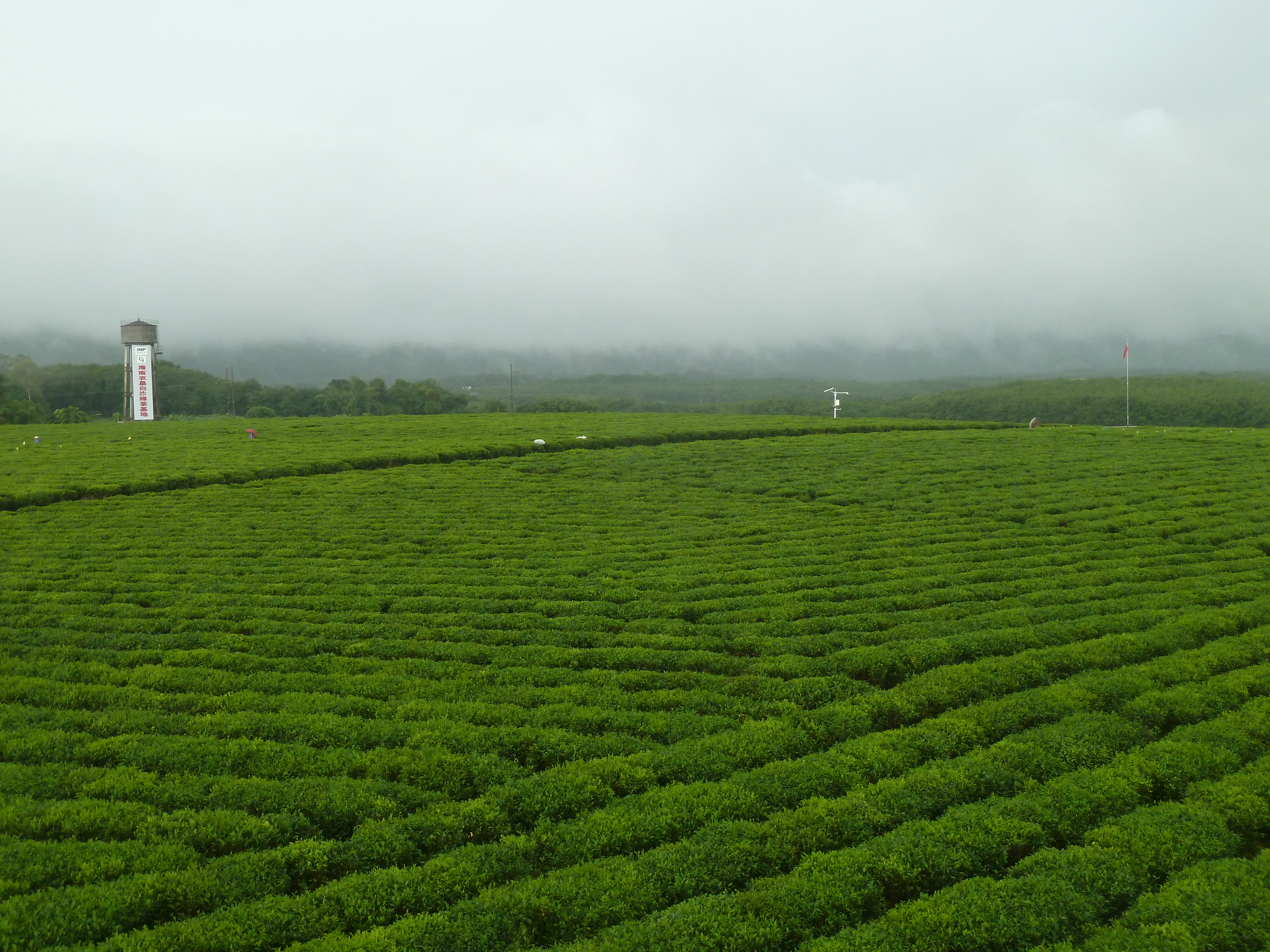
Baisha Natural Tea Garden Town

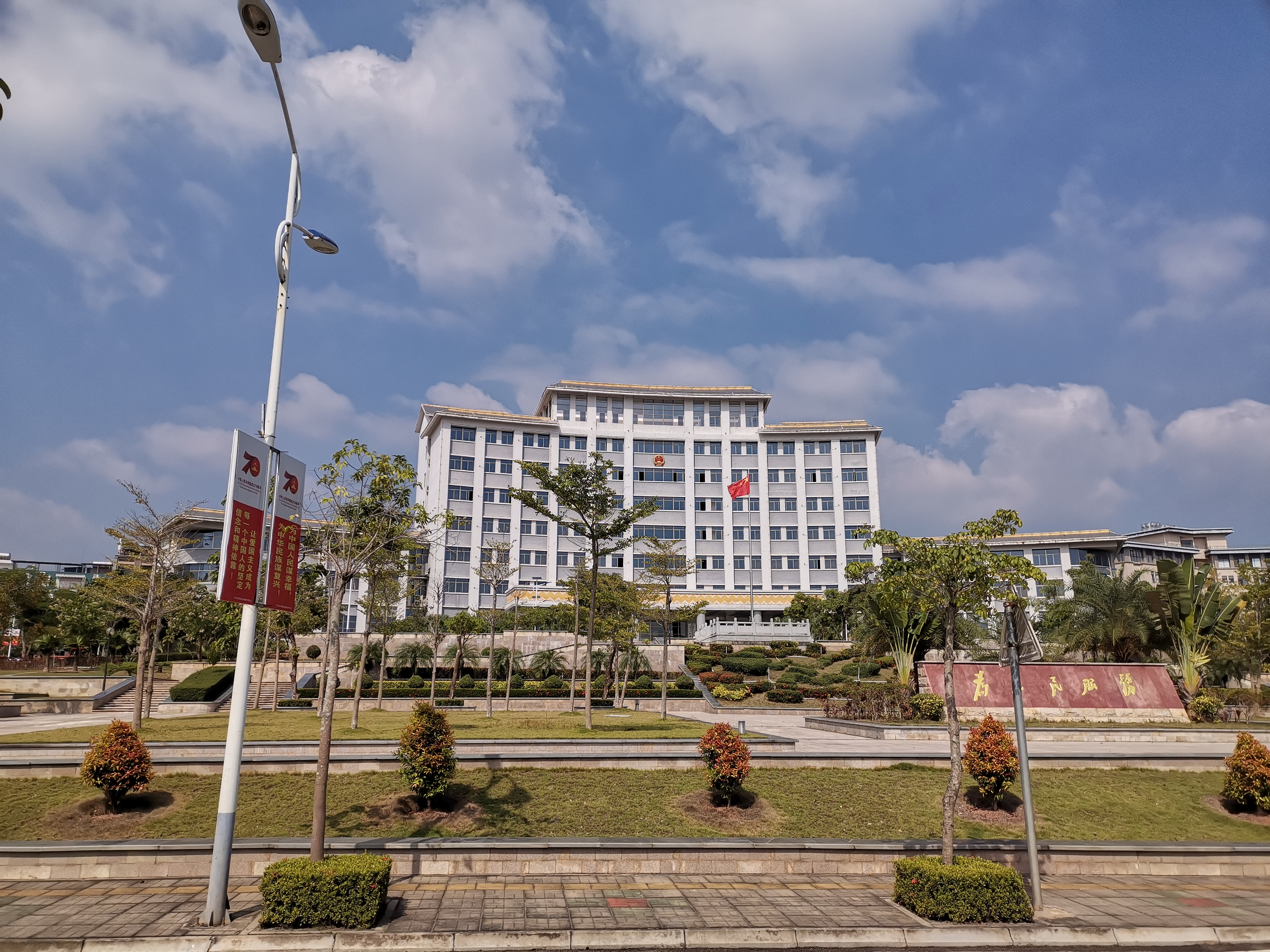
Baisha County Government Building

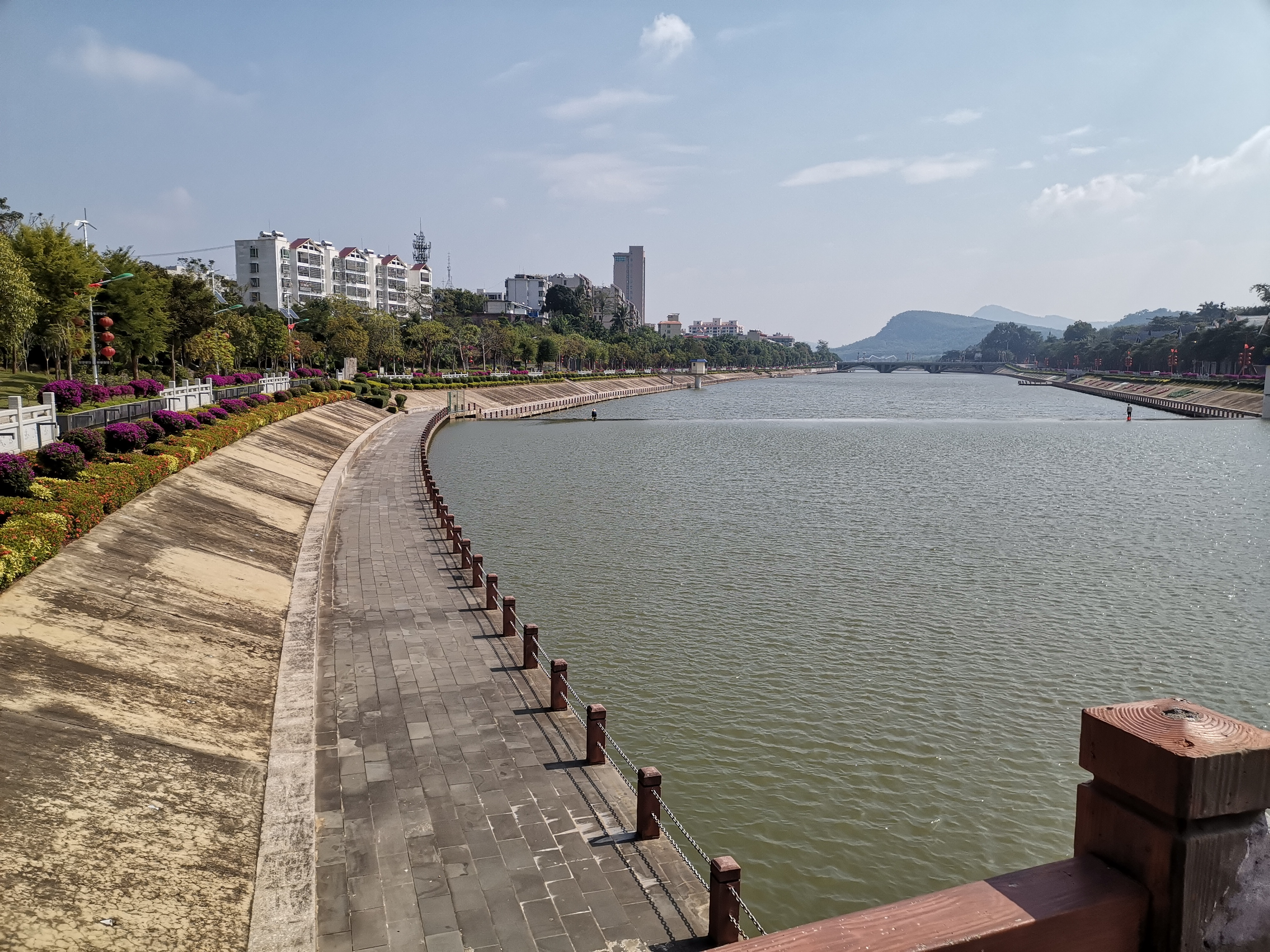
Nancha River (南叉江) that divides the Yacha town

== See also ==
- List of administrative divisions of Hainan
