= Huangtong, Hainan =

Huangtong 皇桐镇
- Town
- Location in Hainan
- Coordinates: 19°50′6″N 109°50′44″E
- Country: People's Republic of China
- Province: Hainan
- County: Lingao County
- Time zone: UTC+8 (China Standard)

Huangtong (Chinese: 皇桐; pinyin: Huángtóng) is a town in Lingao County, in Hainan province, China. As of 2018, it has 3 residential communities and 16 villages under its administration.
