= Meilan, Haikou =

Meilan 美兰区
- District
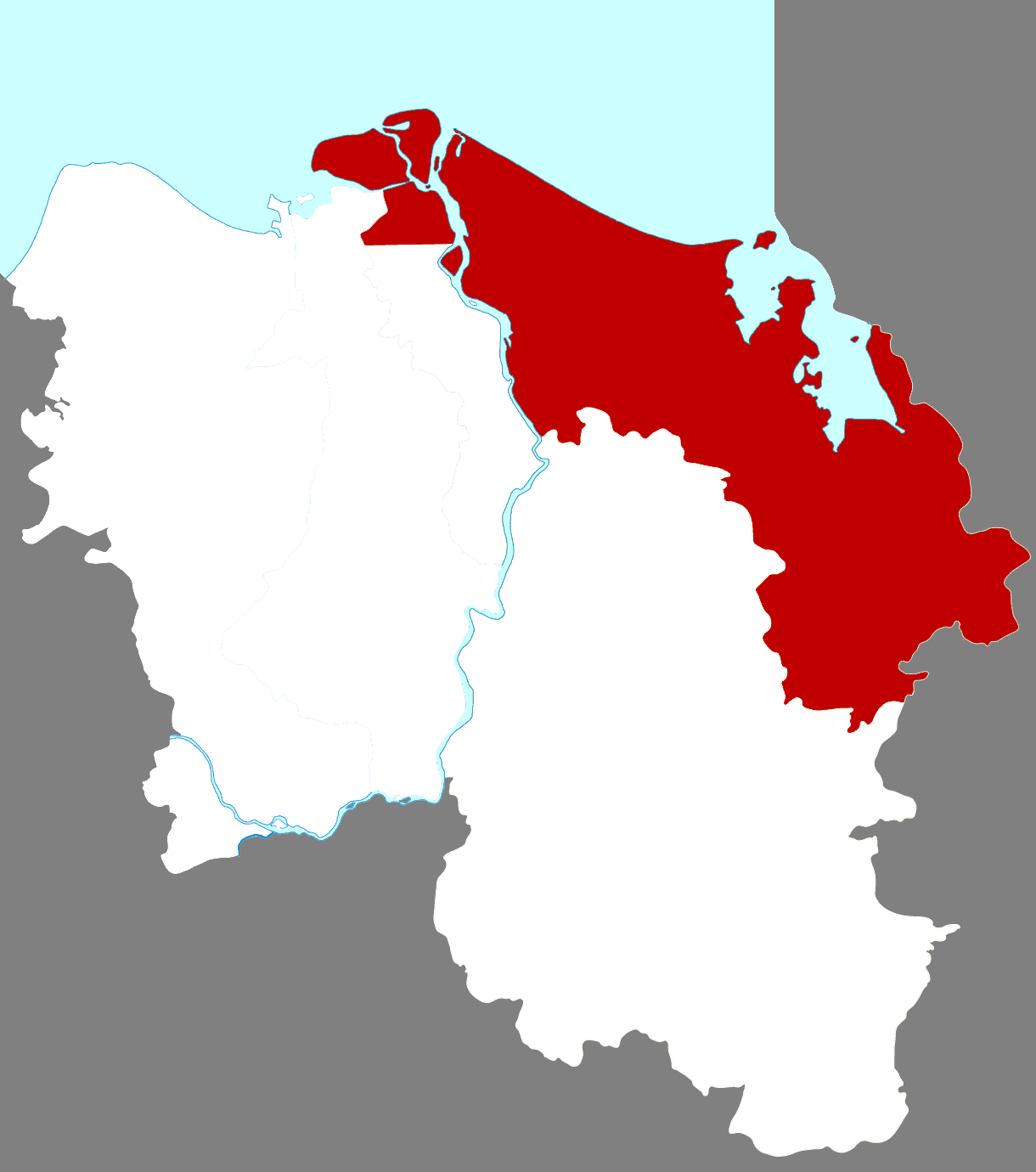
- Location of Meilan in Haikou

- Location in Hainan
- Coordinates: 19°59′56″N 110°24′11″E
- Country: People's Republic of China
- Province: Haikou

Area
  - Total: 581.06 km^{2} (224.35 sq mi)

Population (2010)
  - Total: 623,667
- Time zone: UTC+8 (China standard time)

Meilan (simplified Chinese: 美兰区; traditional Chinese: 美蘭區; pinyin: Měilán Qū) is a district in Haikou City, Hainan, China.

== Administrative regions ==
Meilan district has jurisdiction over places within Haikou city, such as Haifu Road, Bo'ai Road area, Haidian Road, Renminlu Road, Bailong Road, Hepingnan Road, and Baisha Road. It also contains the small towns of Xinbu Island, Meilan District, Lingshan, Yanfeng, Shanjiang, Dazhipo, as well as the villages on Beigang Island.

== See also ==
- Haikou Meilan International Airport
