= Qiongzhong Li and Miao Autonomous County =

Qiongzhong 琼中县
- Autonomous County
- 琼中黎族苗族自治县; Qiongzhong Li and Miao Autonomous County
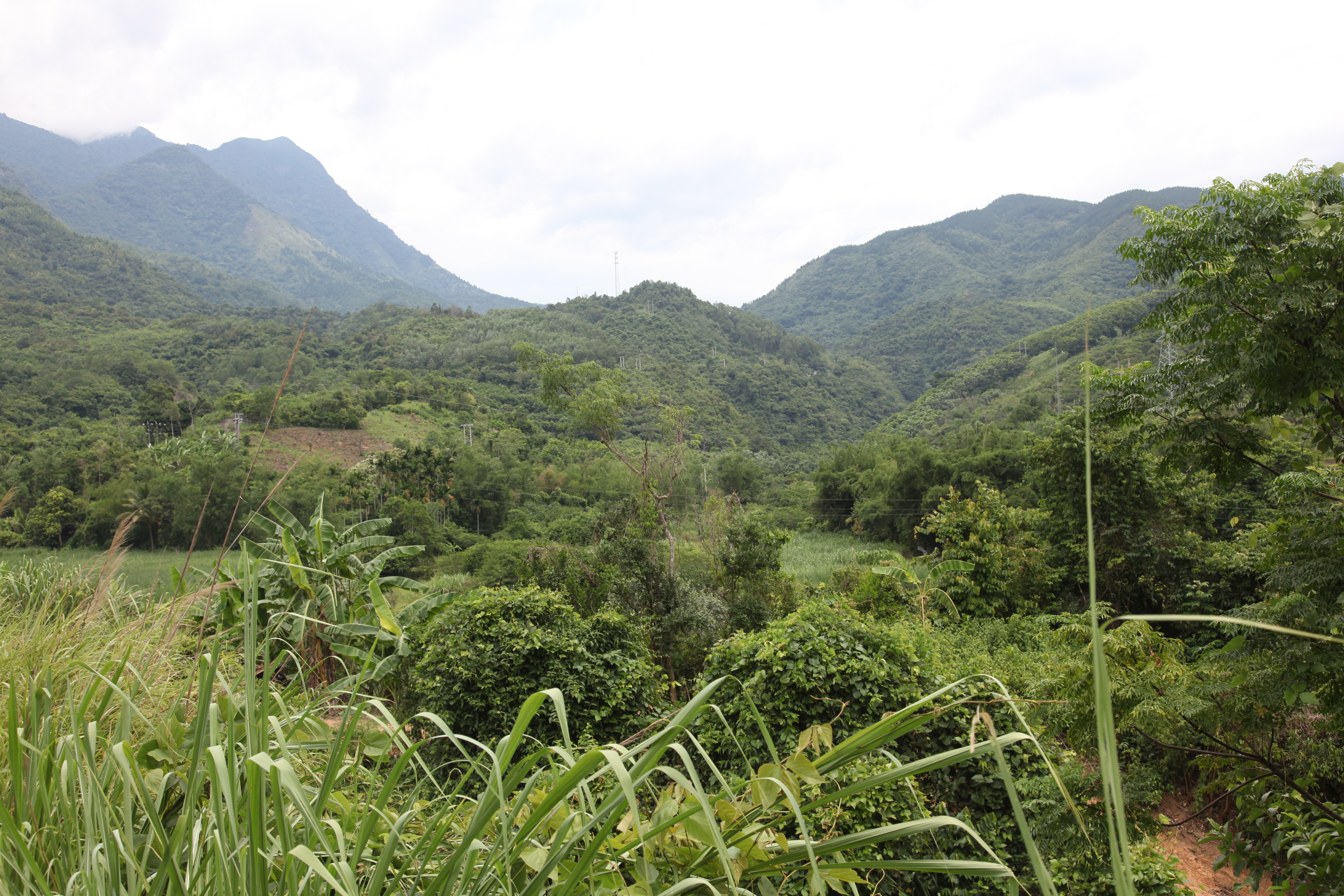

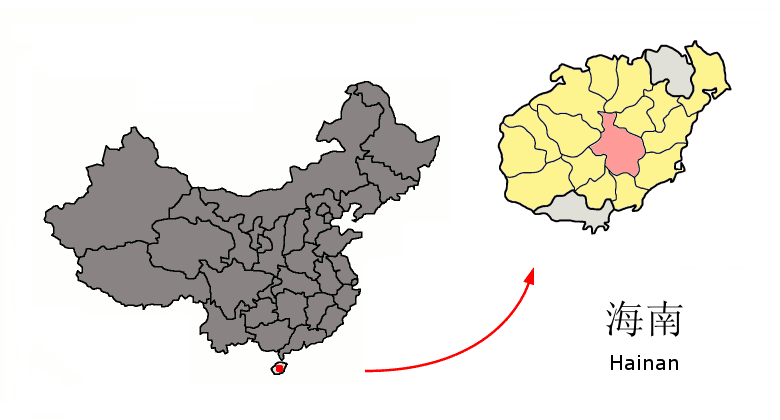
- Coordinates: 19°3′39″N 109°50′2″E
- Country: People's Republic of China
- Province: Hainan
- County seat: Yinggen

Area
  - Total: 2,936 km^{2} (1,134 sq mi)

Population (1999)
  - Total: 196,581
  - Density: 66.96/km^{2} (173.4/sq mi)
- Time zone: UTC+8 (China standard time)

Qiongzhong Li and Miao Autonomous County is an autonomous county in Hainan, China. It is one of 6 autonomous counties of the upper highlands of Hainan. Its postal code is 572900, and in 1999, its population was 196,581 people, largely made up of the Li people and the Miao people.

== Populated places ==
- Yinggen

== Climate ==
Qiongzhong has a subtropical monsoon climate (Köppen Cwa). It borders the tropical monsoon climate (Köppen Am).

Climate data for Qiongzhong, elevation 301 m (988 ft), (1991–2020 normals, extremes 1974–present)
Month	Jan	Feb	Mar	Apr	May	Jun	Jul	Aug	Sep	Oct	Nov	Dec	Year
Record high °C (°F)	32.4 (90.3)	36.0 (96.8)	36.1 (97.0)	38.0 (100.4)	38.2 (100.8)	37.0 (98.6)	38.2 (100.8)	36.4 (97.5)	35.9 (96.6)	34.7 (94.5)	32.7 (90.9)	31.4 (88.5)	38.2 (100.8)
Mean daily maximum °C (°F)	22.2 (72.0)	24.4 (75.9)	27.7 (81.9)	30.7 (87.3)	32.3 (90.1)	32.8 (91.0)	32.5 (90.5)	32.1 (89.8)	30.6 (87.1)	28.3 (82.9)	25.6 (78.1)	22.3 (72.1)	28.5 (83.2)
Daily mean °C (°F)	17.6 (63.7)	19.2 (66.6)	22.1 (71.8)	24.9 (76.8)	26.6 (79.9)	27.5 (81.5)	27.2 (81.0)	26.7 (80.1)	25.6 (78.1)	23.8 (74.8)	21.4 (70.5)	18.3 (64.9)	23.4 (74.1)
Mean daily minimum °C (°F)	14.4 (57.9)	15.7 (60.3)	18.1 (64.6)	20.8 (69.4)	22.7 (72.9)	23.7 (74.7)	23.5 (74.3)	23.3 (73.9)	22.6 (72.7)	20.9 (69.6)	18.5 (65.3)	15.6 (60.1)	20.0 (68.0)
Record low °C (°F)	0.1 (32.2)	4.6 (40.3)	4.3 (39.7)	13.3 (55.9)	14.3 (57.7)	17.4 (63.3)	19.4 (66.9)	19.1 (66.4)	16.8 (62.2)	10.1 (50.2)	7.8 (46.0)	1.5 (34.7)	0.1 (32.2)
Average precipitation mm (inches)	35.7 (1.41)	37.4 (1.47)	52.3 (2.06)	111.3 (4.38)	248.6 (9.79)	172.7 (6.80)	236.4 (9.31)	311.6 (12.27)	377.8 (14.87)	447.4 (17.61)	191.4 (7.54)	83.8 (3.30)	2,306.4 (90.81)
Average precipitation days (≥ 0.1 mm)	13.2	10.9	10.2	12.1	17.0	15.5	17.2	20.1	19.7	16.4	14.4	15.3	182
Average relative humidity (%)	87	85	82	81	81	80	81	84	86	86	87	88	84
Mean monthly sunshine hours	114.9	125.8	173.1	194.7	214.9	209.5	216.7	196.7	160.6	145.1	112.9	87.5	1,952.4
Percentage possible sunshine	33	39	46	52	53	53	54	50	44	40	34	26	44
Source: China Meteorological Administration all-time extreme lowall-time October record

== See also ==
- List of administrative divisions of Hainan
