= Wanquan =

Wanquan may refer to the following places in China:

- Wanquan River (万泉河), a river in Hainan
- Wanquan District (万全区), a county in Hebei
- Wanquan Subdistrict (万泉街道), a subdistrict in Dadong District, Shenyang, Liaoning

== Towns ==
- Wanquan, Gansu (万泉镇), in Zhuanglang County, Gansu
- Wanquan, Hainan (万泉镇), in Qionghai, Hainan
- Wanquan Town, Hebei, in Wanquan County, Hebei
- Wanquan, Hubei (万全镇), in Honghu, Jingzhou, Hubei
- Wanquan, Zhejiang (万全镇), in Pingyang County, Zhejiang

== Townships ==
- Wanquan Township, Fujian (万全乡), in Jiangle County, Fujian
- Wanquan Township, Shanxi (万泉乡), in Wanrong County, Shanxi

== Village ==
- Wanquan Village, Wanquan (万全村), in Wanquan, Honghu, Jingzhou, Hubei

== See also ==
- Wan'an Prefecture, a historical prefecture briefly known as Wanquan Commandery between 757 and 758
