= Studio on Fuxing Road =

Chinese film studio

Studio on Fuxing Road 复兴路上工作室
- Headquarters: Beijing, China
- Owner: Chinese Communist Party

Studio on Fuxing Road (Chinese: 复兴路上工作室), also known as Fuxing Road Studio, is a Chinese film studio that produces online videos focused on political, economic and diplomatic issues related to China and the Chinese Communist Party (CCP) leadership. Since its emergence in October 2013, the studio's short films have accumulated millions of views on Chinese video-streaming websites, and are regarded by many viewers as pro-government.

The studio has released about a dozen videos to date, covering topics ranging from General Secretary of the Chinese Communist Party Xi Jinping’s diplomatic travels, the CCP and its policies, and China’s economy. Its first video, titled “How Leaders are Made," appeared in October 2013 and uses computer animation to compare how China, the U.S. and the U.K. select their political leaders. It received more than a million views in less than three days.

Most of the studio's videos are released on Chinese video-streaming website Youku, though some have also been published on YouTube. China's government-run Xinhua News Agency published some of the videos on YouTube and Twitter.

Public information on the studio's background is sparse, though domestic and foreign media have speculated that it has ties to the Chinese government. The studio has no known website or address, while its members have declined to identify themselves in Chinese media interviews. According to media reports, the studio's name likely refers to Fuxing Road in Beijing, which can be translated as “Rejuvenation Road or “Renaissance Road,” and alludes to Xi Jinping's slogan calling for the rejuvenation of the Chinese nation. Many of China's propaganda agencies are located along Fuxing Road.

In a November 2015 interview with the People’s Daily, the newspaper of the Central Committee of the Chinese Communist Party, unnamed studio members said they are young professionals based on Fuxing Road, with backgrounds spanning broadcast media, international politics and philosophy, and interacted with foreigners in the course of their work.

In May 2016, The Wall Street Journal reported that Studio on Fuxing Road is part of the International Department of the Chinese Communist Party, which handles the CCP's foreign relations and public diplomacy, and is based on Fuxing Road in Beijing. The Wall Street Journal reported that the International Department's Information Bureau wields editorial control over the studio, which selects themes for its videos and hires external contractors to help produce them.

According to the Wall Street Journal, one of these contractors is China-i, a Beijing-based communications consultancy that produced two videos for Studio on Fuxing Road, which were themed on Xi Jinping's state visits to the U.S. and U.K. in September and October 2015 respectively. Yidu Media, a Chinese company, participated in the production of a Studio on Fuxing Road video on Xi Jinping's attendance at the 2015 Boao Forum for Asia in the southern Chinese province of Hainan, an Yidu executive told Chinese news outlet The Paper in an interview published in March 2015.
