= Shenzhou railway station =

Railway station in Wanning, China

Shenzhou 神州
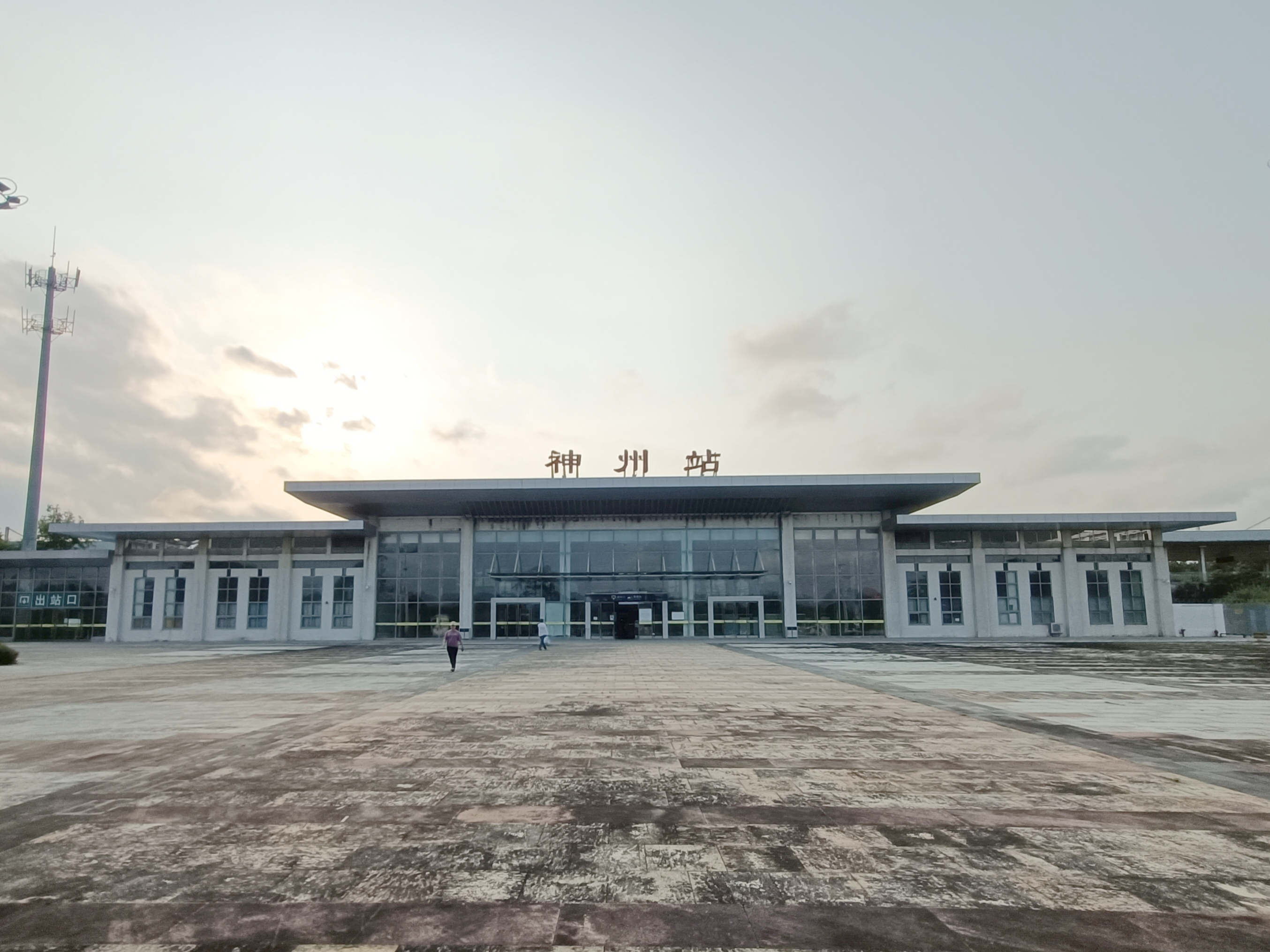

General information
- Coordinates: 18°45′14″N 110°19′25″E
- Line: Hainan eastern ring high-speed railway
Location

Shenzhou railway station is a railway station on the Hainan eastern ring high-speed railway, serving the county-level city of Wanning, located in Hainan, China.

China Railway High-speed train passing through Shenzhou railway station in Hainan

Preceding station	China Railway High-speed	Following station
Wanning towards Haikou	Hainan eastern ring high-speed railway	Lingshui towards Sanya
