= Bo'ao =

Bo'ao 博鳌镇 Boao
- Town
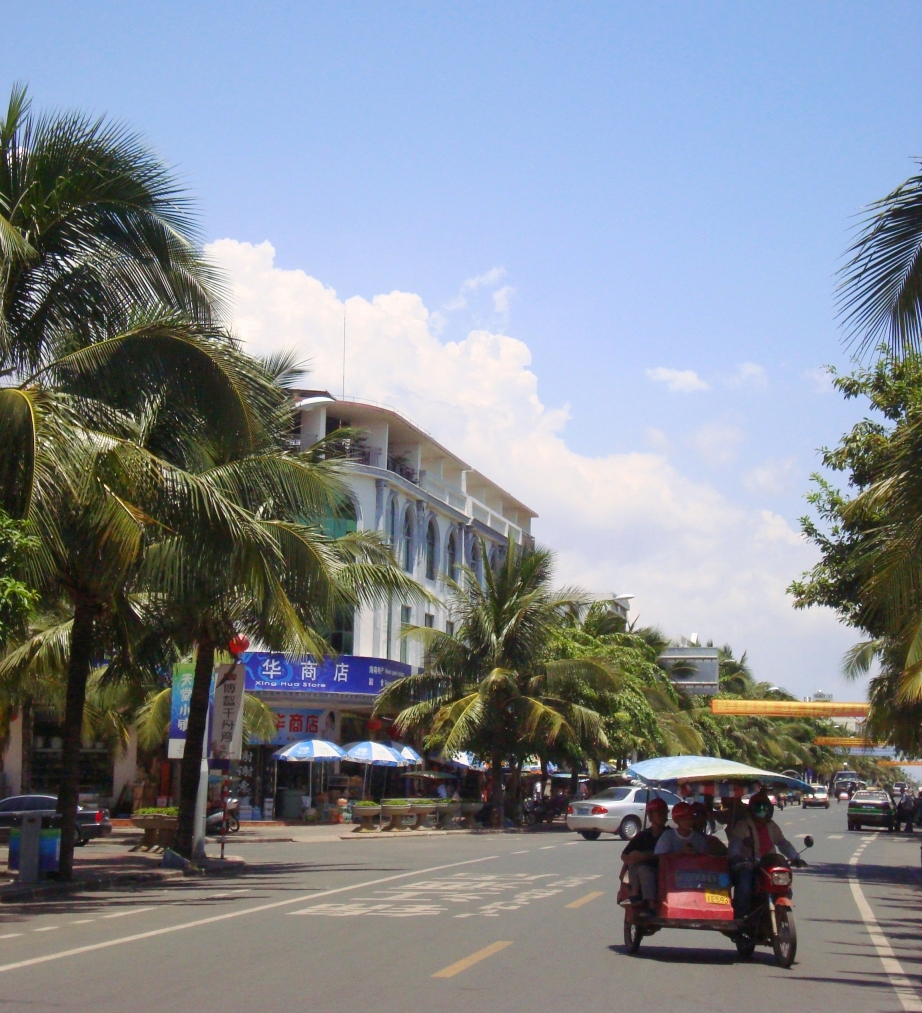
- Downtown Bo'ao

- Location in Hainan
- Coordinates: 19°09′38″N 110°34′51″E
- Country: People's Republic of China
- Province: Hainan
- County-level city: Qionghai

Area
  - Total: 12 sq mi (31 km^{2})

Population
  - Total: 10,000
  - Density: 840/sq mi (320/km^{2})
- Time zone: UTC+8 (China Standard)
- Postal code: 571434
- Area code: 0898

Bo'ao is a coastal town in the city of Qionghai, Hainan, China.

The town is near the mouth of the Wanquan River where it discharges into the South China Sea. The town is 17 km (11 mi) away from downtown Qionghai, 105 km (65 mi) away from Haikou and 180 km (110 mi) away from Sanya.

Bo'ao is famous for the Boao Forum for Asia, an international organisation whose venue is permanently located on Bo'ao's largest island, Dongyu Island (东屿岛).

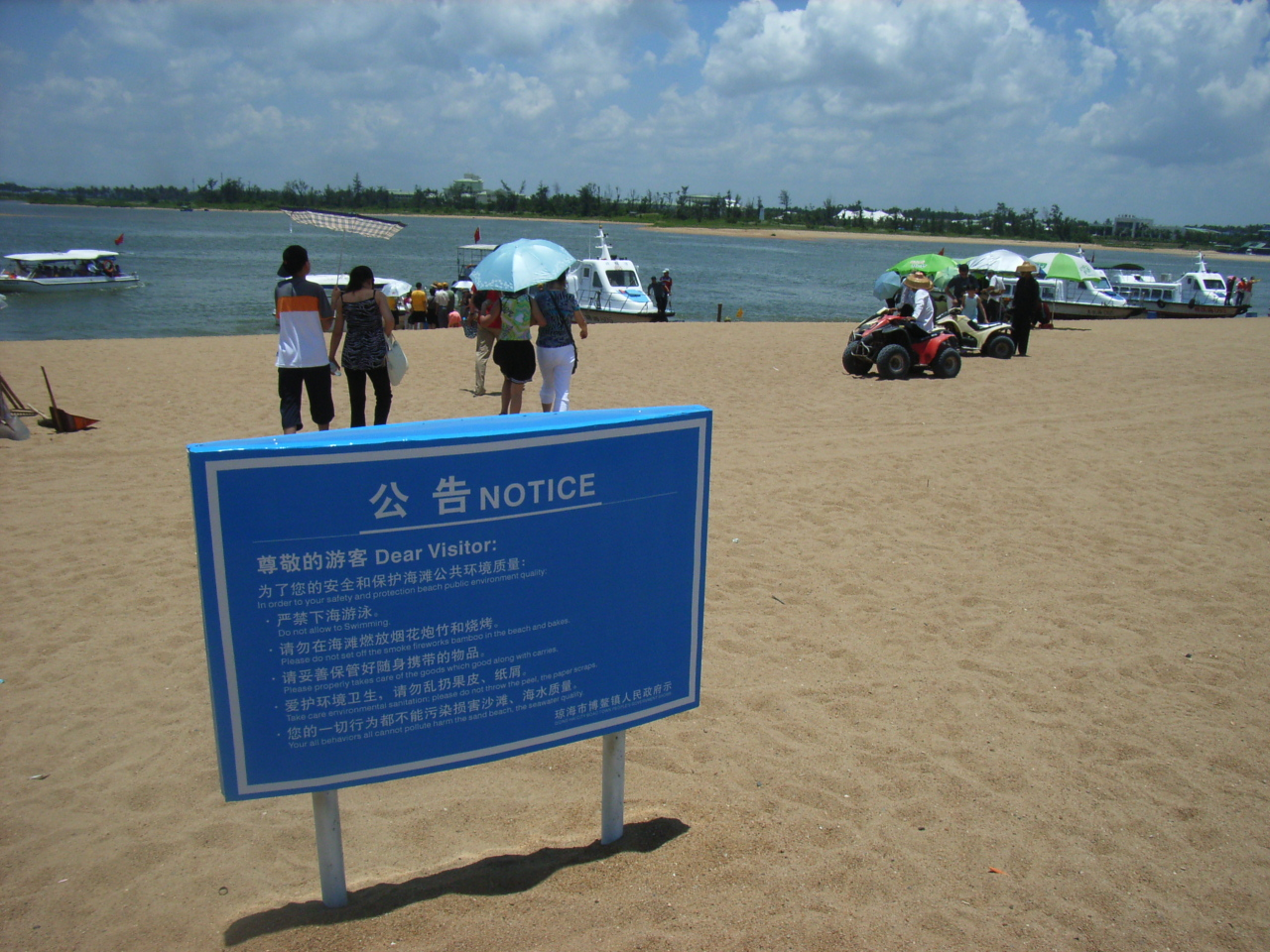
Jade Belt Beach (玉带滩)

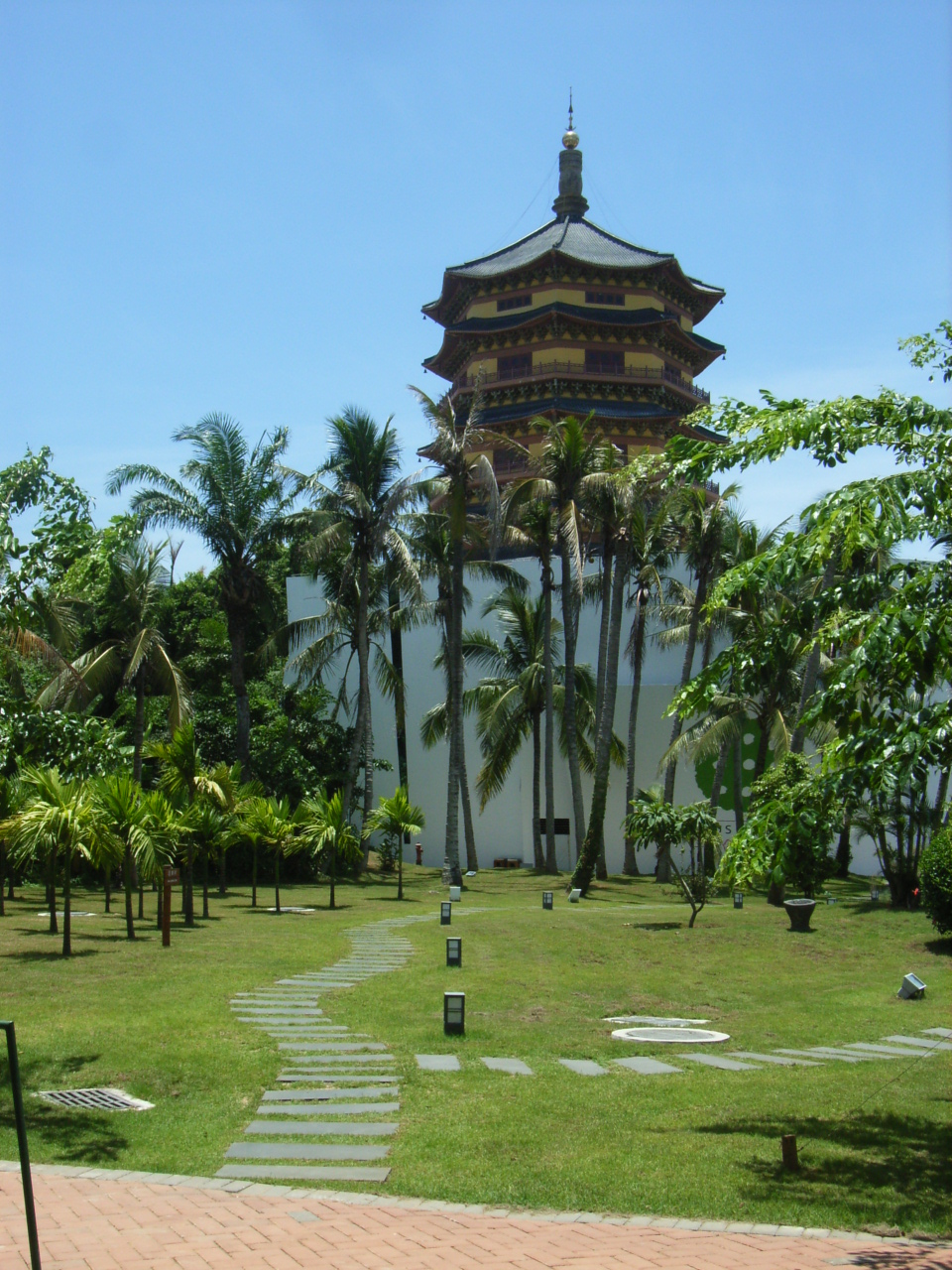
Bo'ao Buddhist Temple (博鳌禅寺)

== Transportation ==
Bo'ao railway station serves this town.

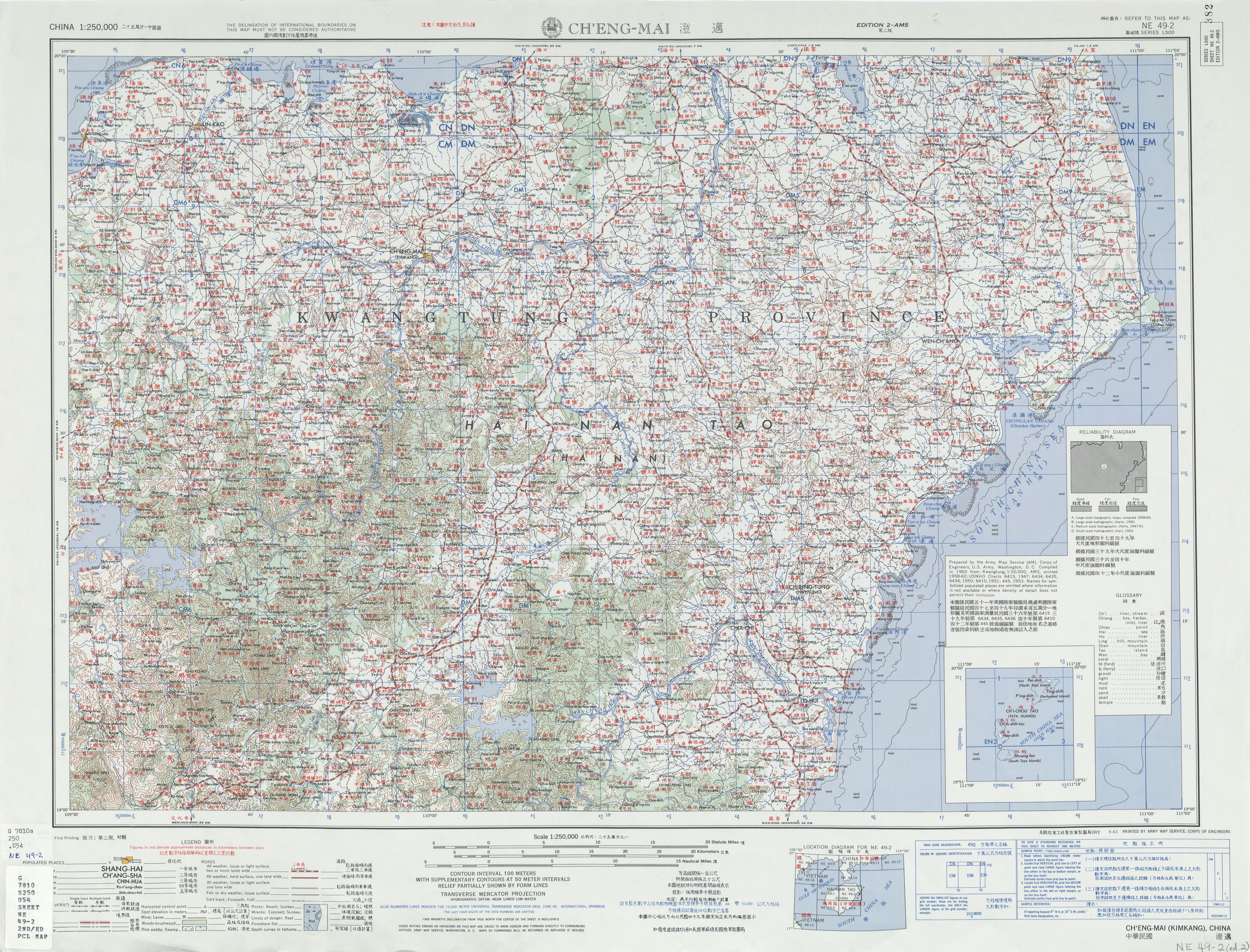
Map including the Bo'ao/Boao area (1963)

== In popular culture ==
In 2018, French singer Dantès Dailiang and Chinese singer Eva release two songs in four languages (Chinese, Russian, French and English) and two music video clips about Bo'ao.

== See also ==
- Boao Forum for Asia
