= Jianshi =

Jianshi may refer to:

== Locations ==
- Jianshi County, in Enshi, Hubei, China
- Jianshi, Hunan (剪市), a town in Taoyuan County, Hunan, China
- Jianshi, Hsinchu, a town in Hsinchu County, Taiwan
- Jianshi, Wanquan in Wanquan, Honghu, Jingzhou, Hubei, China

== Historical eras ==
- Jianshi (32BC–28BC), era name used by Emperor Cheng of Han
- Jianshi (25–27), era name used by Liu Penzi, emperor of the Han dynasty
- Jianshi (301), era name used by Sima Lun, emperor of the Jin dynasty
- Jianshi (407), era name used by Murong Xi, emperor of Later Yan

== See also ==
- Jiangshi, a type of reanimated corpse in Chinese legends and folklore
