= Changliu railway station =

Railway station in Changliu, China

Changliu 长流站
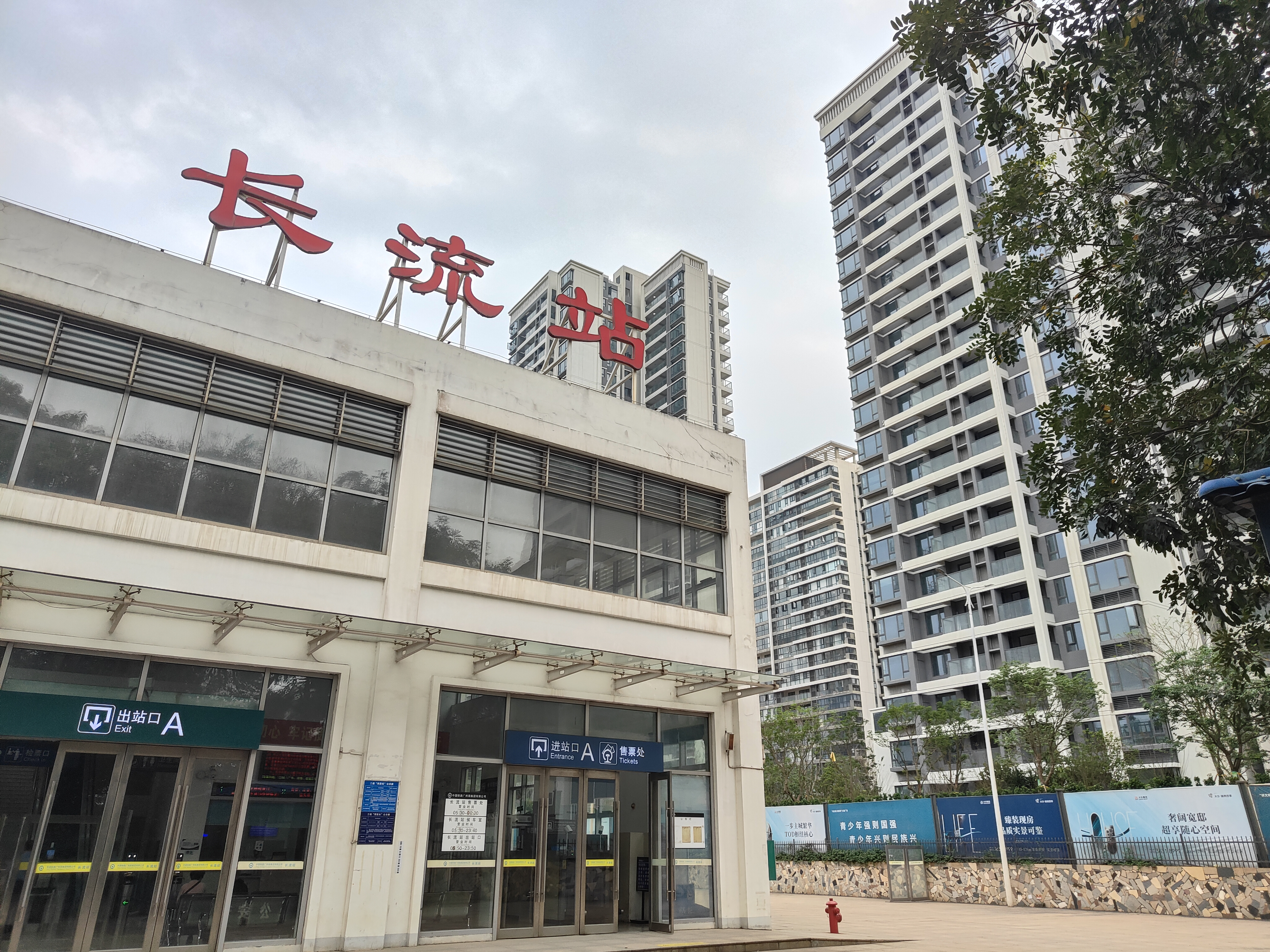

General information
- Coordinates: 20°0′42″N 110°11′20″E
- Line: Hainan eastern ring high-speed railway

History
- Opened: July 1, 2019
Location

Changliu railway station is a railway station on the Hainan eastern ring high-speed railway, serving the Changliu township, located in Hainan, China. The station opened on July 1, 2019.

Preceding station	China Railway High-speed	Following station
Haikou Terminus	Hainan eastern ring high-speed railway	Xiuying towards Sanya
