= Qionghai =

City in Hainan, China

Qionghai 琼海市
- County-level and Sub-prefectural city
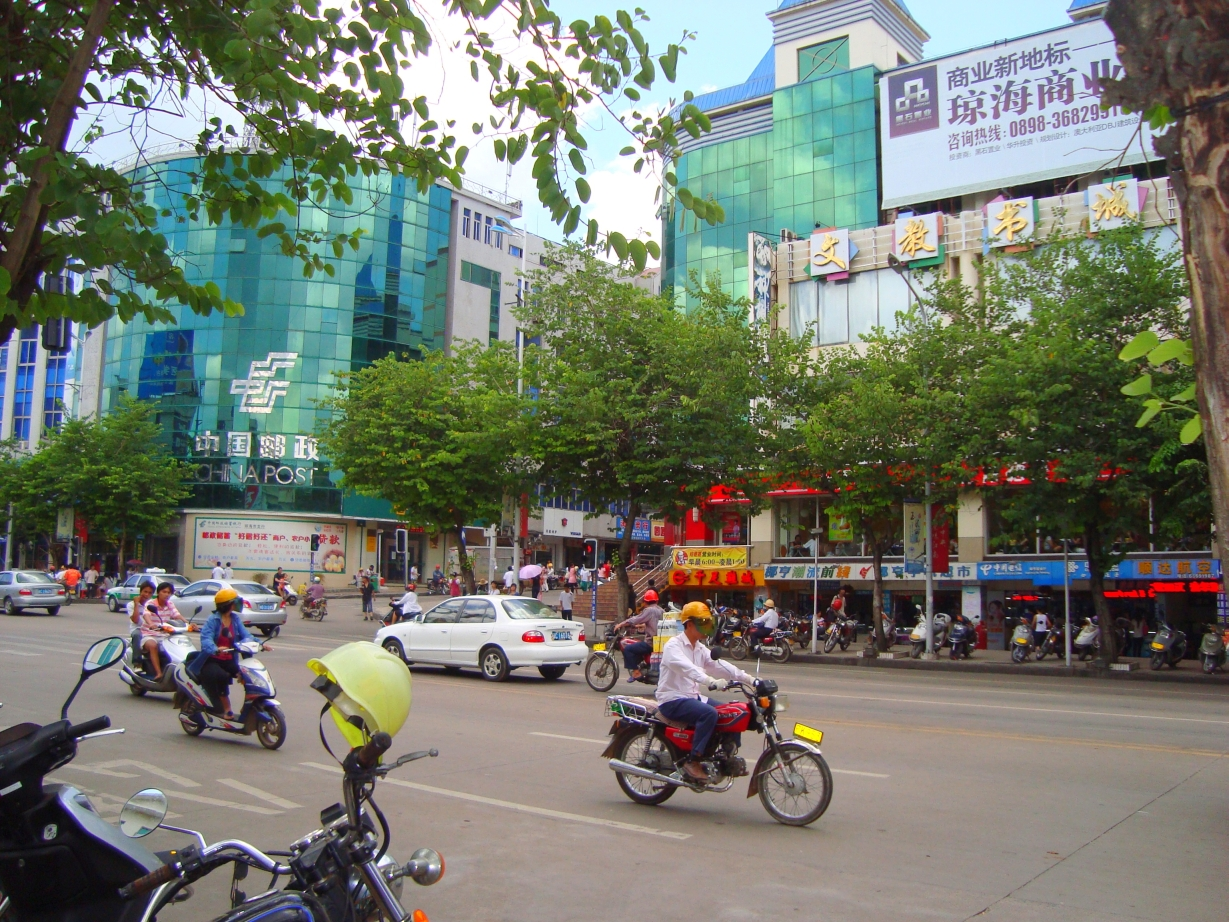

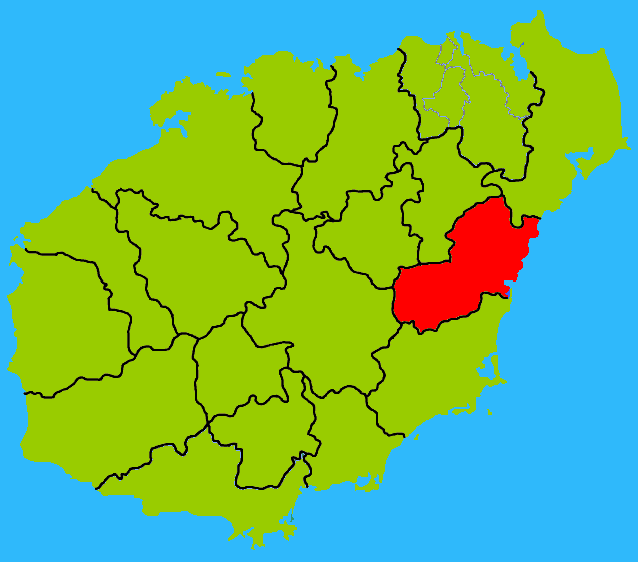
- Map showing entire Qionghai area within Hainan province
- Coordinates: 19°14′35″N 110°27′51″E
- Country: People's Republic of China
- Province: Hainan
- Township-level divisions: 12 towns
- Municipal seat: Jiaji (嘉积镇)

Area
  - Total: 1,692 km^{2} (653 sq mi)
- Elevation: 22 m (72 ft)

Population (2010)
  - Total: 483,217
  - Density: 285.6/km^{2} (739.7/sq mi)
- Time zone: UTC+8 (China Standard)
- Postal code: 571400
- Area code: 0898
- Registration plates: 琼C
- Website: qionghai.hainan.gov.cn

Qionghai, also called Keng Hai, is a county-level city in Hainan, China. It is located in the east of Hainan Island.

Kachek city was the capital of Keng Hai, which was the second largest city in Hainan island. Previous counties of Lok Wi and Keng dang were merged to create Kenghai. The town of Bo'ao, which serves as the seat for the Boao Forum for Asia, is located in the city of Qionghai.

== Climate ==
Qionghai has a tropical monsoon climate (Köppen Am). Monsoonal influences are strong, with a relatively lengthy wet season and a pronounced dry season (January to March). Rainfall is heaviest and most frequent from August to October, when typhoons may strike, and is otherwise still common throughout the year, averaging an annual total of 2,100 mm (83 in); there are 9.3 days with 50 mm (1.97 in) or more of rain. Humidity is consistently very high, with an average relative humidity of 85.8%. With monthly percent possible sunshine ranging from 31% in February to 62% in July, the city receives 1913 hours of bright sunshine annually; the city receives about only a third of possible sunshine from December through February, while May thru July is the sunniest time of year.

Climate data for Qionghai, elevation 23 m (75 ft), (1991–2020 normals, extremes 1952–present)
| Month | Jan | Feb | Mar | Apr | May | Jun | Jul | Aug | Sep | Oct | Nov | Dec | Year |
|---|---|---|---|---|---|---|---|---|---|---|---|---|---|
| Record high °C (°F) | 33.0 (91.4) | 35.0 (95.0) | 36.3 (97.3) | 38.9 (102.0) | 39.8 (103.6) | 39.2 (102.6) | 39.2 (102.6) | 38.2 (100.8) | 37.2 (99.0) | 36.0 (96.8) | 33.9 (93.0) | 30.4 (86.7) | 39.8 (103.6) |
| Mean daily maximum °C (°F) | 22.9 (73.2) | 24.3 (75.7) | 27.2 (81.0) | 30.2 (86.4) | 32.7 (90.9) | 33.6 (92.5) | 33.4 (92.1) | 33.1 (91.6) | 31.8 (89.2) | 29.5 (85.1) | 26.9 (80.4) | 23.7 (74.7) | 29.1 (84.4) |
| Daily mean °C (°F) | 19.0 (66.2) | 20.4 (68.7) | 23.1 (73.6) | 26.0 (78.8) | 28.0 (82.4) | 29.0 (84.2) | 28.8 (83.8) | 28.3 (82.9) | 27.4 (81.3) | 25.7 (78.3) | 23.3 (73.9) | 20.1 (68.2) | 24.9 (76.9) |
| Mean daily minimum °C (°F) | 16.6 (61.9) | 17.9 (64.2) | 20.6 (69.1) | 23.3 (73.9) | 25.0 (77.0) | 26.0 (78.8) | 25.8 (78.4) | 25.3 (77.5) | 24.7 (76.5) | 23.0 (73.4) | 20.9 (69.6) | 17.8 (64.0) | 22.2 (72.0) |
| Record low °C (°F) | 5.0 (41.0) | 7.2 (45.0) | 6.3 (43.3) | 10.6 (51.1) | 15.7 (60.3) | 20.8 (69.4) | 21.0 (69.8) | 21.2 (70.2) | 17.6 (63.7) | 12.8 (55.0) | 9.7 (49.5) | 5.3 (41.5) | 5.0 (41.0) |
| Average precipitation mm (inches) | 40.4 (1.59) | 49.3 (1.94) | 62.9 (2.48) | 119.1 (4.69) | 216.6 (8.53) | 174.0 (6.85) | 188.5 (7.42) | 282.3 (11.11) | 374.7 (14.75) | 419.0 (16.50) | 122.3 (4.81) | 86.8 (3.42) | 2,135.9 (84.09) |
| Average precipitation days (≥ 0.1 mm) | 10.7 | 10.2 | 10.4 | 10.6 | 14.2 | 13.5 | 13.7 | 17.6 | 17.1 | 15.5 | 12.6 | 11.4 | 157.5 |
| Average relative humidity (%) | 85 | 86 | 85 | 83 | 82 | 81 | 81 | 83 | 84 | 82 | 82 | 82 | 83 |
| Mean monthly sunshine hours | 95.8 | 101.9 | 143.0 | 174.9 | 214.7 | 220.6 | 234.1 | 212.8 | 166.7 | 150.8 | 112.4 | 85.9 | 1,913.6 |
| Percentage possible sunshine | 28 | 31 | 38 | 46 | 53 | 56 | 58 | 54 | 46 | 42 | 34 | 25 | 43 |
Source: China Meteorological Administration extremes all-time March record all-time April Record high

== Administrative divisions ==
Qionghai is divided into 12 towns:

- Jiaji (嘉积镇)
- Wanquan (万泉镇)
- Shibi (石壁镇)
- Zhongyuan (中原镇)
- Bo'ao/Boao (博鳌镇)
- Yangjiang (阳江镇)
- Longjiang (龙江镇)
- Tanmen (潭门镇)
- Tayang (塔洋镇)
- Changpo (长坡镇)
- Dalu (大路镇)
- Huishan (会山镇)

== Other ==
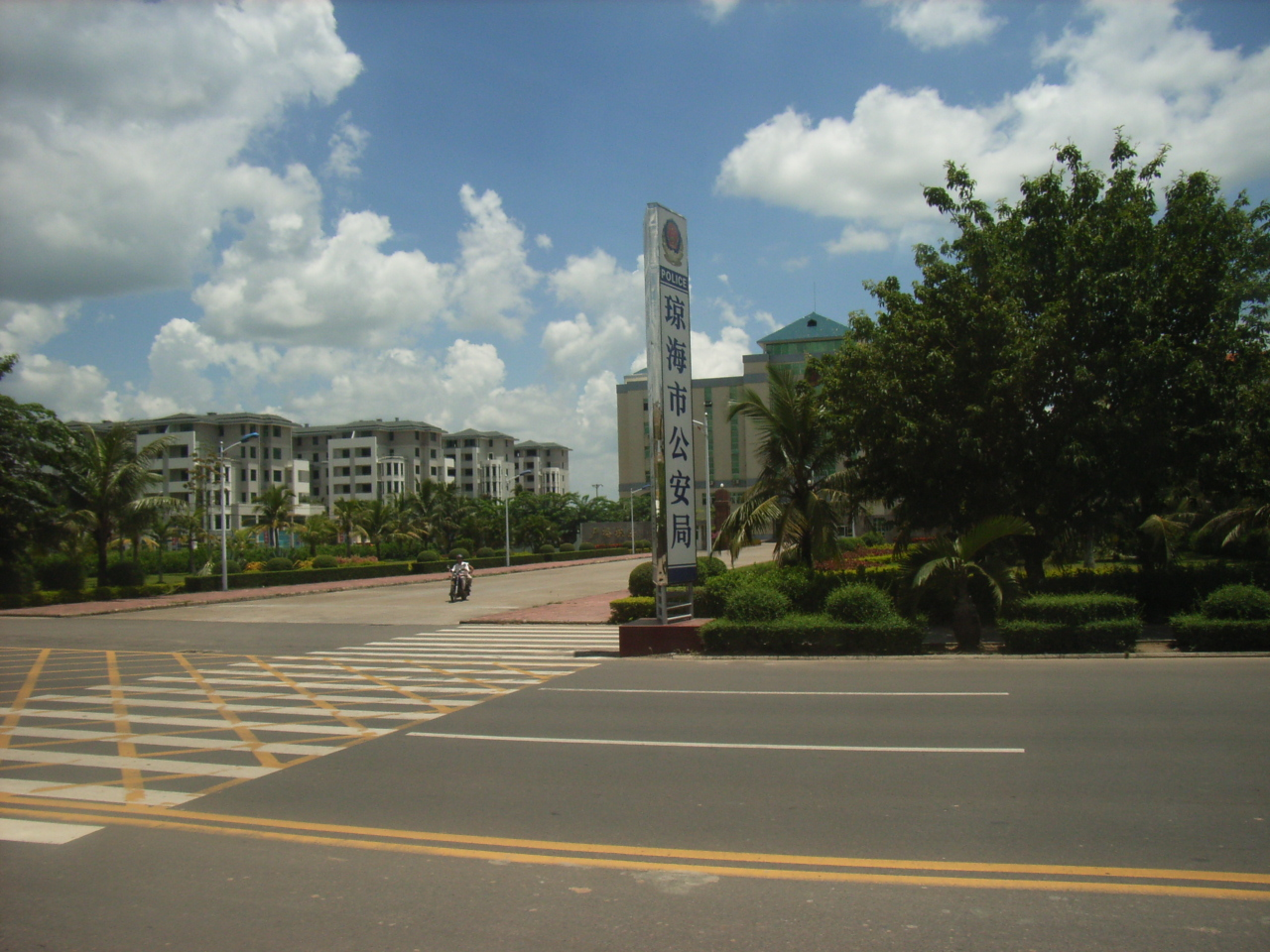
Qionghai Police Station

The most famous dish of Qionghai is Kachek Duck.

Qionghai is served by Qionghai Bo'ao Airport.

Qionghai is also well known for being the home of the Red Detachment of Women from the revolutionary model opera which was also adapted into film. The Red Detachment of Women Memorial Park in Qionghai was developed in 1998. The park includes revolutionary-themed sculpture, a museum, coconut groves, and live performances. In 2005, it was recognized as a National Classic Red Tourism Attraction by China National Tourism Administration and other government bodies.

== Notable people ==
- Lee Chiaw Meng, served in Prime Minister Lee Kuan Yew's cabinet as Minister of Education, Minister of Science and Technology and Member of Parliament.
- Patrick Lee, billionaire business entrepreneur, magnate, and founder of Lee & Man Paper.
- Pang Chin Hin (冯振轩), entrepreneur, chairman and founder of the well-known food manufacturing company Mamee Double-Decker (M) Sdn Bhd.
- Pang Lim (庞琳), entrepreneur who founded the Koufu Group Ltd, an F&B establishment operator.
- Namewee, rapper, musician and filmmaker.

== See also ==
- List of administrative divisions of Hainan
