= Patrick Lee (Chinese businessman) =

Chinese businessman

- Born: Qionghai, Hainan
- Known for: Lee & Man Paper

Patrick Lee is a Chinese business magnate and the founder of Lee & Man Paper, a large industrial packaging corporation based in Hong Kong. Lee created the company in 1994.
