= Lingshui railway station =

Railway station in Hainan, China

Lingshui 陵水
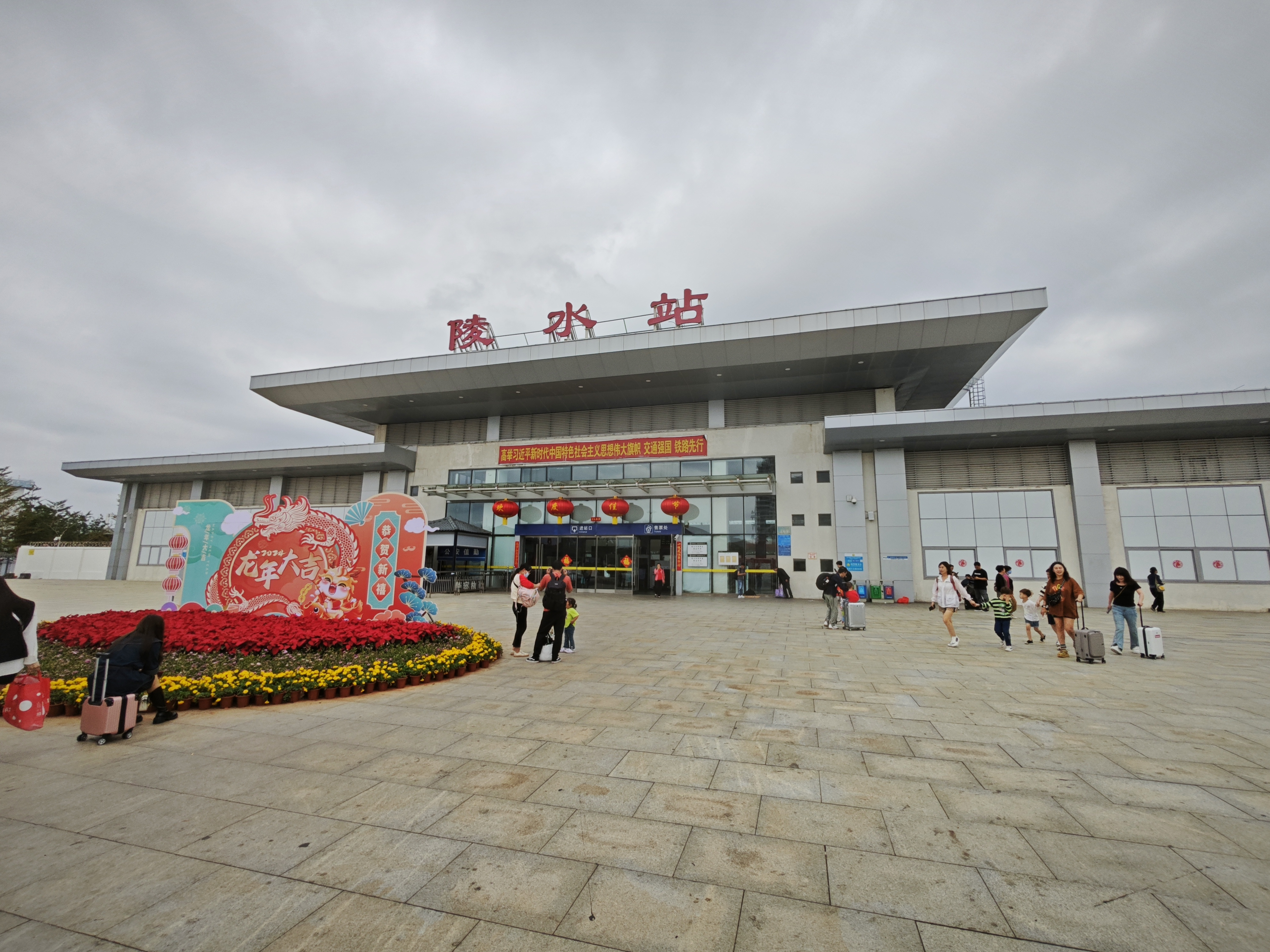

General information
- Coordinates: 18°32′17″N 110°01′43″E
- Line: Hainan eastern ring high-speed railway
Location

Lingshui railway station (陵水站) is a railway station on the Hainan eastern ring high-speed railway located in the town of Lingshui, Lingshui Li Autonomous County, Hainan, China.

Preceding station	China Railway High-speed	Following station
Shenzhou towards Haikou	Hainan eastern ring high-speed railway	Yalong Bay towards Sanya
