= Meilan railway station =

Railway station in Hainan, China

Meilan 美兰
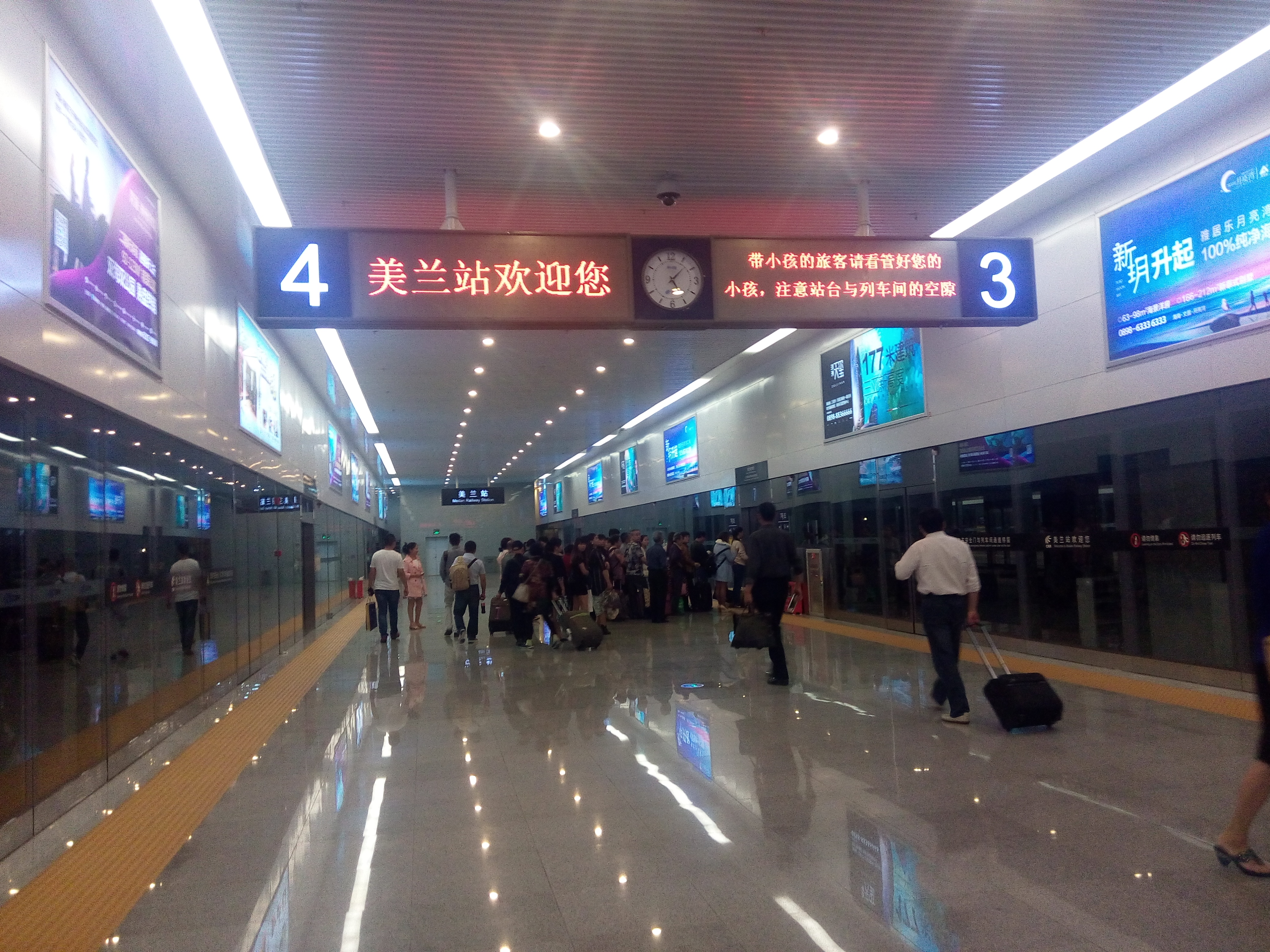

General information
- Coordinates: 19°56′39″N 110°27′20″E
- Line: Hainan eastern ring high-speed railway
Location

Meilan railway station
- Simplified Chinese: 美兰站
Transcriptions

Meilan railway station (Chinese: 美兰站) is a railway station on the Hainan eastern ring high-speed railway located in Hainan, People's Republic of China. It is connected to the Haikou Meilan International Airport, which is the main airport of the Hainan island, and one of the busiest in China. Hence, travellers typically land in the Haikou Meilan International Airport, and then reach their final destination on the Hainan island using the railway.

== See also ==
- Haikou Meilan International Airport

Preceding station	China Railway High-speed	Following station
Haikou East towards Haikou	Hainan eastern ring high-speed railway	Wenchang towards Sanya
