= Qionghai railway station =

Railway station in Hainan, China

Qionghai 琼海
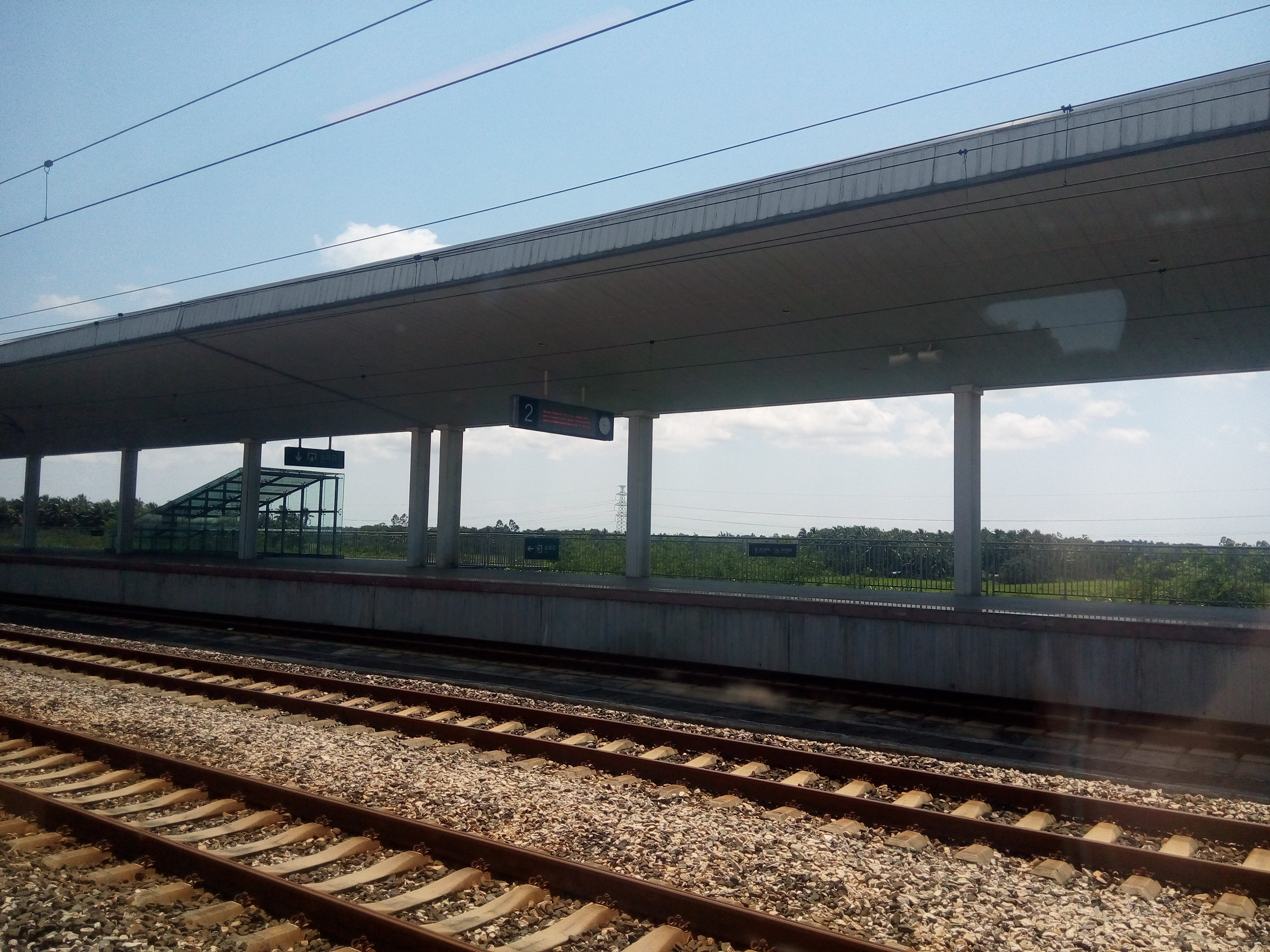

General information
- Coordinates: 19°14′29″N 110°29′15″E
- Line: Hainan eastern ring high-speed railway
Location

Qionghai railway station is a railway station on the Hainan eastern ring high-speed railway located in Hainan, China.

Preceding station	China Railway High-speed	Following station
Wenchang towards Haikou	Hainan eastern ring high-speed railway	Bo'ao towards Sanya
