= Xiuying railway station =

Railway station in Hainan, China

Xiuying 秀英
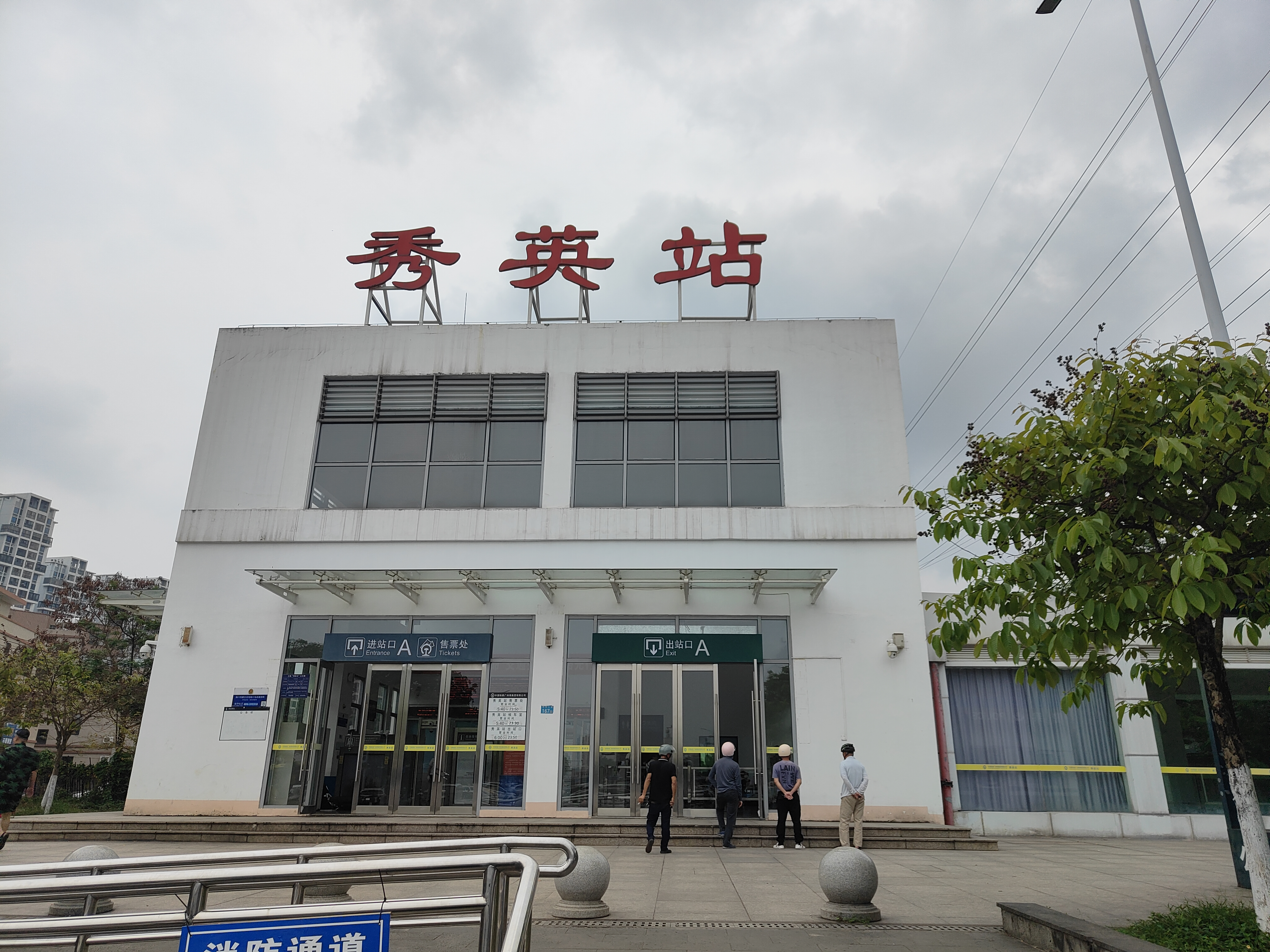

General information
- Coordinates: 19°59′54″N 110°16′17″E
- Line: Hainan eastern ring high-speed railway

History
- Opened: July 1, 2019
Location

Xiuying railway station is a railway station on the Hainan eastern ring high-speed railway, serving the Xiuying district, located in Hainan, China. The station was opened on July 1, 2019.

Preceding station	China Railway High-speed	Following station
Changliu towards Haikou	Hainan eastern ring high-speed railway	Chengxi towards Sanya
