= Wanning railway station =

Railway station in Wanning, China

Wanning 万宁
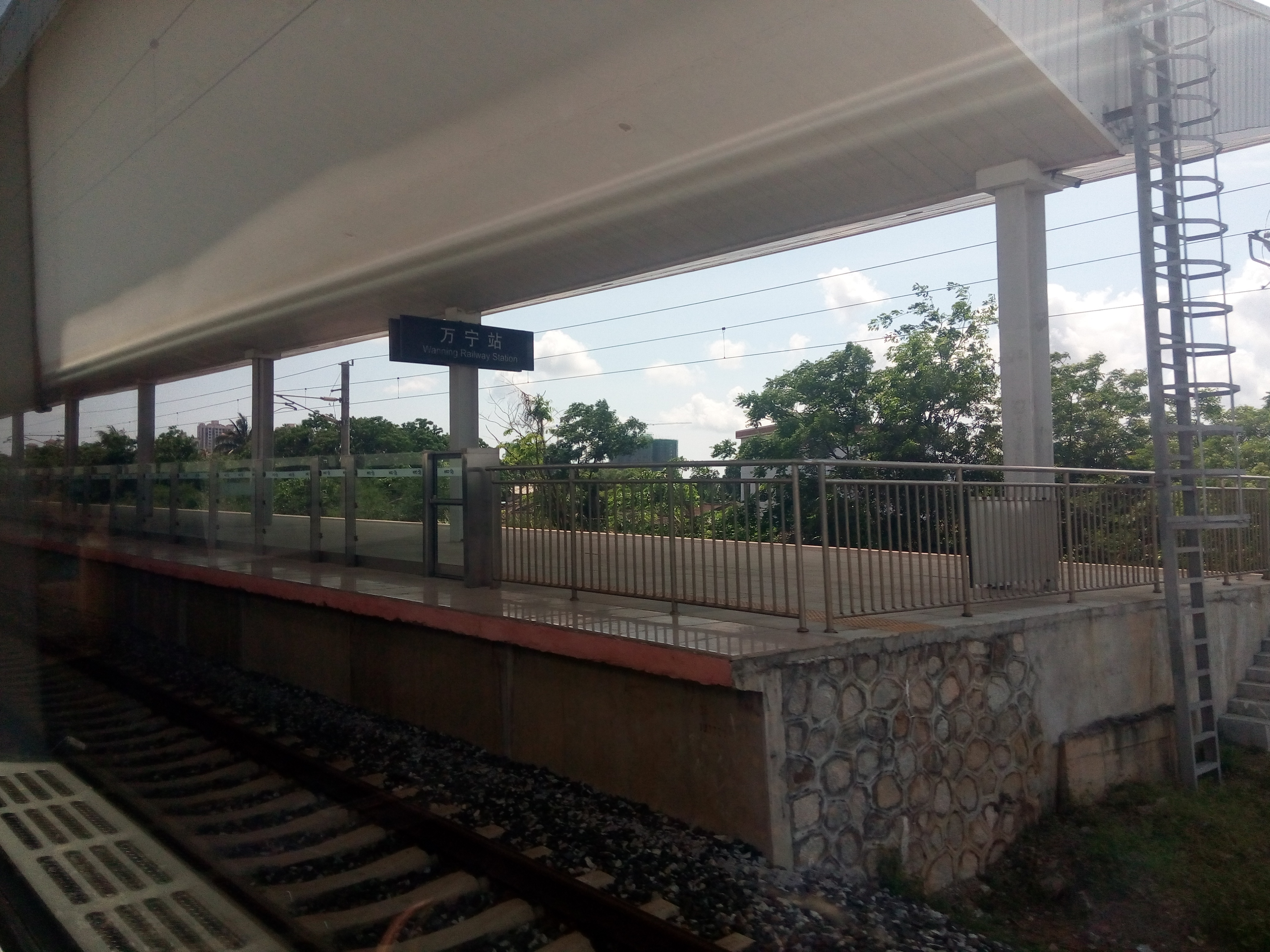

General information
- Coordinates: 18°48′39″N 110°22′34″E
- Line: Hainan eastern ring high-speed railway
Location

Wanning railway station (IATA: WXJ) is a railway station on the Hainan eastern ring high-speed railway, serving the county-level city of Wanning, located in Hainan, China. The station serves as a key transportation hub as it provides access to Wanning and other parts of Hainan island.

| Preceding station | China Railway High-speed | Following station |
|---|---|---|
| Bo'ao towards Haikou | Hainan eastern ring high-speed railway | Shenzhou towards Sanya |
