= Wenchang railway station =

Railway station in Wenchang, Hainan, China

Wenchang 文昌
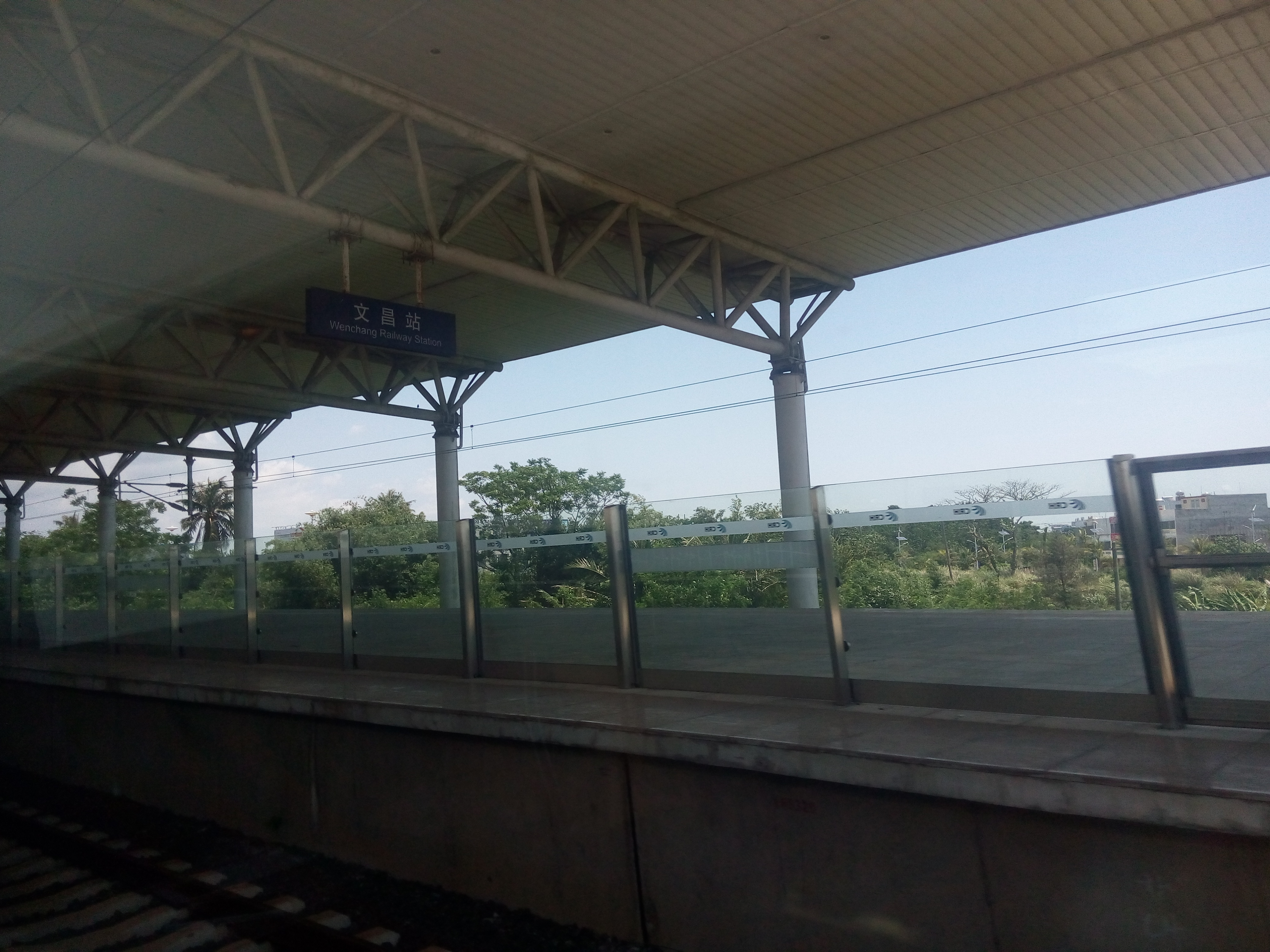

General information
- Coordinates: 19°36′28″N 110°43′57″E
- Line: Hainan eastern ring high-speed railway
Location

Wenchang railway station is a railway station on the Hainan eastern ring high-speed railway located in Hainan, China.

Preceding station	China Railway High-speed	Following station
Meilan towards Haikou	Hainan eastern ring high-speed railway	Qionghai towards Sanya
