= Wanning =

Wanning 万宁市
- County-level & Sub-prefectural city
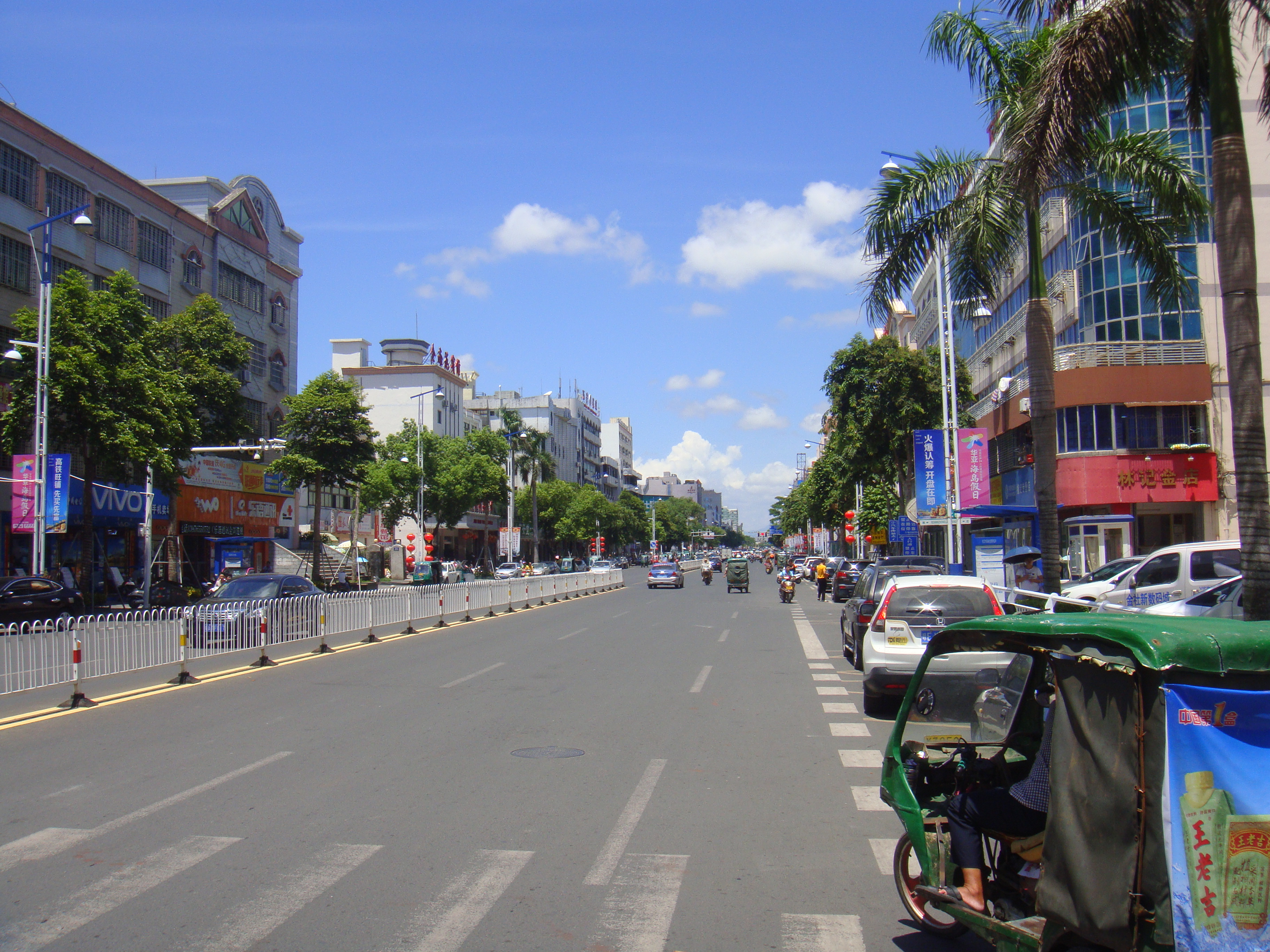
- Wancheng Town, the seat of Wanning

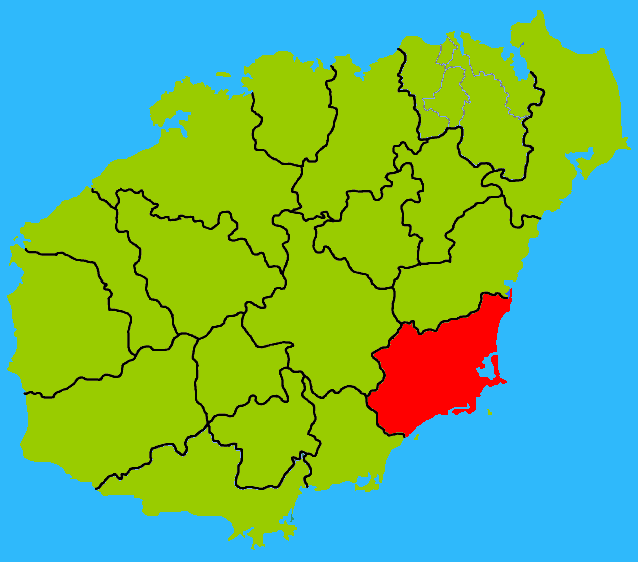
- Map showing entire Qionghai area within Hainan province
- Coordinates: 18°47′0″N 110°23′0″E
- Country: People's Republic of China
- Province: Hainan

Area
  - Total: 4,443 km^{2} (1,715 sq mi)
  - Land: 1,883.5 km^{2} (727.2 sq mi)
  - Water: 2,550 km^{2} (980 sq mi)

Population (2010)
  - Total: 545,597
  - Density: 289.67/km^{2} (750.25/sq mi)
- Time zone: UTC+8 (China standard time)

Wanning
- Traditional Chinese: 萬寧
- Simplified Chinese: 万宁
- Postal: Manning
- Literal meaning: Uncountably Long Peace
Transcriptions
Standard Mandarin
- Hanyu Pinyin: Wànníng
- Wade–Giles: Wan-ning
Yue: Cantonese
- Jyutping: Maan⁶-ning⁴

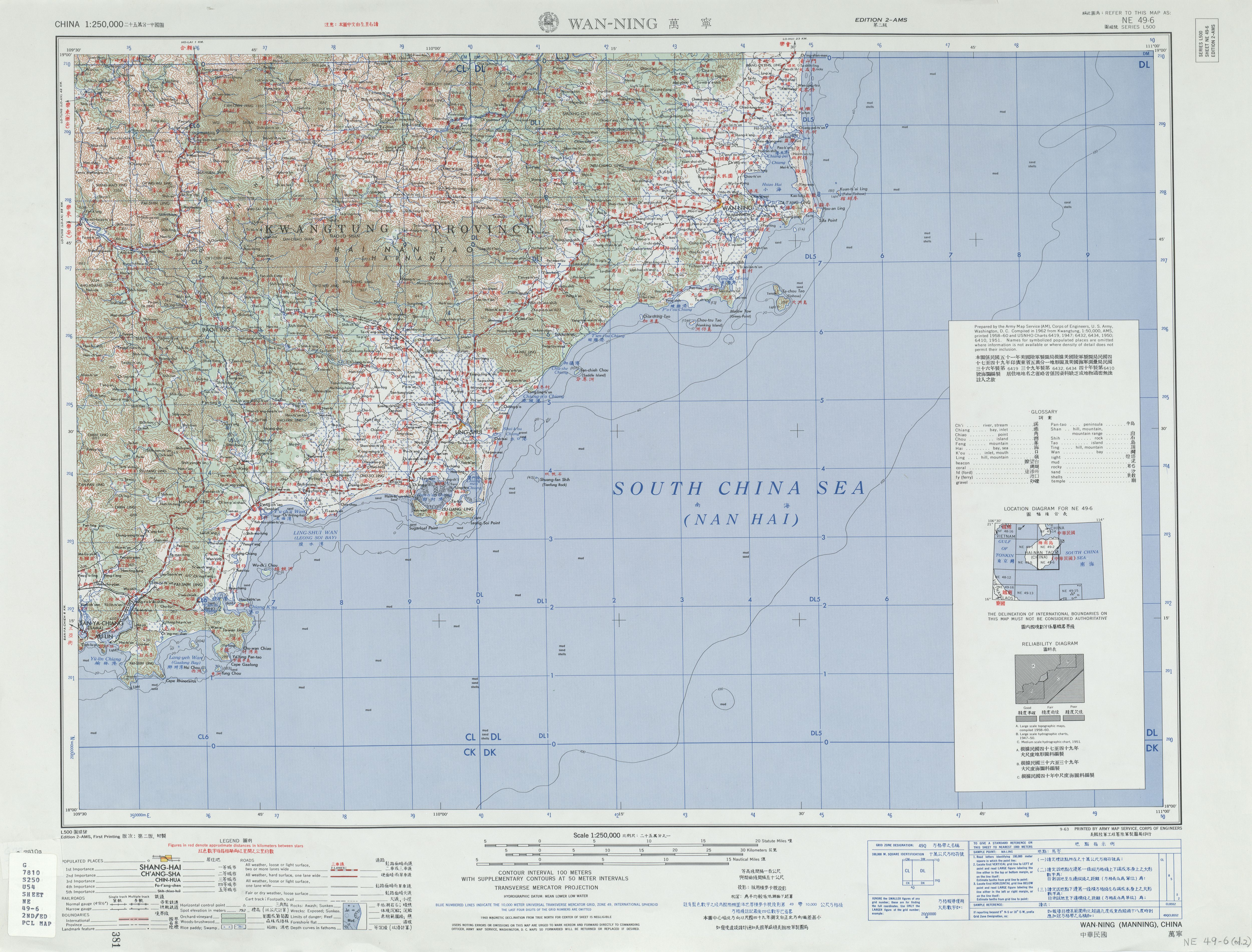
Wanning (1962)

Wanning, or in local Hainamese dialect as Van Neing or Ban Neing, is a county-level city in the southeast of Hainan Province, China. Although called a "city", Wanning refers to both the county seat and to the entire county as a whole. The county-wide area has an estimated population of 65,871 (2006).

== History ==
Wanning (万宁) first got its current name during 1117 or 1122, after being renamed from Wan'an (万安县). Wanning was later renamed back to Wan'an in 1143 until its name was changed to Wanzhou (万州) in 1370, but subsequently reverted to its present name after the Communist takeover in the 1950s. It was promoted from a county to a city on August 5, 1996.

== Economy ==
Tourism plays a vital role in the city. Famous for its tropical scenery, Wanning proper lies approximately half an hour's drive from the beach and has several five-star hotels. The city of Wanning produces coffee, black pepper, rubber, rice, bananas, and sugarcane.

== Transportation ==
Wanning is served by the Wanning Railway Station, part of the Hainan East Ring Intercity Rail.

== Climate ==
Wanning has a tropical monsoon climate (Köppen: Am), falling just short of a tropical rainforest climate, as it is hot and very rainy most of the year. Only January and February have rainfall barely below 60 millimetres or 2.4 inches. The rainfall is more pronounced during the monsoon season, which runs through late June to early November. At times, it can become cold with temperatures between 5 and 8 degrees Celsius.

Climate data for Wanning, elevation 40 m (130 ft), (1991–2020 normals, extremes 1963–present)
| Month | Jan | Feb | Mar | Apr | May | Jun | Jul | Aug | Sep | Oct | Nov | Dec | Year |
|---|---|---|---|---|---|---|---|---|---|---|---|---|---|
| Record high °C (°F) | 30.3 (86.5) | 30.7 (87.3) | 32.4 (90.3) | 34.0 (93.2) | 35.9 (96.6) | 37.1 (98.8) | 36.7 (98.1) | 37.1 (98.8) | 35.7 (96.3) | 35.5 (95.9) | 31.4 (88.5) | 30.6 (87.1) | 37.1 (98.8) |
| Mean daily maximum °C (°F) | 23.3 (73.9) | 24.5 (76.1) | 27.0 (80.6) | 29.7 (85.5) | 31.9 (89.4) | 32.6 (90.7) | 32.3 (90.1) | 32.4 (90.3) | 31.4 (88.5) | 29.3 (84.7) | 26.8 (80.2) | 23.8 (74.8) | 28.8 (83.7) |
| Daily mean °C (°F) | 19.6 (67.3) | 20.8 (69.4) | 23.4 (74.1) | 26.1 (79.0) | 28.1 (82.6) | 28.9 (84.0) | 28.6 (83.5) | 28.4 (83.1) | 27.4 (81.3) | 25.8 (78.4) | 23.5 (74.3) | 20.5 (68.9) | 25.1 (77.2) |
| Mean daily minimum °C (°F) | 17.1 (62.8) | 18.4 (65.1) | 21.0 (69.8) | 23.7 (74.7) | 25.5 (77.9) | 26.3 (79.3) | 26.0 (78.8) | 25.6 (78.1) | 24.7 (76.5) | 23.2 (73.8) | 21.2 (70.2) | 18.3 (64.9) | 22.6 (72.7) |
| Record low °C (°F) | 6.2 (43.2) | 8.7 (47.7) | 7.4 (45.3) | 15.2 (59.4) | 17.1 (62.8) | 21.3 (70.3) | 21.9 (71.4) | 22.4 (72.3) | 20.2 (68.4) | 14.7 (58.5) | 11.7 (53.1) | 7.2 (45.0) | 6.2 (43.2) |
| Average precipitation mm (inches) | 46.5 (1.83) | 47.3 (1.86) | 66.8 (2.63) | 124.7 (4.91) | 172.1 (6.78) | 182.0 (7.17) | 233.4 (9.19) | 211.3 (8.32) | 372.1 (14.65) | 453.2 (17.84) | 181.2 (7.13) | 129.8 (5.11) | 2,220.4 (87.42) |
| Average precipitation days (≥ 0.1 mm) | 9.9 | 8.2 | 8.6 | 9.3 | 12.8 | 13.9 | 14.6 | 15.4 | 17.1 | 17.2 | 14.8 | 12.9 | 154.7 |
| Average relative humidity (%) | 84 | 85 | 85 | 84 | 83 | 82 | 82 | 83 | 85 | 83 | 83 | 83 | 84 |
| Mean monthly sunshine hours | 107.9 | 114.8 | 144.4 | 182.0 | 220.7 | 216.7 | 226.1 | 214.3 | 168.1 | 153.3 | 113.5 | 94.3 | 1,956.1 |
| Percentage possible sunshine | 31 | 35 | 39 | 48 | 55 | 55 | 56 | 55 | 46 | 43 | 34 | 28 | 44 |
Source: China Meteorological Administration all-time extreme low
