= Chengxi railway station =

Railway station in Hainan, China

Chengxi 城西
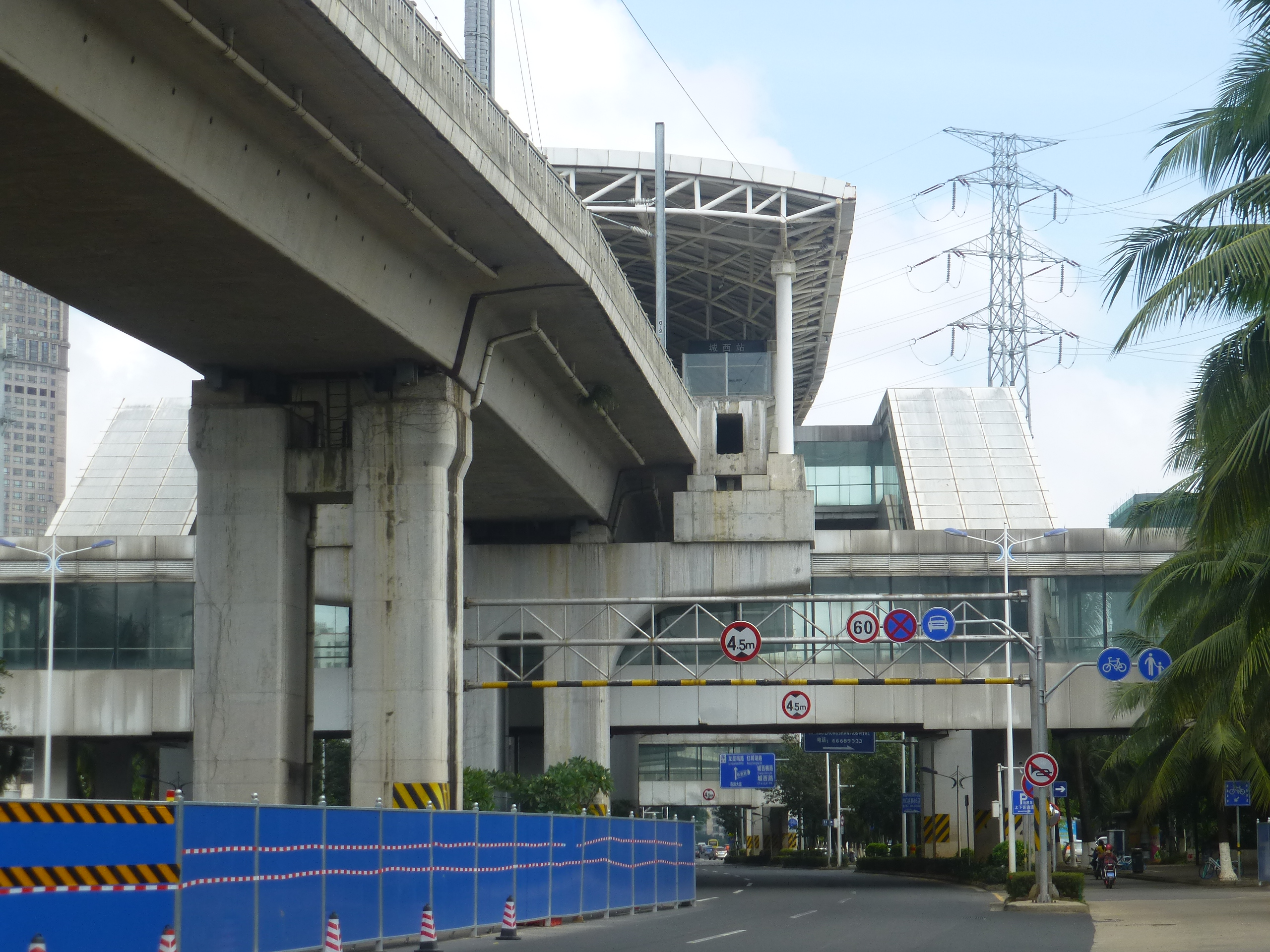
- View from the west

General information
- Coordinates: 19°58′45″N 110°19′40″E
- Line: Hainan eastern ring high-speed railway

History
- Opened: July 1, 2019
Location

Chengxi railway station is a railway station on the Hainan eastern ring high-speed railway, serving the Chengxi township, located in Hainan, People's Republic of China. The station was opened on July 1, 2019.

Preceding station	China Railway High-speed	Following station
Xiuying towards Haikou	Hainan eastern ring high-speed railway	Haikou East towards Sanya
