= Wanquan River =

Coordinates: 19.155182°N 110.585418°E

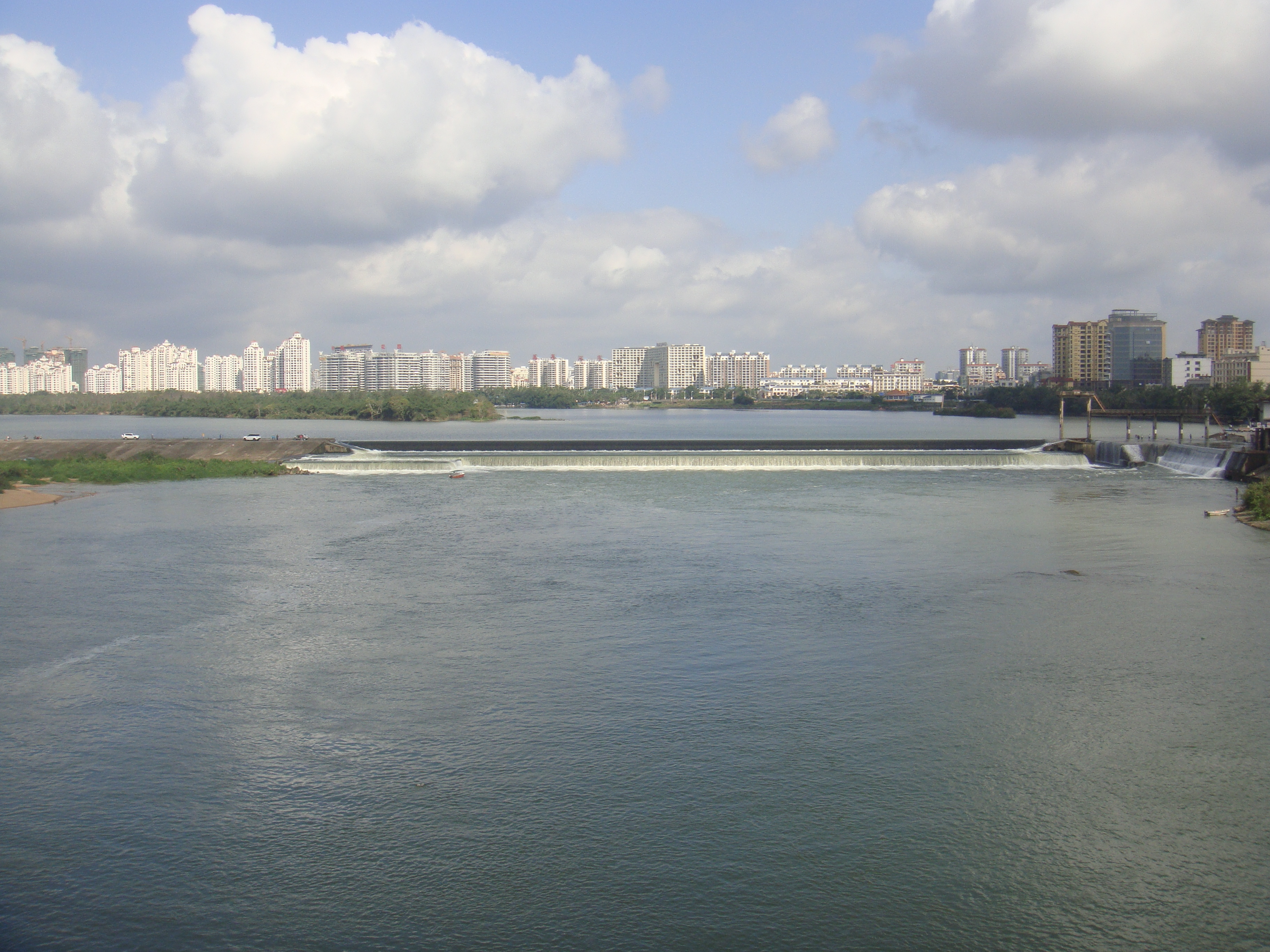
- Wanquan River at Qionghai viewed from the bridge directly south that carries Aihua W Rd./China National Highway 223

Location
- Country: China

Physical characteristics
- Mouth
  - location: South China Sea at Bo'ao
- Length: 162 km (101 mi)

The Wanquan River (Chinese: 万泉河; pinyin: Wànquán Hé; lit. 'ten-thousand-spring river') is the third longest river in Hainan Province, China, and is 162 km long. It rises in the Wuzhi Mountain, and flows generally northeast turbulently in a narrow route through mountainous regions. About halfway downstream, it enters Qionghai. Here the river bed widens and the water flows gently, and on the banks are mostly coconut trees and banana plantations. For its last 30 km, the river makes a southeast turn, and before it empties into the South China Sea at Bo'ao, where it joins the Longgun River and Jiuqu River in a common estuary.

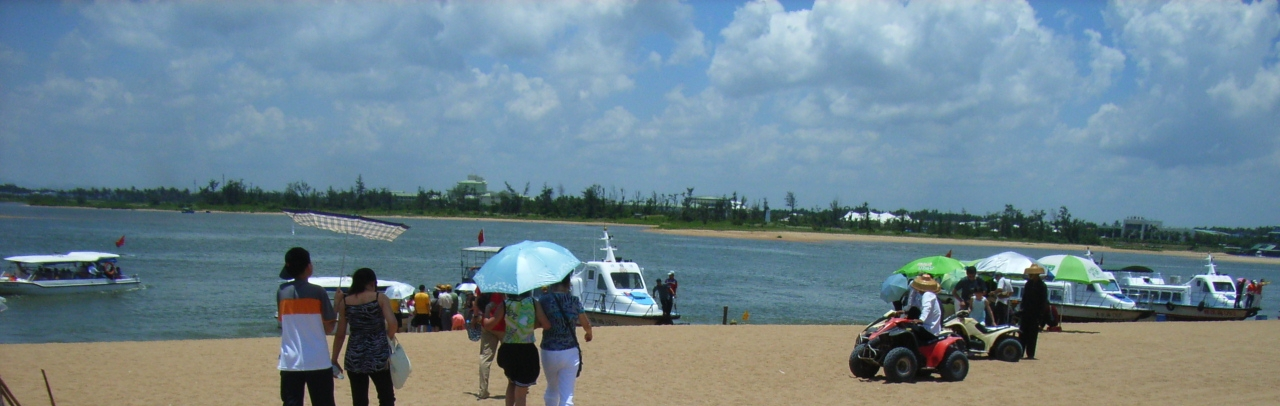
Wanquan River at Bo'ao

In the ballet, Red Detachment of Women, the People's Liberation Army set their camp beside the Wanquan River.
