= Yalongwan railway station =

Railway station in Sanya, China

Yalongwan 亚龙湾
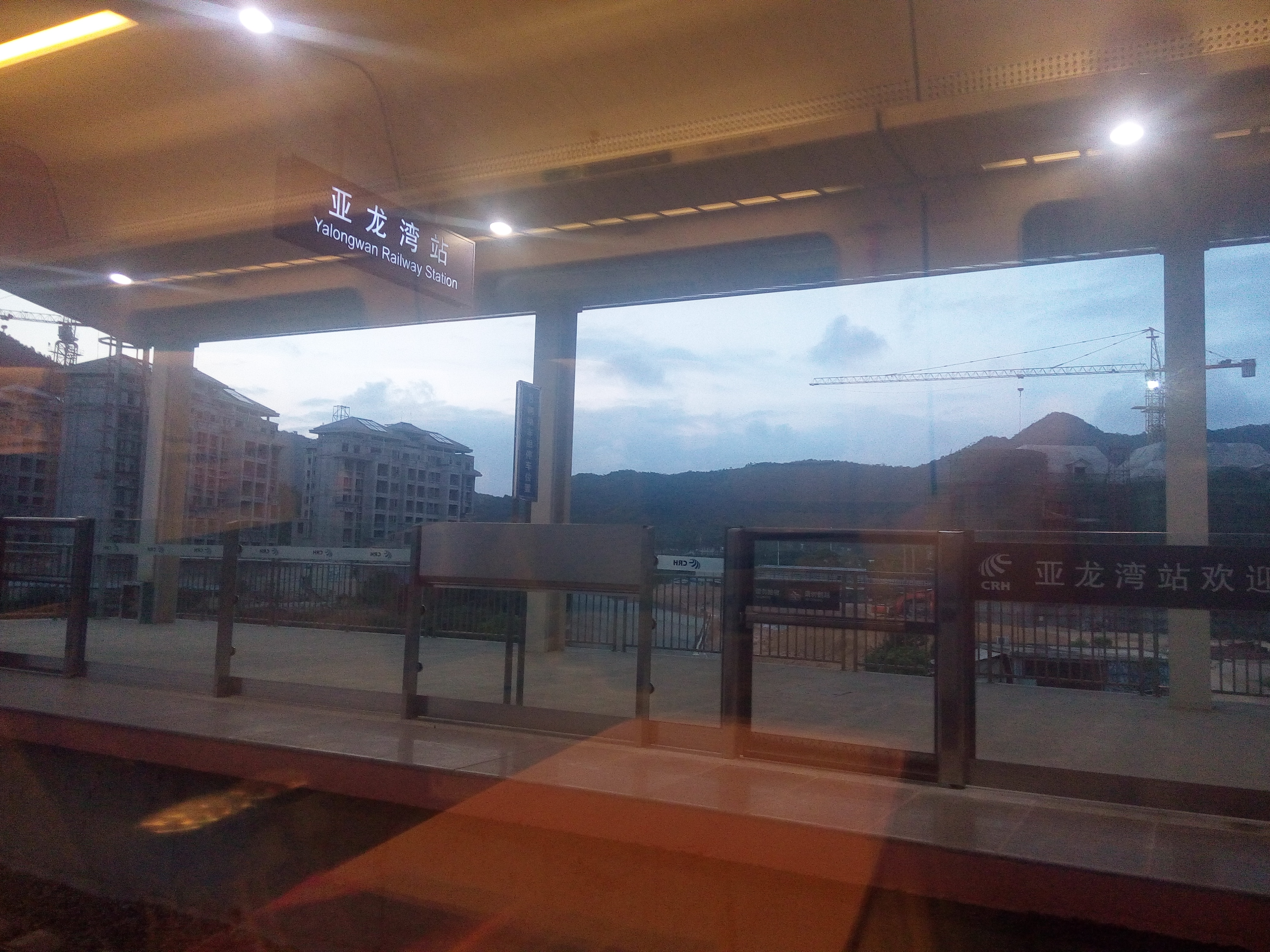

General information
- Coordinates: 18°18′16″N 109°35′52″E
- Line: Hainan eastern ring high-speed railway
Location

Yalongwan railway station (Chinese: 亚龙湾站; pinyin: Yàlóngwān zhàn; lit. 'Yalong Bay railway station') is a railway station on the Hainan eastern ring high-speed railway, serving the Yalong Bay, located in Tiandu town, Jiyang District, Sanya City, Hainan, China.

Preceding station	China Railway High-speed	Following station
Lingshui towards Haikou	Hainan eastern ring high-speed railway	Sanya Terminus
