= Wanquan, Gansu =

Wanquan 万泉镇
- Town
- Location in Gansu
- Coordinates: 35°5′15″N 105°51′22″E
- Country: People's Republic of China
- Province: Gansu
- Prefecture-level city: Pingliang
- County: Zhuanglang County
- Time zone: UTC+8 (China Standard)

Wanquan (simplified Chinese: 万泉; traditional Chinese: 萬泉; pinyin: Wànquán) is a town under the administration of Zhuanglang County, Gansu, China. As of 2018, it has 21 villages under its administration.
