= Wanquan, Hainan =

Wanquan 万泉镇
- Town
- Location in Hainan
- Coordinates: 19°14′38″N 110°24′18″E
- Country: People's Republic of China
- Province: Hainan
- County-level city: Qionghai
- Time zone: UTC+8 (China Standard)

Wanquan is a town in the city of Qionghai, Hainan, China. As of 2018, it has two residential communities and 16 villages under its administration.
