= Hainan eastern ring high-speed railway =

Railway line in China

Hainan Eastern Ring HSR
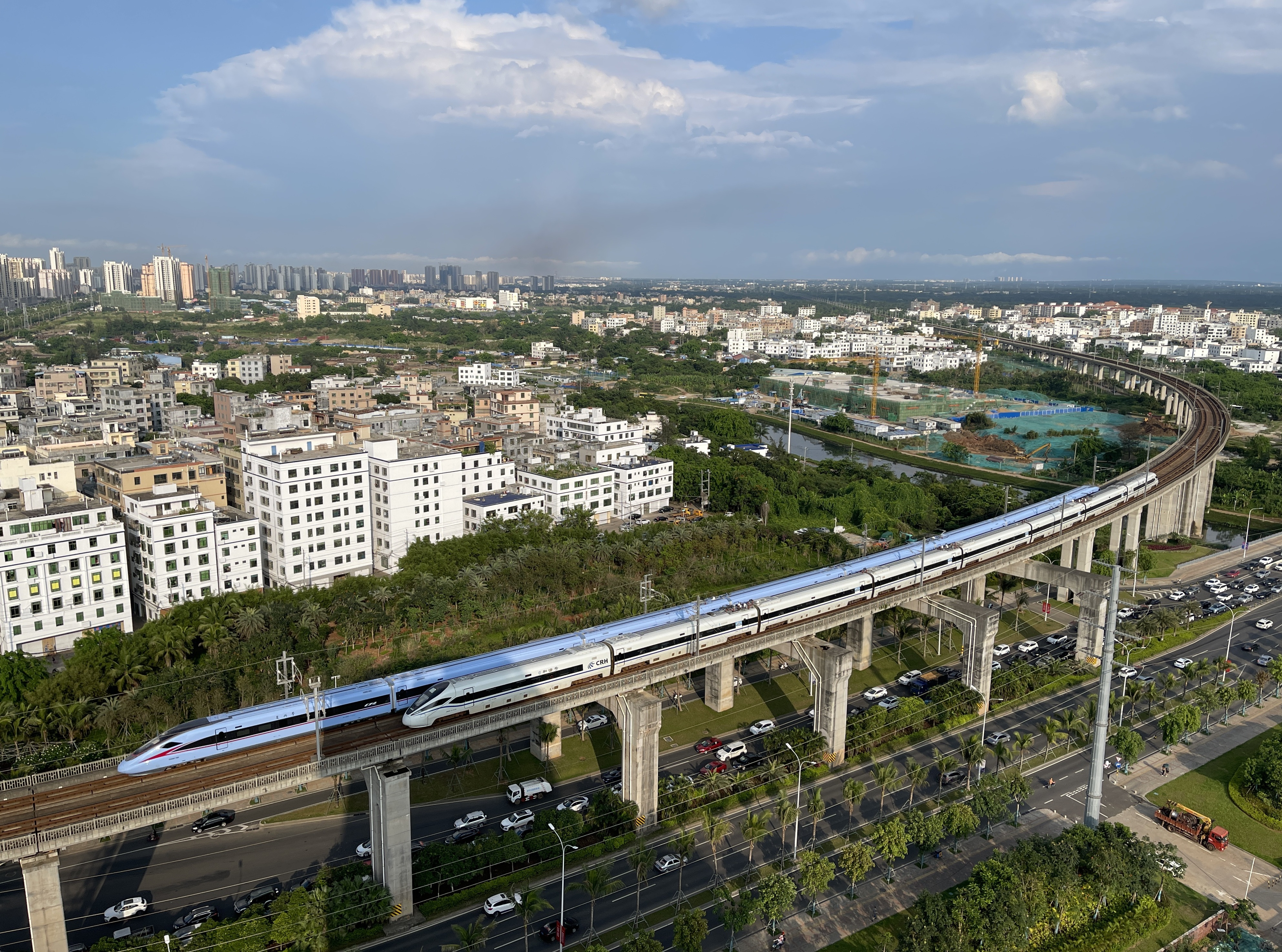
- CR300AF and CRH1A-A on the Hainan Eastern Ring HSR

Overview
- Native name: 海南东环高速铁路 (海南东环铁路, 海南东环高铁)
- Status: Operational
- Owner: China Railway
- Locale: Eastern Hainan
- Termini: Haikou; Sanya
- Stations: 15

Service
- Type: High-speed railway, Loop line
- System: China Railway High-speed
- Services: 2
- Operator(s): Hainan Railway Company Limited of China Railway Guangzhou Group
- Rolling stock: CRH1A-A; CRH6F-A; CR300-AF

History
- Commenced: 29 September 2007
- Opened: 30 December 2010

Technical
- Line length: 308 km (191 mi)
- Character: Elevated
- Track gauge: 1,435 mm (4 ft 8 1/2 in) standard gauge
- Minimum radius: 5,500 m (18,000 ft)
- Electrification: 25 kV 50 Hz AC (Overhead line)
- Operating speed: 250 km/h (155 mph)

Chinese name
- Simplified Chinese: 海南东环铁路
- Traditional Chinese: 海南東環鐵路
- Literal meaning: Hainan eastern ring railway
Transcriptions
Standard Mandarin
- Hanyu Pinyin: Hǎinán dōnghuán tiělù

The Hainan eastern ring high-speed railway is a high-speed railway on Hainan Island. It is operated by China Railway Guangzhou Group. Opened in December 2010, the railway links the capital Haikou at the northern end of the province, and goes alongside the eastern coastline to reach the resort city of Sanya in the southernmost region of the island. The railway share the end points with the Hainan western ring high-speed railway, which together creates a closed loop spanning 653 kms, as well as the world’s first circular high-speed railway, and allows passengers to travel around Hainan island (roughly same distance as circling Belgium) in about 3 hours.

== History ==
The idea for the railway was first proposed in February 1958 by then Vice-Premier and Director of the National Planning Commission, Li Fuchun, during an inspection tour of Hainan. The original proposal was for a railway that would go completely around the island. It would incorporate several railway sections that had recently been, or were about to be, reconstructed in the southwestern part of the island (see Hainan western ring railway).

In February 1960, Premier Zhou Enlai visited Hainan and created a construction blueprint. In May 1963, Li Fuchun returned to inspect Hainan. His intention was for a ten-year plan to complete the railway. This was interrupted by the Cultural Revolution, and the plan was suspended.

In the summer of 1980, the State Council made the decision to speed up development and construction on Hainan Island.

The Guangdong–Hainan Train Ferry (part of the Guangdong–Hainan railway) was completed in December 2004, and the Hainan western ring railway along the western coast of the island from Haikou to Sanya was completed in 2005.

Preparation for the construction project in the eastern half of the island officially started in March 2006, with the National Development and Reform Commission officially approving the feasibility report on March 22, 2007. Construction began on September 29, 2007, and the railway went into service on December 30, 2010.

With a projected cost of over 22.22 billion RMB (approximately US$3.3 billion) shared between China's Ministry of Railways and the Hainan provincial government, this was Hainan's largest single investment project to date and employed a workforce of 50,000. Items of expenditure included 17.7 billion RMB on fixed assets and 1.5 billion RMB on trains.

The official opening and start of operations of the eastern ring railway took place on December 30, 2010 with a trial run. At the opening ceremony, Luo Baoming, governor of Hainan, stated that the railway will promote urbanization and greatly improve the island's transportation capacity.

The line was put into revenue service on January 7, 2011. The intercity service of the line, which is from Haikou to Meilan, was started to service on July 1, 2019.

== Trains ==
From March 8, 2011, CRH380A trains served the route, although track limitations restrict their maximum speed to 250 km/h (160 mph). The trains have since been transferred to Beijing Railway Bureau and are no longer in service.

Services are now provided by CRH1A type Harmony ("Hexie Hao" simplified Chinese: 和谐号; traditional Chinese: 和諧號; pinyin: Héxié Hào) EMU trains, with a total length of 213.5 metres (700 feet) and a total weight of 420.4 long tons (427.1 tonnes), and a top speed of approximately 250 km/h (160 mph).

Each train comprises eight cars, including five power cars, and three trailers. Passenger cars comprise two first-class and five second-class cars, and one dining car. The first-class cars are model Dingyuan 64, and the second-class cars are Dingyuan 92. The dining car provides fast food and drinks. Washrooms are designed to accommodate disabled people.

On November 18, 2016, new CRH1A-A EMUs entered into service, replacing the CRH1A units.

The CRH6F-A was put into service on July 1, 2019, with the opening of intercity service between Haikou and Meilan.

On January 31, 2021, 5 new Fuxing EMU was delivered from Guangdong–Hainan Ferry and it was put into service on February 1, 2021.

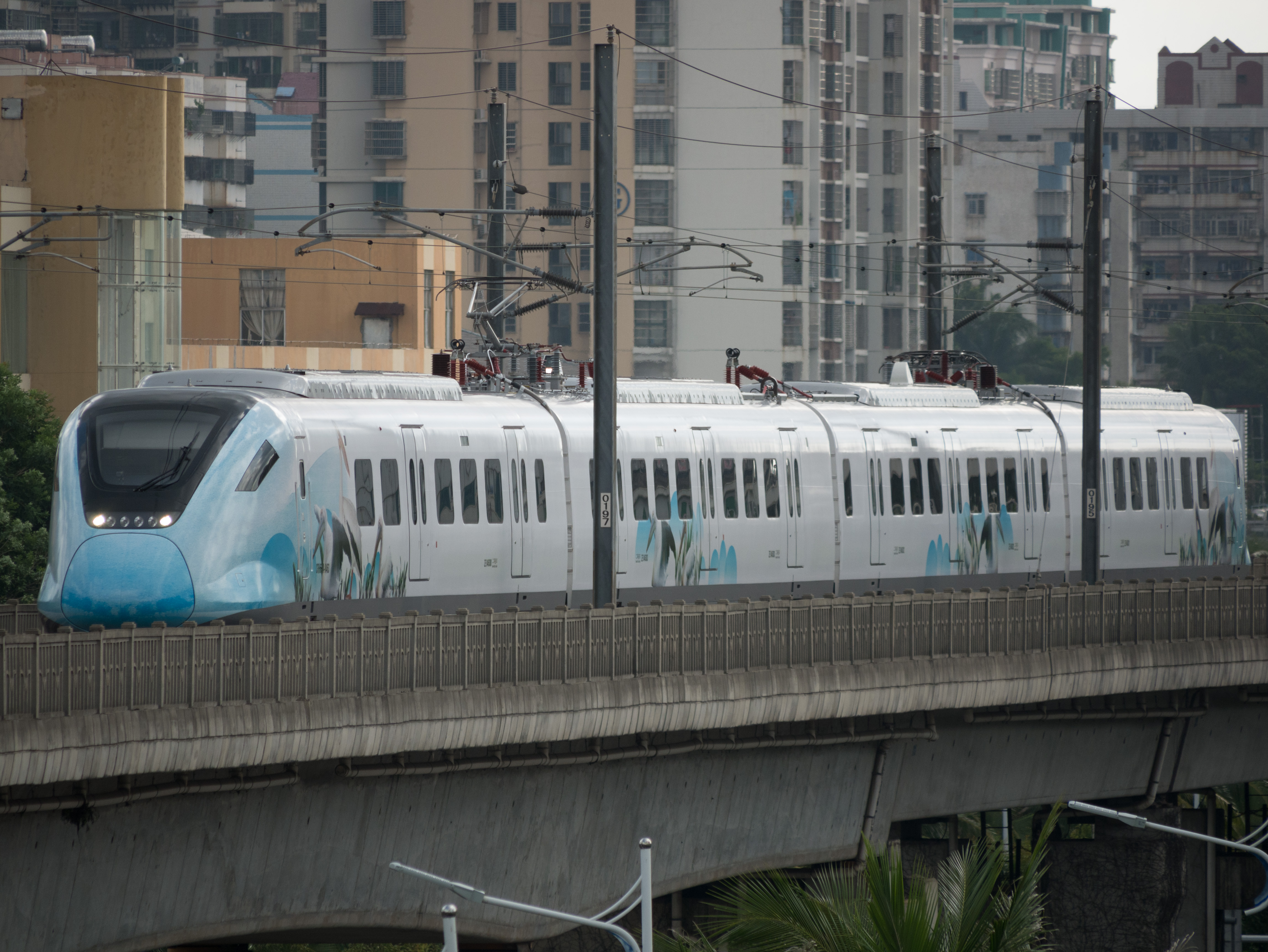
CRH6F-A running on the Eastern Ring HSR.

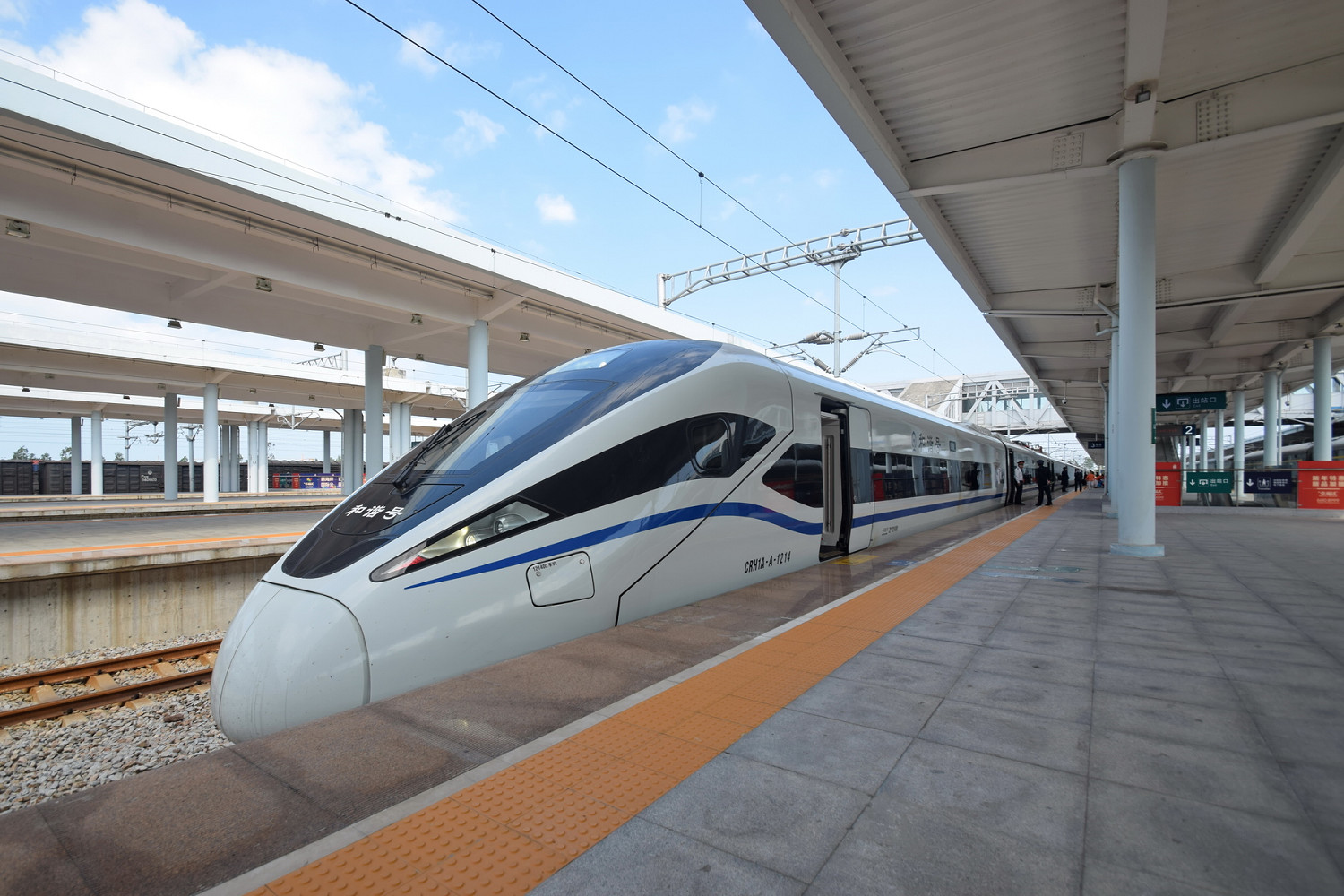
CRH1A-A EMU at Haikou railway station.

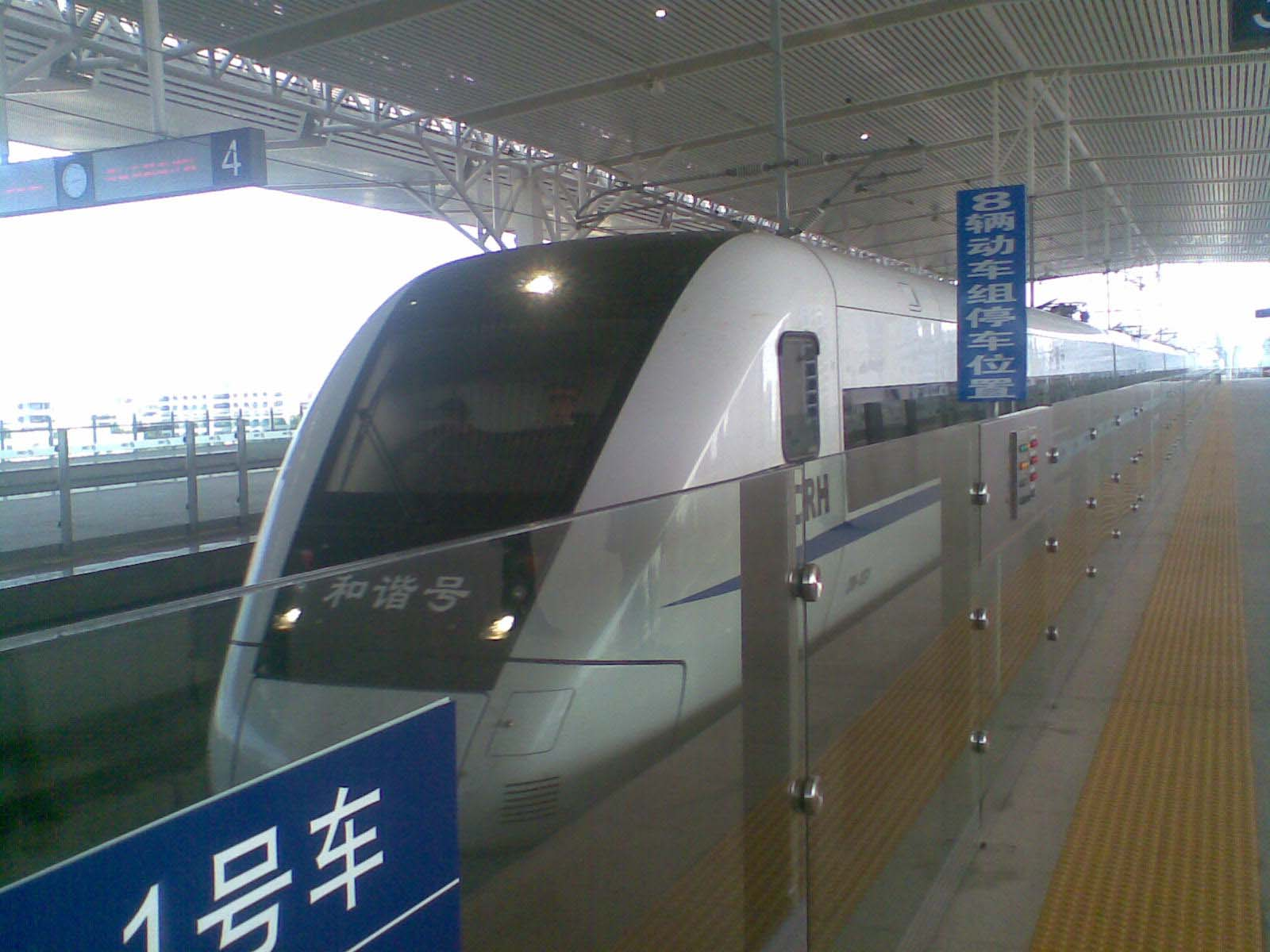
CRH1 train arriving at Haikou East Station.

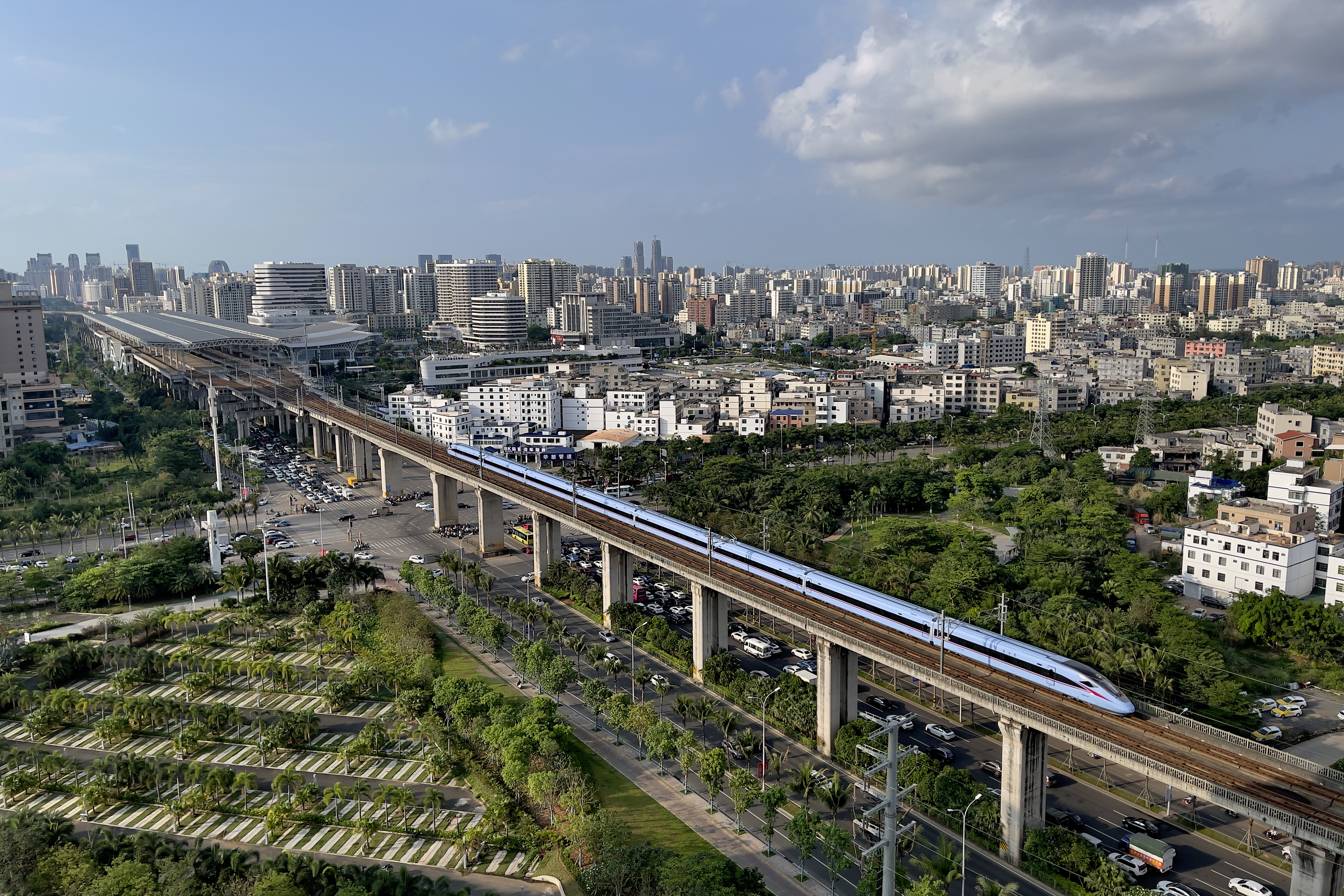
CR300AF aerial view near at Haikou East station.

== Operation ==
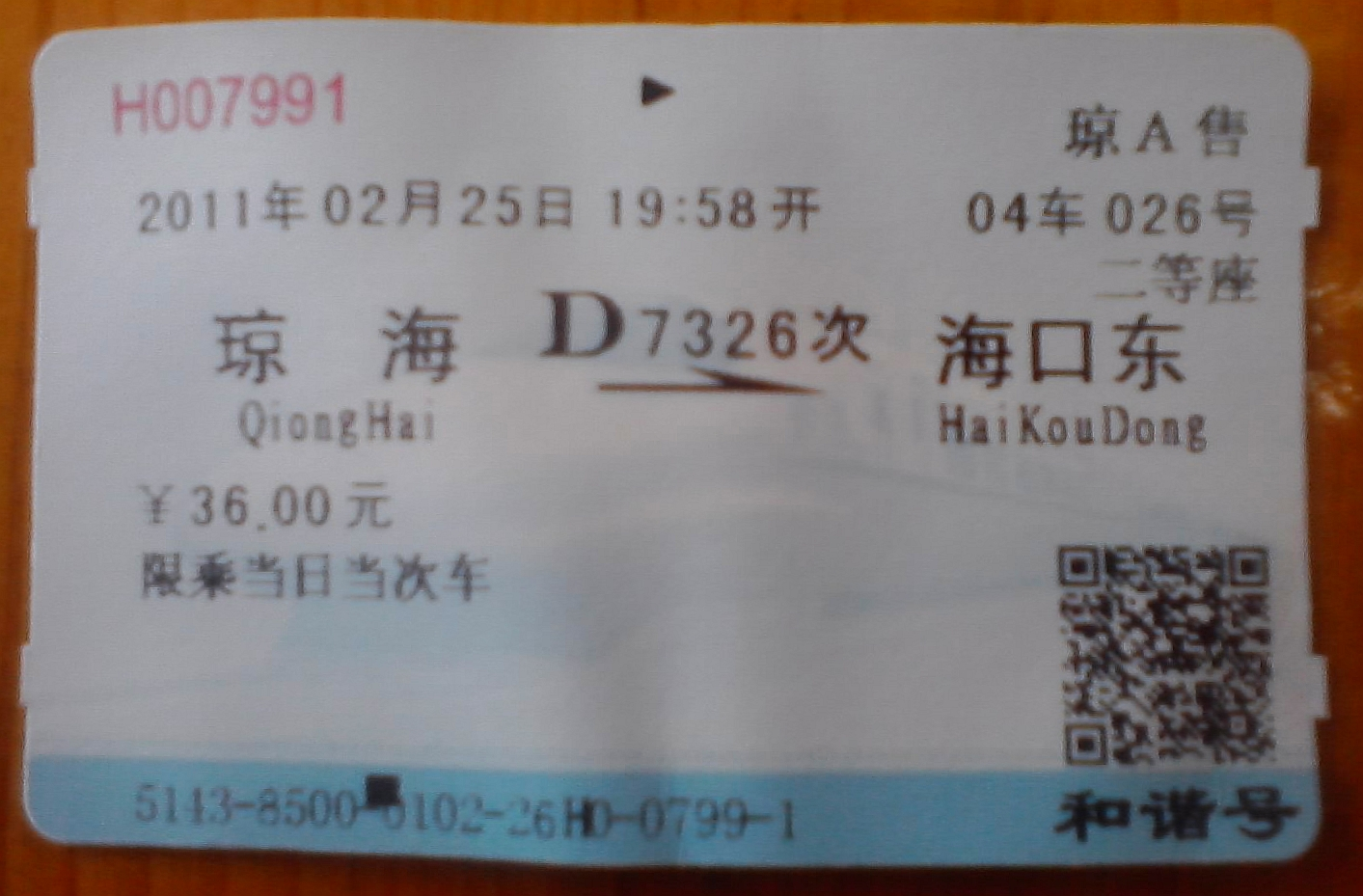
Ticket

The railway runs from the Haikou Railway Station to Sanya Railway Station, although many trains terminate at Haikou East Railway Station. The total length of the route is 308.11 km (191.45 mi), and will contain 10 pairs of trains traveling per day.

The fare for a full journey between Haikou and Sanya is 173 RMB for a first-class seat, and 108 RMB for a second-class seat. Tickets can be purchased up to ten days in advance and are available at station counters or from vending machines.

== Schedule ==
Initially, there were ten trains per day in each direction on the Hainan eastern ring high-speed railway.

Since January 20, 2017, thirty-eight trains run in each direction on the Hainan eastern ring high-speed railway, of which twenty-nine are between Haikou or Haikou East and Sanya; five loop around the island from Sanya to Sanya, and four loop from Haikou East to Haikou East. For intercity service, there are thirteen trains run in each direction, of which seven are between Haikou and Haikou East; and six from Haikou to Meilan.

== Ridership ==
In 2017, the entire Hainan ring high-speed railway (including the eastern and western halves) served 25.39 million passengers, a 3.62 million (16.6%) increase over 2016.

== Stations ==
A total of 21 stations are already built or will be phased in gradually:

- Haikou (海口)
- Changliu (长流)
- Xiuying (秀英)
- Chengxi (城西)
- Haikou East (海口东)
- Meilan (美兰)
- Dongzhaigang (东寨港) ♦
- Wenchang (文昌)
- Fengjiawan (冯家湾) ♦
- Qionghai (琼海)
- Bo'ao (博鳌)
- Hele (和乐)
- Shangen (山根) ♦
- Wanning (万宁)
- Shenzhou (神州)
- Riyuewan (日月湾) ♦
- Lingshui (陵水)
- Gaofeng (高峰) ♦
- Haitangwan (海棠湾) ♦
- Yalongwan (亚龙湾)
- Sanya (三亚)

Note: ♦ denotes Under construction or planned

== See also ==
- List of railways in China
- Transportation in China
- China Railway High-speed
