= Boao Forum for Asia =

Economic cooperation organization

Boao Forum for Asia 博鳌亚洲论坛
- Formation: 2001; 25 years ago
- Type: Nonprofit organization
- Legal status: Forum
- Headquarters: Bo'ao, Hainan, China; Beijing (Secretariat)
- Region served: Asia
- Chairman: (South Korea) Ban Ki-moon
- Secretary General: (China) Zhang Jun
- Website: www.boaoforum.org

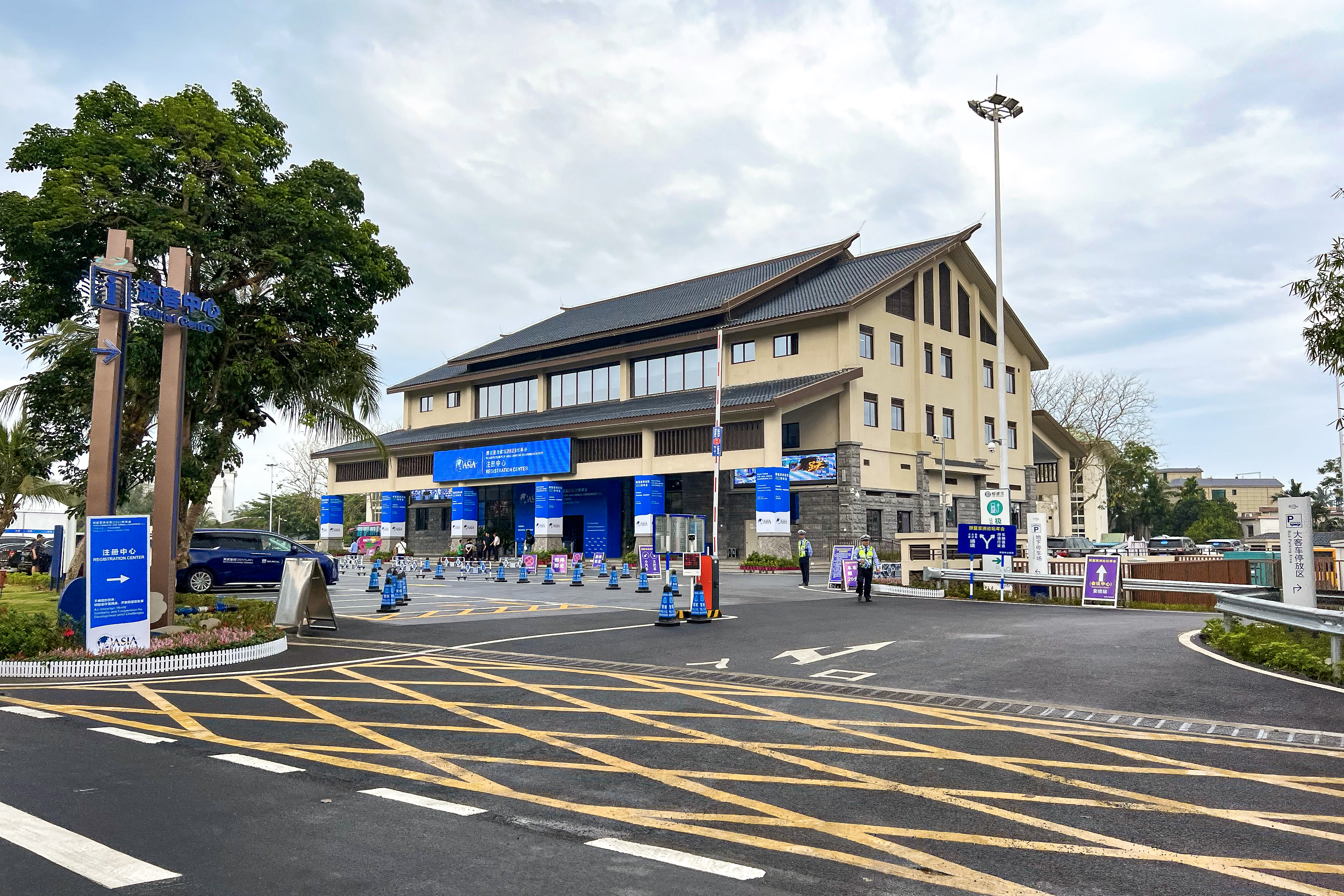
Registration center of the Boao Forum for Asia in 2023

The Boao Forum for Asia (BFA; Chinese: 博鳌亚洲论坛; pinyin: Bó'áo Yàzhōu Lùntán), initiated by 25 Asian countries and Australia (increased to 28 in 2006), is a nonprofit that hosts high-level forums for leaders from government, business and academia in Asia and other continents to share their vision on the most pressing issues in this region and the world at large. Though its fixed address is in Bo'ao, Hainan province, China, its Secretariat is based in Beijing. The forum, sometimes known as the "Asian Davos", takes its name from the town of Boao, located in China's southern Hainan province, which has been the permanent venue for its annual conference since 2002.

== History ==
The Forum is committed to promoting regional economic integration and bringing Asian countries even closer to their development goals. Initiated in 1998 by Fidel V. Ramos, former President of the Philippines, Bob Hawke, former Prime Minister of Australia, and Morihiro Hosokawa, former Prime Minister of Japan, the Boao Forum for Asia was formally inaugurated in February 2001. The founding of the BFA was driven by the People's Republic of China and founded by 26 Asian and Australasian states on 27 February 2001. The organisation held its first meeting from 12 to 13 April 2002.

Discussions at the BFA focus on economics, integration, cooperation, society and the environment. In the past the forum also addressed China's entry into the World Trade Organization, as well as Southeast Asia's economic crisis during the 1990s. The geopolitical strategy 'China's peaceful rise' was a topic of discussion for the forum in 2004. In November 2003, Zheng Bijian first voiced the idea of China's 'peaceful rise' at a BFA plenary session. In addition to its annual meeting, the BFA also sponsors other forums and meetings related to Asian issues.

== Forums ==
=== 2008 ===
The Boao Forum For Asia Annual Conference 2008 was held on 10–13 April 2008. It was attended by heads of government from countries including Australia, Pakistan, Norway and Kazakhstan. It also saw the historic meeting of Taiwan's Republic of China's Vice President-elect Vincent Siew, with then People's Republic of China paramount leader Hu Jintao.

=== 2009 ===
The 2009 forum was held in Boao, Hainan, from 17 to 19 April 2009. The theme was "Asia: Managing Beyond Crisis".

=== 2010 ===
The 2010 forum was held in Boao, Hainan, from 9–11 April 2010. The theme was "Green Recovery: Asia’s Realistic Choice for Sustainable Growth".

=== 2011 ===
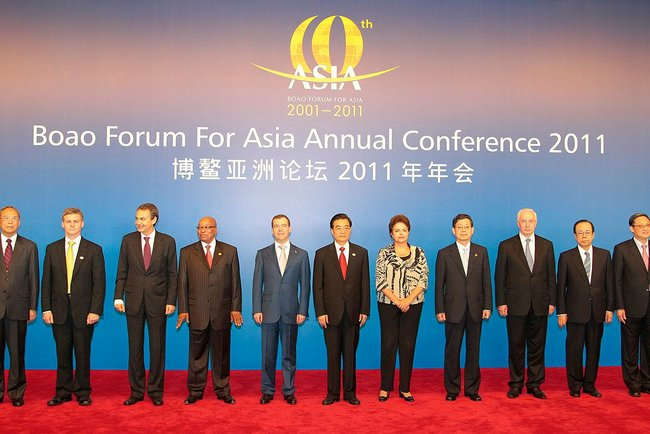
Boao Forum for Asia 2011

Hu Jintao, the President of China and General Secretary of the Chinese Communist Party, attended the 2011 Annual Meeting from April 14 to 16. Other leaders in attendance included Dmitry Anatolyevich Medvedev, the President of Russia, Dilma Rousseff, the President of Brazil, and Jacob Zuma, the President of South Africa. The subject of the meeting was "Inclusive Development: Common Agenda and New Challenges."

The Energy, Resources & Sustainable Development Conference for the organisation was held in Perth, Australia between the 11 and 12 July 2011. The conferences brought together business, industry and political leaders in the region to discuss energy and resource security, development and trade. Australian Foreign Minister Kevin Rudd stated China will invest US 1 trillion dollars abroad and Australia is in a good position to attract capital to develop new mines, infrastructure to service China's insatiable appetite for energy and resources. Rudd also indicated while Chinese capital is essential for Australia's economic future, China needs to do more in relaxing foreign investment rules for Australian companies such as restrictions on types of businesses, equity restrictions and branch or representative office caps.

=== 2013 ===
This year forum was held from 6 to 8 April in Hainan Province. Bill Gates, George Soros and Christine Lagarde attended. General Secretary of the Chinese Communist Party Xi Jinping delivered the keynote address. This year focus was on "Restructuring".

=== 2014 ===
The 2014 forum was held in Hainan, from 8–11 April 2014, with the official opening address from Chinese premier Li Keqiang on 10 April. The theme of the forum was "Asia's New Future: Identifying New Growth Drivers".

Indian business tycoon Ratan Tata was appointed as a member of the Board of Boao Forum. The post is a rare distinction for an Indian in the Chinese government-backed influential body.

=== 2015 ===
Leaders or deputies from 16 countries, including Armenia, Australia, Austria, China, Indonesia, Kazakhstan, Malaysia, Nepal, the Netherlands, Qatar, Russia, Sri Lanka, Sweden, Thailand, Uganda and Zambia, attended the forum held from 26 to 29 March. The theme of this year forum is "community of shared destiny".

=== 2016 ===
The 2016 forum was held in Hainan, from 22 to 25 March 2016. Participants at the annual conference focused on Asia's New future: New Dynamics, New Vision and took part in panel discussions. Chinese Premier Li Keqiang made the keynote speech at the opening of the annual conference.

=== 2017 ===
The 2017 forum was held from 23 to 26 March 2017. Keynote speech was made by Chinese Vice Premier Zhang Gaoli at the opening plenary of the Boao Forum for Asia Annual Conference 2017. The theme for the conference was "Globalization and Free Trade: The Asian Perspectives".

=== 2018 ===
The Boao Forum for Asia 2018 was held between 8 and 11 April at Hainan Province, China. The theme of this year forum was "An Open and Innovative Asia for a World of Greater Prosperity". Xi Jinping gave the opening speech at the opening ceremony. He said China will open up market including lowering tariffs on imported autos amid increasing trade tensions between US and China.

=== 2019 ===
The 2019 forum was held in Hainan, from 26 to 29 March 2019. Chinese Premier Li Keqiang made the keynote speech at the opening of the annual conference.

=== 2020 ===
The 2020 Forum was cancelled due to COVID-19.

=== 2021 ===
Opening of the Boao Forum for Asia Annual Conference 2021

In 2020, China joined the G20-led Debt Service Suspension Initiative, through which official bilateral creditors suspended debt repayments of 73 of the poorest debtor countries. On April 20, Xi Jinping delivered a keynote speech and attended the opening ceremony of the Boao Forum for Asia (BFA) 2021 Annual Conference via video.

At the 2021 Boao Forum, Export-Import Bank of China president Hu Xiaolin stated that the interest of both debtors and creditors should be considered in debt suspension. Hu stated, "Debt suspension is neither debt reduction nor debt cancellation. It is an adjustment made to tackle difficulties at specific times" and that outright cancellation weakens financial stability.

Regarding the Belt and Road Initiative, Chinese financial regulators and bankers discussed the need for sustaining BRI investments in the post-pandemic era.

=== 2022 ===
At the 2022 Forum, Xi announced China's Global Security Initiative. The Global Security Initiative identifies six commitments: (1) common, comprehensive, cooperative, and sustainable security; (2) respect for sovereignty and territorial integrity of all countries; (3) abiding by the purpose and principles of the UN Charter; (4) peacefully resolving disputes between countries through dialogue; (5) taking the security concerns of all countries seriously; and (6) maintaining security in both traditional and non-traditional fields. The principles outlined by the Global Security Initiative are long-standing elements of China's security policy and little operational detail was provided.

=== 2023 ===
The 2023 annual meeting was held in Boao, Hainan from March 28 to 31. This annual meeting has completely resumed offline, and participants are not required to wear masks. Singapore Prime Minister Lee Hsien Loong, Malaysian Prime Minister Anwar, Spanish Prime Minister Pedro Sanchez and other international dignitaries attended the meeting, and also the Chinese Premier Li Qiang delivered a speech at the opening ceremony.

=== 2024 ===
The 2024 Annual Conference was held from March 26 to 29 in Boao, Hainan. Zhao Leji, Chairman of the Standing Committee of the National People's Congress of China, attended the opening ceremony and delivered a keynote speech.

=== 2025 ===
The 2025 Annual Conference was held in Boao, Hainan, from March 25 to 28, with the theme of "Shaping Asia's Future in a Changing World".

== See also ==
- World Economic Forum
