= Wanquan, Hubei =

Wanquan 万全镇
- Town
- Location in Hubei
- Coordinates (Wanquan town government): 30°01′36″N 113°23′25″E
- Country: People's Republic of China
- Province: Hubei
- Prefecture-level city: Jingzhou
- County-level city: Honghu

Area
  - Total: 164.6 km^{2} (63.6 sq mi)

Population (2010)
  - Total: 63,023
- Time zone: UTC+8 (China Standard Time)

Wanquan (simplified Chinese: 万全镇; traditional Chinese: 萬全鎮; pinyin: Wànquán Zhèn) is a town under the administration of the county-level city of Honghu, in the south of Hubei province, China. It is located to the north of both downtown Honghu and Lake Hong.

== Administrative divisions ==
Two communities:

- Wanquan (万全居委会)
- Yongfeng (永丰居委会)

Twenty-six villages:

- Hongxinghe (红星河村), Hongshan (洪善村), Hezui (河嘴村), Gaohu (高湖村), Zhinan (指南村), Wanquan (万全村), Wandian (万电村), Huangsi (黄丝村), Wangmiao (汪庙村), Yongfeng (永丰村), Laogou (老沟村), Shidang (石垱村), Hongsanqiao (红三桥村), Zhengdaohu (郑道湖村), Hedian (何电村), Huagu (花古村), Zhaobagou (赵八沟村), Zhongling (中岭村), Ma'an (马鞍村), Zhangdang (张当村), Shuanghong (双红村), Xiaohe (小河村), Nanbeiling (南北岭村), Xujiatan (徐家潭村), Dongyuemiao (东岳庙村), and Jianjiakou (简家口村)

One fishery:

- Wanquan (万全渔场)
