= Hainan =

Province of China

Hainan 海南
- Province

Name transcription(s)
  - Chinese: 海南省 (Hǎinán shěng)
  - Hainanese: Hái-nâm-séng
  - Cantonese Jyutping: hoi2 naam4 saang2
  - Abbreviation: 瓊 (Qióng / Khêng / king4)
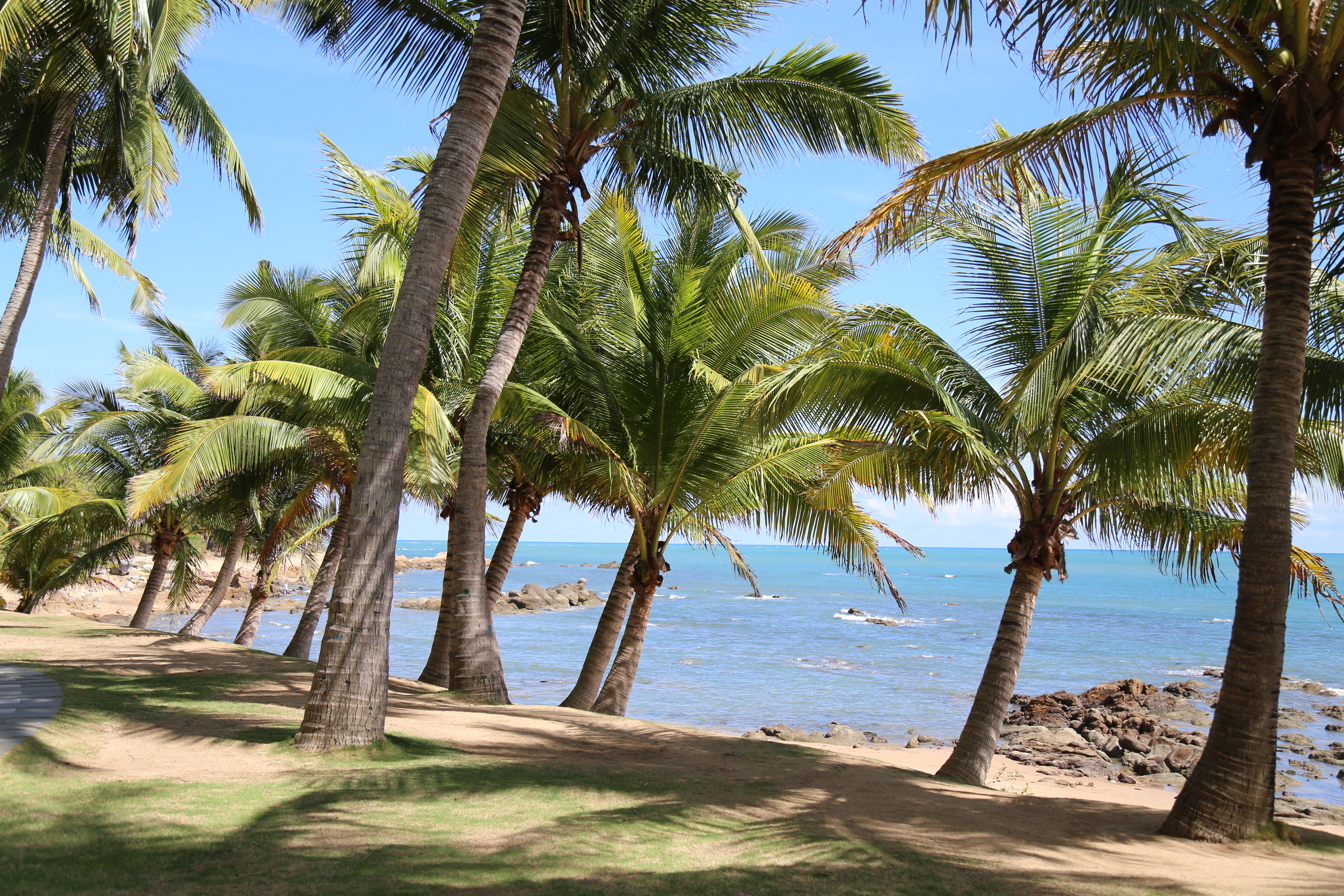
- Sanya Nanshan Dongtian Park

- Location of Hainan within China
- Coordinates: 19°12′N 109°42′E
- Country: China
- Guangnan West Circuit: 988
- Hainan Special Administrative District: April 1949
- Incorporation into the PRC: 1 May 1950
- Separation from Guangdong: 26 April 1988
- Capital and largest city: Haikou
- Divisions: 4 prefectures, 25 counties, 218 townships

Government
  - Type: Province
  - Body: Hainan Provincial People's Congress
  - Party Secretary: Feng Fei
  - Congress Chairman: Feng Fei
  - Governor: Liu Xiaoming
  - CPPCC Chairman: Li Rongcan
  - National People's Congress Representation: 26 deputies

Area
  - Total: 35,191 km^{2} (13,587 sq mi)
  - Rank: 28th
- Highest elevation (Wuzhi Mountain): 1,840 m (6,040 ft)

Population (2020)
  - Total: 10,081,232
  - Rank: 28th
  - Density: 286.47/km^{2} (741.96/sq mi)
  - Rank: 17th

Demographics
  - Ethnic composition: Han: 82.6%; Li: 15.84%; Miao: 0.82%; Zhuang: 0.67%
  - Languages and dialects: Standard Chinese, Hainanese, Yue, Lingao, Hakka, Hlai, Miao, Tsat

GDP (2023)
  - Total: CN¥755 billion (28th; US$107 billion)
  - Per capita: CN¥72,958 (17th; US$10,353
- ISO 3166 code: CN-HI
- HDI (2023): 0.790 (15th) – high
- Website: en.hainan.gov.cn

Hainan Island
Native name: 海南岛
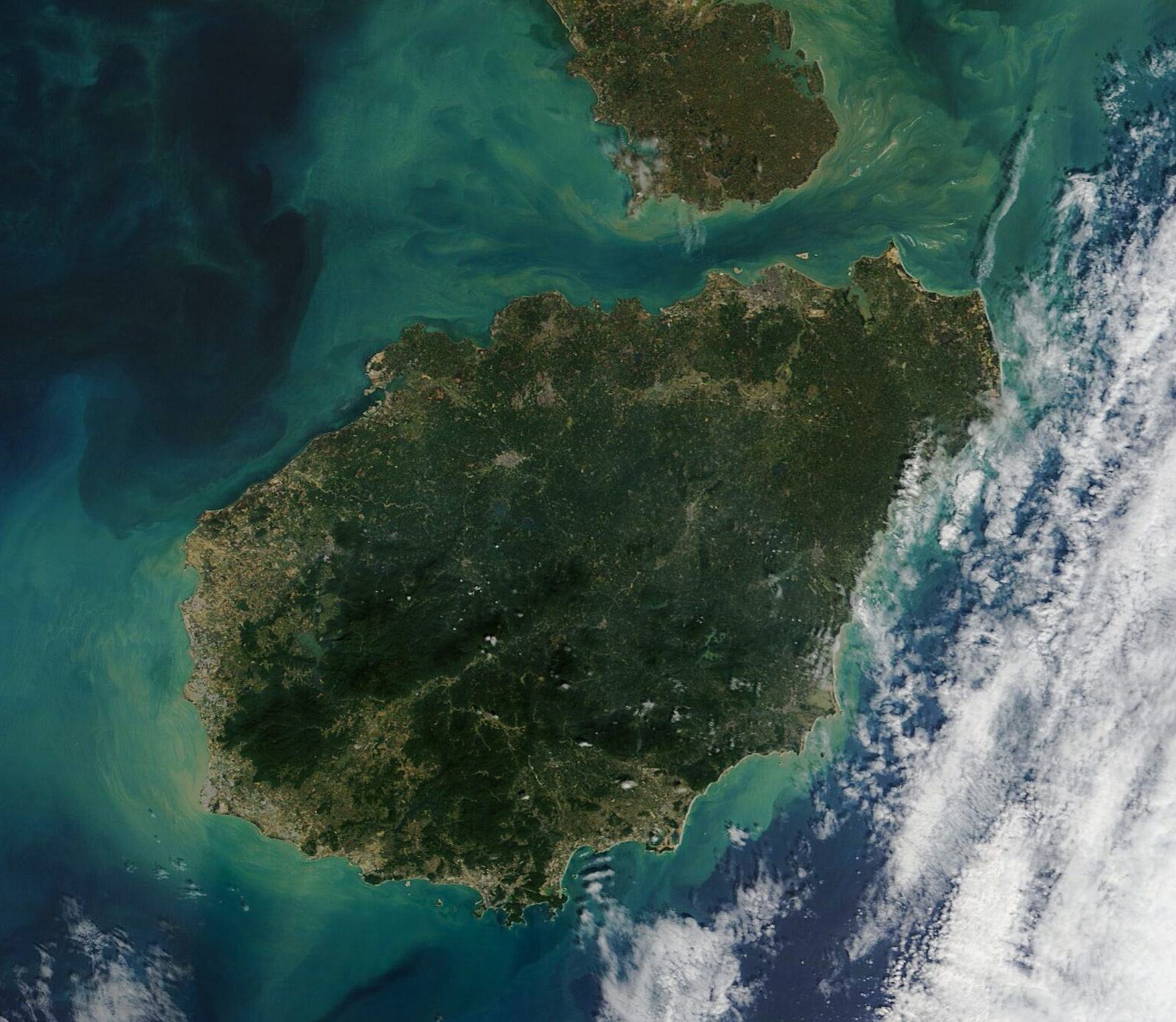
- Interactive map of Hainan Island

Geography
- Location: East Asia
- Type: Island
- Area: 33,210 km^{2} (12,820 sq mi)
- Area rank: 42nd
- Length: 156 km (96.9 mi)
- Width: 170 km (106 mi)
- Highest elevation: 1,840 m (6040 ft)
- Highest point: Wuzhi Mountain

Administration
- China
- Province: Hainan
- Largest settlement: Haikou (pop. 2,873,358)

Demographics
- Population: c. 8,180,000
- Ethnic groups: Han, Li, Miao, Zhuang, Utsul

Hainan
- "Hainan" in Chinese characters
- Chinese: 海南
- Hanyu Pinyin: Hǎinán
- Literal meaning: "South of the sea"
Transcriptions
Standard Mandarin
- Hanyu Pinyin: Hǎinán
- Bopomofo: ㄏㄞˇㄋㄢˊ
- Wade–Giles: Hai^{3}-nan^{2}
- Tongyong Pinyin: Hǎinán
- IPA: [xàɪ.nǎn]
Hakka
- Pha̍k-fa-sṳ: Hói-nàm
Yue: Cantonese
- Yale Romanization: Hói nàahm
- Jyutping: Hoi2 naam4
- IPA: [hɔj˧˥ nam˩]
Southern Min
- Hokkien POJ: Hái-lâm
- Hainanese Romanization: Hái-nâm
Eastern Min
- Fuzhou BUC: Hāi-nàng

Former name
- Chinese: 珠崖
- Hanyu Pinyin: Zhūyá
- Literal meaning: "Pearl cliffs"
Transcriptions
Standard Mandarin
- Hanyu Pinyin: Zhūyá
- Bopomofo: ㄓㄨ ㄧㄚˊ
- Wade–Giles: Chu^{1}-ya^{2}
- Tongyong Pinyin: Jhuyá
- IPA: [ʈʂú.jǎ]
Yue: Cantonese
- Yale Romanization: Jyū ngàaih
- Jyutping: zyu1 ngaai4
- IPA: [tsy˥ ŋaj˩]

Second former name
- Traditional Chinese: 瓊崖
- Simplified Chinese: 琼崖
- Hanyu Pinyin: Qióngyá
- Literal meaning: "Jade cliffs"
Transcriptions
Standard Mandarin
- Hanyu Pinyin: Qióngyá
- Bopomofo: ㄑㄩㄥˊ ㄧㄚˊ
- Wade–Giles: Ch'iung^{2}-ya^{2}
- Tongyong Pinyin: Cyóngyá
- IPA: [tɕʰjʊ̌ŋ.jǎ]
Yue: Cantonese
- Yale Romanization: Kìhng ngàaih
- Jyutping: king4 ngaai4
- IPA: [kʰɪŋ˩ ŋaj˩]

Third former name
- Traditional Chinese: 瓊州
- Simplified Chinese: 琼州
- Hanyu Pinyin: Qióngzhōu
- Literal meaning: "Jade prefecture"
Transcriptions
Standard Mandarin
- Hanyu Pinyin: Qióngzhōu
- Bopomofo: ㄑㄩㄥˊ ㄓㄡ
- Wade–Giles: Ch'iung^{2}-chou^{1}
- Tongyong Pinyin: Cyóngjhou
- IPA: [tɕʰjʊ̌ŋ.ʈʂóʊ]
Yue: Cantonese
- Yale Romanization: Kìhng jāu
- Jyutping: King4 zau1
- IPA: [kʰɪŋ˩ tsɐw˥]

Hainan (Note: UK: /haɪˈnæn/, US: /-ˈnɑːn/; Chinese: 海南) is an island and the southernmost province of China, consisting of the eponymous Hainan Island and various smaller islands in the South China Sea under the province's administration. Its name literally means "South of the Sea".

The province has a land area of 33,920 square kilometers (13,100 sq mi), of which Hainan Island is 32,900 square kilometers (12,700 mi^{2}) and the rest is over 200 islands scattered across three archipelagos: Zhongsha, Xisha and Nansha. It was part of Guangdong from 1950 to 1988. After 1988, Hainan was made a province of its own. As part of the reform and opening up program, it was designated as a special economic zone by Deng Xiaoping.

The Han population, who compose a majority of the population at 82%, speak a wide variety of languages including Be, Hainam Min, Standard Chinese, Yue Chinese, Cantonese, Hakka Chinese, etc. Indigenous peoples such as the Hlai, a Kra–Dai-speaking ethnic group, are native to the island and compose 15% of the population. Their native languages include the Hlai languages. The Hlai are recognized by the Chinese government as one of the country's 56 ethnic groups. Speakers of Be, despite speaking a Kra-Dai language, are reckoned officially as ethnically Han Chinese. Hainan is also home to the Jiamao language, of disputed provenance.

There are ten major cities and ten counties in Hainan Province. The capital of the province is Haikou, on the northern coast of Hainan Island, while Sanya is a well-known tourist destination on the southern coast. The other major cities are Wenchang, Sansha, Qionghai, Wanning, Wuzhishan, Dongfang and Danzhou. According to China's territorial claims, several disputed territories in the South China Sea, including the Spratly Islands (Nansha) and Paracel Islands (Xisha), are administered under Sansha city of the province. While the Paracels are fully under China's control, many of the Spratly Islands are controlled by other countries, such as Vietnam and the Philippines.

In 2020, a large-scale plan was announced by the Chinese government to transform the entire island province into the Hainan Free Trade Port, with the aim of turning it into the largest free-trade port in the world by 2035. The plan involves building a hub for offshore financing and duty-free shopping, as well as using lower taxes and reduced visa requirements to help draw in foreign businesses and tourists. Moreover, all goods sold from Hainan to other parts of China would be treated as imports from 2025 onward. The Hainan Free Trade Port launched an island-wide independent customs operations in 2025.

== Names ==
The provincial name derives from its major island, Hainan, in Hainanese "Hai Nam", which is named after its position south of the Qiongzhou Strait. (To the north of the strait, the Leizhou Peninsula in Guangdong is also known as Haibei/Hai Bac or "North of the Sea".) Former names for Hainan Island include Zhuya, Qiongya, and Qiongzhou. The latter two gave rise to the provincial abbreviation 瓊 (Qióng/Kheng).

During the 17th and 18th centuries, explorers referred to the island as "Aynam", which remains the pronunciation of its name in the local Hainanese dialect.

== History ==
19th century map of Hainan

=== Prehistoric era ===
According to some scholars, Hainan was originally attached to the Northeastern part of what is now Vietnam; however, the island was formed after it physically broke away from Vietnam due to a volcanic eruption and drifted southeast near China after the Mesozoic, millions of years ago.

The Baiyue people are among the earliest Kra-Dai residents to arrive on Hainan island. They are believed to have settled there at least two to six thousand years ago, and carry genetic markers from ancient people who reached the island between 7000–27,000 years ago.

=== Imperial Era ===
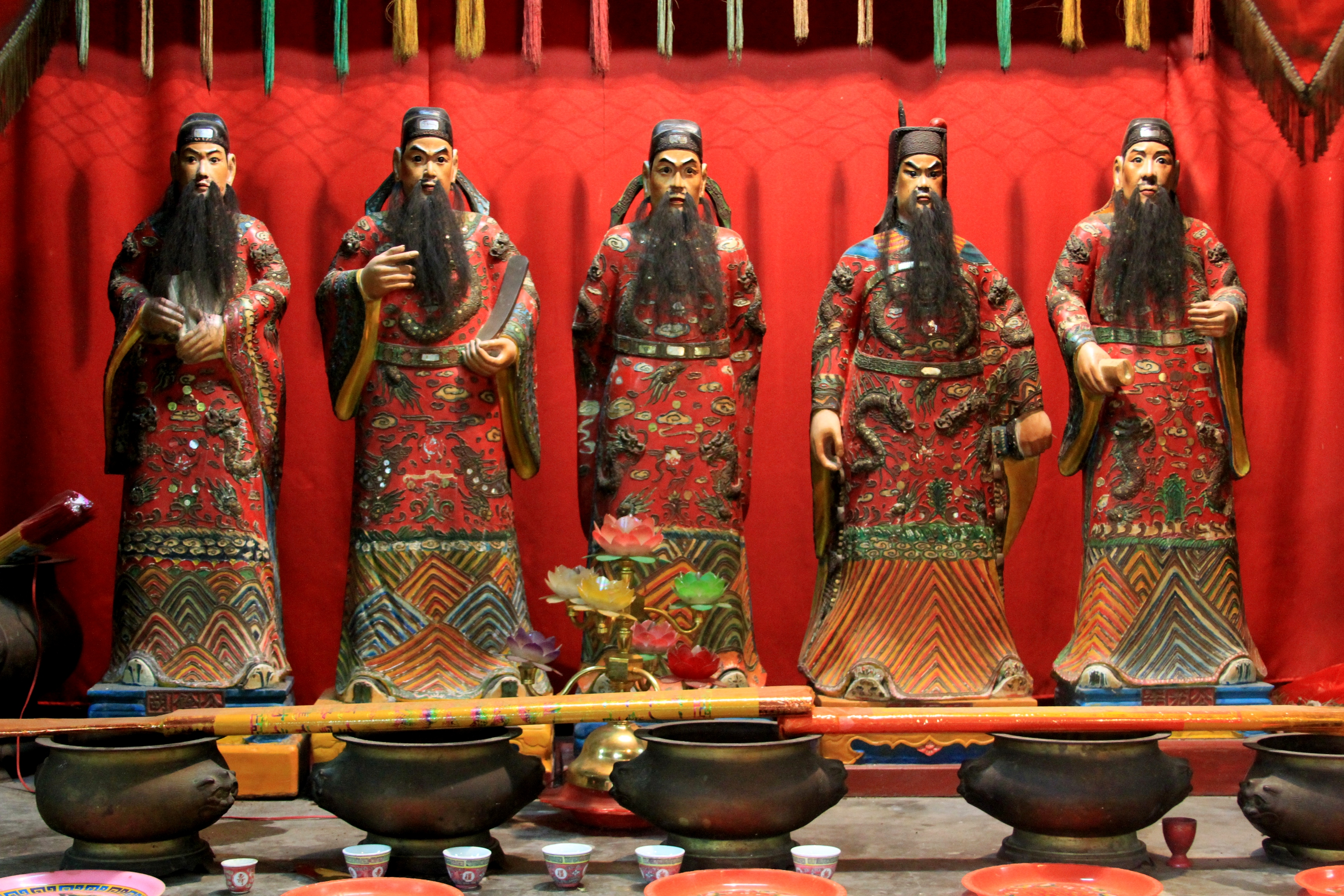
Depiction of the five lords, or five famous exiles to Hainan island

Hainan Island was recorded by Chinese officials in 110 BC, when the Western Han dynasty established a military garrison there following the arrival of General Lu Bode. The process of sinicization in Hainan was driven by the conjunction of Han territorial expansion and the arrival of Han Chinese military and administrative personnel who settled on the island. Over the course of many centuries, dynastic Chinese ruling authorities exiled individuals condemned by the imperial courts as criminals or political dissidents to Hainan island and northern Vietnam. These regions were typically governed under the jurisdiction of Guangdong province. Banished people were subjected to harsh labor in the tropical climate as a form of punishment.

One of the most famous exiled individuals was Su Shi, a well-known intellectual, poet, and politician of the Song era, who offended many of his colleagues and superiors in the royal court. Shi wrote extensively about his exiled experiences on the island during the 11th century AD. After the 11th century AD, large numbers of Han Chinese people from Fujian and Guangdong began migrating to the Leizhou peninsula and Hainan island to settle down their roots by seeking greener pastures on new land to establish themselves. The Hlai (Li people), who were among the Baiyue tribes in southern China, remained in the mountainous regions of the southern portion of the island. Hainan was placed under the administration of Guangdong by the ruling Ming dynasty.

=== Republic of China ===
Hainan was historically part of Guangdong Province and was organized as the Qiongya Circuit (瓊崖道) following the 1912 establishment of the Republic of China (ROC). In 1920, Sun Yat-sen proposed establishing the Qiongya Special District (瓊崖特別區) for the island. Following the end of World War II, the ROC Executive Yuan approved the separation of Hainan from Guangdong in 1947, and formally established the Hainan Special Administrative District (海南特別行政區) in 1949 with one municipality (Haikou), 16 counties, and the South China Sea Islands.

During the 1920s and 30s, Hainan was a hotbed of banditry, many opposition politicians were hanged, therefore opposition politicians went into hiding. The Japanese attacked the island in 1939 during the Second Sino-Japanese War. The Communists and the indigenous Hlai people fought a vigorous guerrilla campaign against the Japanese, who were only able to occupy some Hainan territories; but in retaliation the Japanese launched numerous massacres against Hlai villages and Muslim Utsul villages. Feng Baiju led the Hainan Independent Column of fighters throughout the 1930s and 1940s. After the Japanese surrender in 1945, the Kuomintang reestablished control. Hainan was one of the last areas to eventually come under the administration of the People's Republic, having been under the control of ROC forces until March 1950. The People's Republic attacked Hainan on 10 April 1950 and attained complete control on 1 May. However, Pratas Island remained under Hainan until the ROC government transferred the administration of Pratas to Kaohsiung Municipality on 13 April 1996.

The ROC reestablished control over the island after the Second World War. With the resumption of the Chinese Civil War, the ROC was unable to suppress the islands' Communist movement, but the movement was also too weak to take control of the island. By 1950, the Communists controlled most of mainland China, founded the People's Republic of China (PRC), and were seeking to conquer the islands along the coast. The PRC invaded on 16 April 1950 and was in control of the island by 1 May.

=== People's Republic of China ===
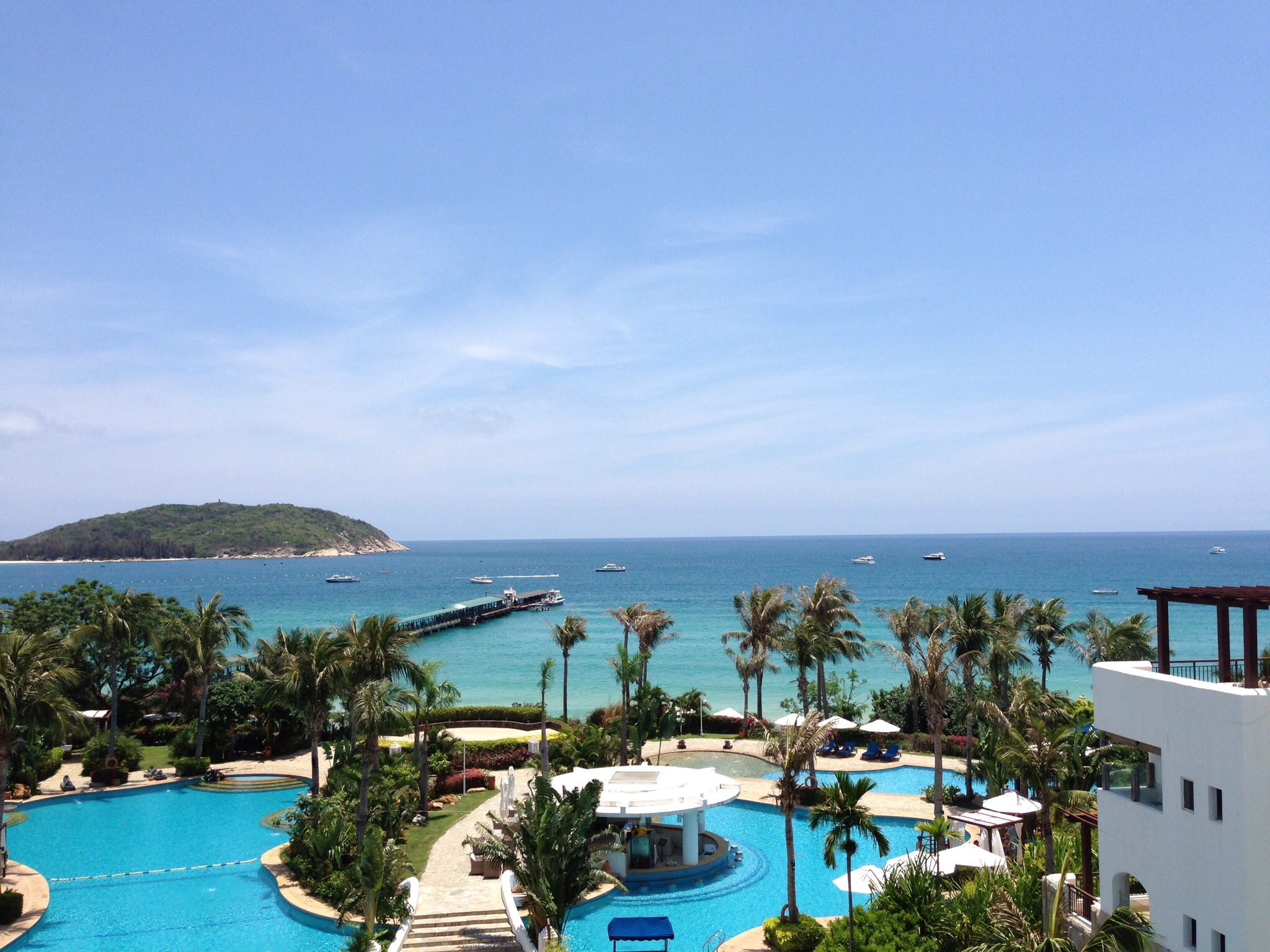
A beachside resort in Sanya, the second largest city in Hainan

On 1 May 1950, under the People's Republic of China, the Hainan Special Administrative Region became an Administrative Region Office (海南行政区公署), a branch of the Guangdong provincial government. During the mid-1980s, when Hainan Island was still part of Guangdong Province, a fourteen-month episode of marketing zeal by Hainan Special District Administrator Lei Yu put Hainan's pursuit of provincial status under a cloud. It involved the duty-free imports from Hong Kong of 90,000 Japanese-made cars and trucks at a cost of ¥ 4.5 billion (US$1.5 billion), and exporting them – with the help of local naval units – to the mainland, making 150% profits. By comparison, only 10,000 vehicles were imported into Hainan since 1950. In addition, it involved further consignments of 2.9 million TV sets, 252,000 videocassette recorders & 122,000 motorcycles. The money was taken from the 1983 central government funds destined for the construction of the island's transportation infrastructure (roads, railways, airports, harbors) over the next ten years.

On 1 October 1984, it became the Hainan Administrative Region (海南行政区), with its own People's Government. In 1988, when the island was made a separate province, it was designated a Special Economic Zone in an effort to increase investment.

The central government funds were deemed insufficient by the Hainan authorities for the construction of the island's other infrastructure (e.g. water works, power stations, telecommunications) and had taken a very liberal interpretation of the economic and trade regulations for Hainan and thirteen coastal cities; the regulations did not mention on prohibiting the re-selling of second-hand goods. Some of the proceeds, from unsold units, were later retrieved by the central government to re-finance the special district.

In June 2020, China announced a master plan for Hainan Free Trade Port system. Announced by state-owned media Xinhua News Agency, Hainan will "basically establish a free trade port system by 2025 and become more mature by 2035." South China Morning Post described such an initiative as an effort of PRC to "replace Hong Kong as the trading entrepôt" while Cheng Shi of ICBC International has refused to accept such a claim. Additionally, experts have raised concerns about the question of compliance of global trading practices particularly for this project.

In July 2025, Chinese officials announced that the Hainan Free Trade Port will launch island-wide independent customs operations on December 18, 2025.

== Geography ==
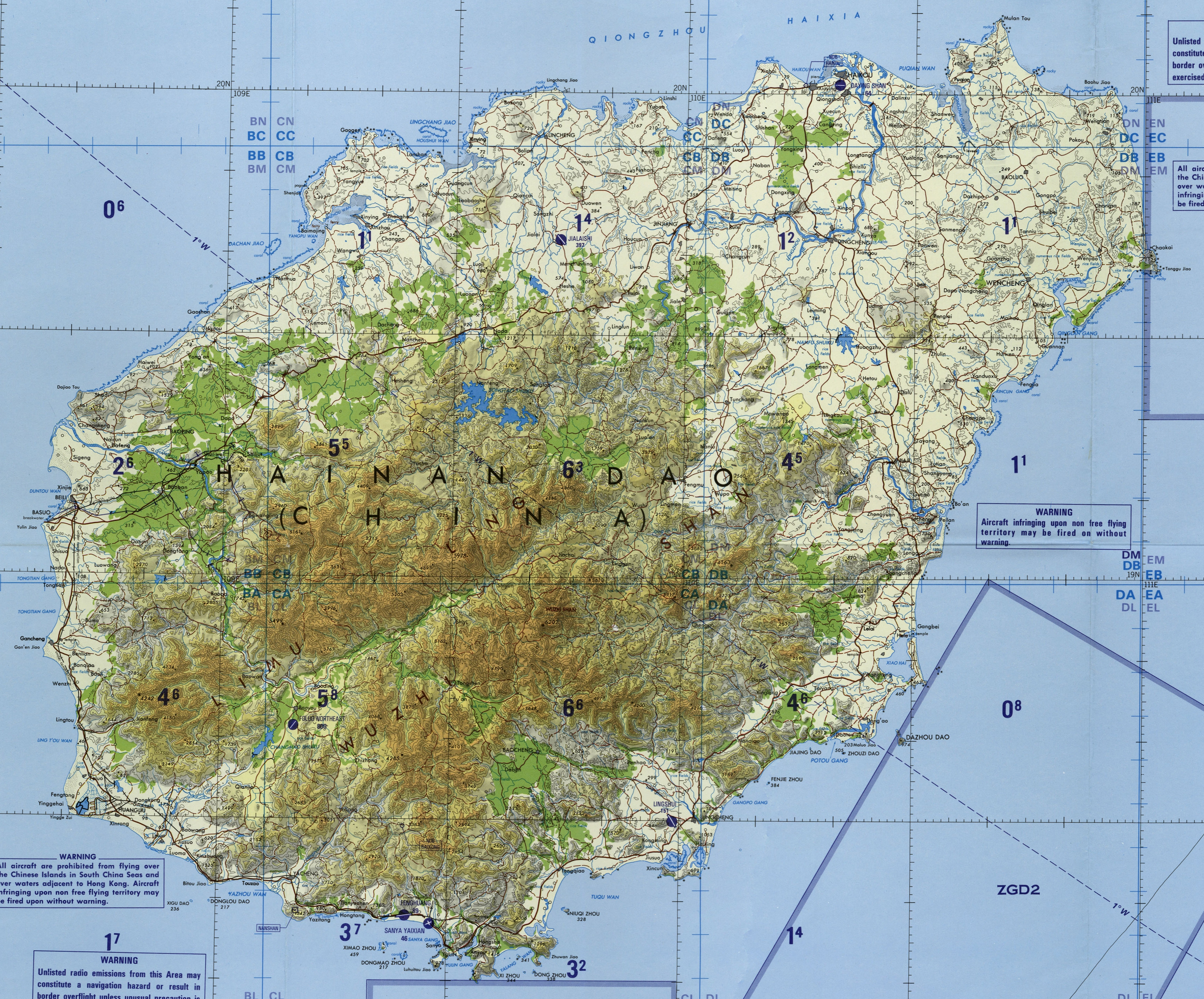
Topographic map of Hainan Island

Hainan, separated by the 20 km (12 mi) wide Qiongzhou Strait from the Leizhou Peninsula of Guangdong, is the 42nd largest island in the world. The area of Hainan Island (32,900 km^{2} (12,700 mi^{2}), 97% of the province) is slightly smaller than that of Taiwan Island. To the west of Hainan Island is the Gulf of Tonkin. Wuzhi Mountain is the highest mountain on the island at 1,840 m (6,040 ft).

Hainan Island measures 288 km (179 mi) long and 180 km (110 mi) wide.

The northern half of Hainan is covered with the ancient Hainan Volcanic Field. Beneath the topsoil is volcanic rock while the topsoil itself contains small pieces of this vesicular rock.

Wetland covers 320,000 hectares, 78,000 hectares of which were created artificially. Most of this is located in the eastern and northern part of Hainan.

=== Rivers and lakes ===
Most of the rivers in Hainan originate in the central area of the island and flow radially in different directions. The Nandu River in the northern part of the island is 314 km (195 mi) long, and its tributary, the Xinwu River, is 109 km (68 mi) long. Other major rivers include the Wanquan River at 162 km (101 mi)-long in the east, Changhua River in the west, and the Sanya and Taiyang Rivers in the south. Evaporation during the dry season around the coastal areas greatly reduces the flow of the rivers.

There are very few natural lakes in Hainan. However, there are numerous reservoirs, the largest of which is the Songtao Reservoir in the central-north area.

=== Islands ===
==== Nearby islands ====
Several small islands exist around the coast of Hainan Island:

- Dazhou Island is located about 5 km (3.1 mi) off the coast of Wanning
- Haidian Island, on the north coast, is part of Haikou City
- Nanwan Monkey Island, is actuality a peninsula
- Phoenix Island is an artificial resort island currently under construction in Sanya Bay.
- Wuzhizhou Island is located within Haitang Bay
- Xinbu Island is located directly to the east of Haidian Island

Due to their close proximity to the main island, the flora, fauna, and the climate are very similar.

==== Disputed islands ====
Maritime claims of South China Sea

Location of the major islands in Sansha
Legend： Black：Sansha (Pref. seat) Yongxing Pink：Huangyan Green：Yongshu Blue：Meiji Purple：Zhubi Orange：Huayang Yellow：Nanxun Red：Chiguo Brown：Dongmen

A number of small islands, which are located hundreds of kilometers to the south, are claimed and administered by Sansha as part of Hainan Province. Sovereignty of these islands is however disputed. These islands include:

- Paracel Islands Xisha Islands – "The West-sands" – claimed by Vietnam, the PRC and the Republic of China (Taiwan, ROC)
  - Money Island, Paracel Islands
  - Rocky Island, South China Sea
  - Tree Island, South China Sea
  - Triton Island
  - Woody Island, South China Sea
- Zhongsha Islands – "The Middle-sands"
- Spratly Islands – Nansha Islands – "The South-sands" are subject to claims by Vietnam, the PRC, ROC, Malaysia, the Philippines, and Brunei.
  - Spratly Island
  - Flat Island (Spratly)
  - Taiping Island
  - James Shoal (southernmost point)
  - Loaita Island
  - Namyit Island
  - Nanshan Island
  - Sin Cowe Island
  - Thitu Island
  - West York Island

=== Environment ===
Compared to most of mainland China, the air quality of Hainan is significantly better since it is not affected by factory pollution, which has adversely affected the air on the mainland. Throughout 2012, Hainan had the highest air quality in the country for 351 days.

The provincial government's environmental protection campaign has taken action against a number of industrial plants. During 2012, several outdated manufacturing facilities had their business licenses revoked, and 175 cases related to illegal sewage discharge were handled.

Total sulfur dioxide emissions for the province were 34,000 tons in 2012, a 3 percent year-on-year reduction. In 2011, smog emissions were reduced 6.3 percent to 15,000 tons.

Protected areas include the Yinggeling-Limushan and Wuzhishan-Diaoluoshan nature reserves.

=== Climate ===
Hainan Island

Climate chart (precipitation, max. and min. temperature)
J	F	M	A	M	J	J	A	S	O	N	D
22 24 17	25 25 18	39 28 20	91 31 23	187 33 25	193 33 26	252 33 25	297 32 25	308 31 24	279 29 23	91 27 21	48 24 18
- █ Average max. and min. temperatures in °C
- █ Precipitation totals in mm
Imperial conversion
J	F	M	A	M	J	J	A	S	O	N	D
0.9 75 63	1 77 64	1.5 82 68	3.6 88 73	7.4 91 77	7.6 91 79	9.9 91 77	12 90 77	12 88 75	11 84 73	3.6 81 70	1.9 75 64
- █ Average max. and min. temperatures in °F
- █ Precipitation totals in inches

The climate of Hainan is mostly tropical. The island's two largest cities, Haikou and Sanya, both possess a tropical Köppen climate. The annual average temperature ranges from 23 to 28 °C (73 to 82 °F), Haikou is 24.7 °C (76.5 °F), Sanya is 26.5 °C (79.7 °F). The coldest months are January when temperatures drop to 17 to 24 °C (63 to 75 °F); the hottest months are June and July, and the temperatures are 26 to 31 °C (79 to 88 °F). The daily average temperature in Hainan in all months is well above 10 °C (50 °F).

The summer in the northern part is hotter and for more than 20 days in a year, the temperature can be higher than 35 °C (95 °F). The average annual precipitation is 1,500 to 2,000 millimeters (59 to 79 in) and can be as high as 2,400 millimeters (94 in) in central and eastern areas, and as low as 900 millimeters (35 in) in the coastal areas of the southwest. Parts of Hainan lie in the path of typhoons, and 70% of the annual precipitation is derived from typhoons and the summer rainy season. Major flooding occurs due to typhoons, which can cause many problems for local residents.

==== Annual fog ====
From January to February, the island of Hainan is often affected by thick fog, particularly in coastal areas and the northern part of the island. This is caused by cold winter air from the north coming into contact with the warmer sea, causing the moisture that evaporates from the sea to be condensed into fog. The fog remains from day to night, and is evenly distributed. Visibility may be reduced to 50 meters (160 ft) for days at a time. During this period, residents normally keep windows shut. The moisture in the air is so extreme that the walls in homes weep, and floors often accumulate a layer of water.

== Flora and fauna ==
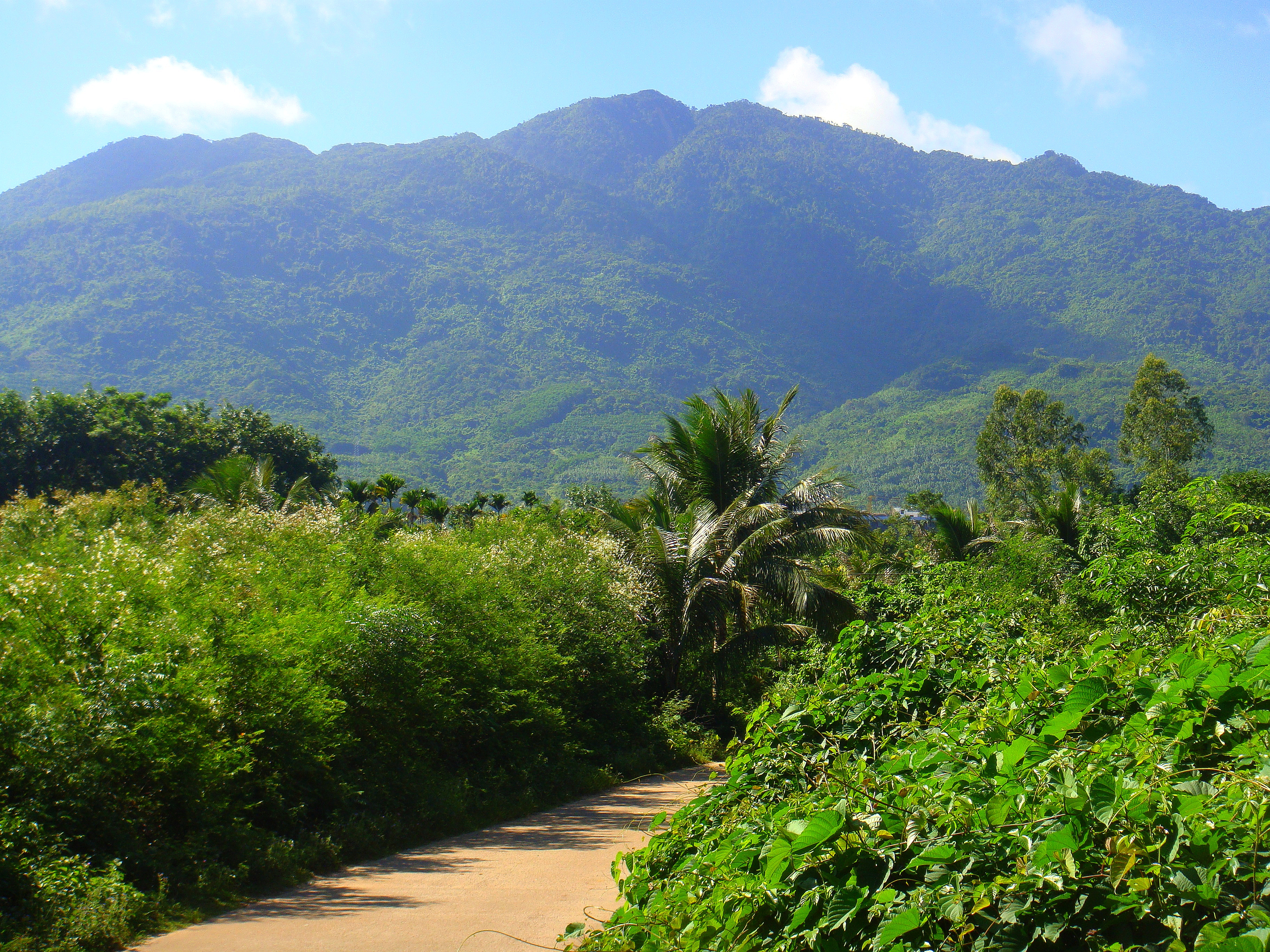
This view in Wanning near the southeast coast is typical of the inland countryside.

Hainan has over 1,500 km^{2} (580 sq mi) of tropical forest, in which can be found over 4,600 types of plants and more than 570 species of animals. The nature observation database iNaturalist.org currently lists 6,687 species of plants, animals and fungi as having been observed on Hainan Island (in 2024). In modern times, however, the small island's natural balance has been threatened, largely due to the introduction of exotic species, as well as human impacts from tourism, deforestation, and the use of herbicides, pesticides and other such pollutants. A report from the Department of Land, Environment and Resources of Hainan Province states that 200 species are near extinction, with six plant species, such as Maytenus hainanensis and Sciaphila tenella, having been declared extinct.

Two ecoregions cover the island. The South China-Vietnam subtropical evergreen forests cover the lowlands, and extend onto the adjacent mainland. The Hainan Island monsoon rainforests covers the interior of the island, and includes montane rain forests with a more seasonal climate and more deciduous trees.

=== Flora ===
The majority of Hainan's land area is covered in forest, with 61.5% total coverage. At the end of 2012, nearly 210,000 hectares (518,921 acres) of forest-cover was reported–an increase of 34,133 hectares (84,340 acres) from the previous year. A further 1,187 hectares (2,930 acres) of grasses and trees have been planted along the province's highways.

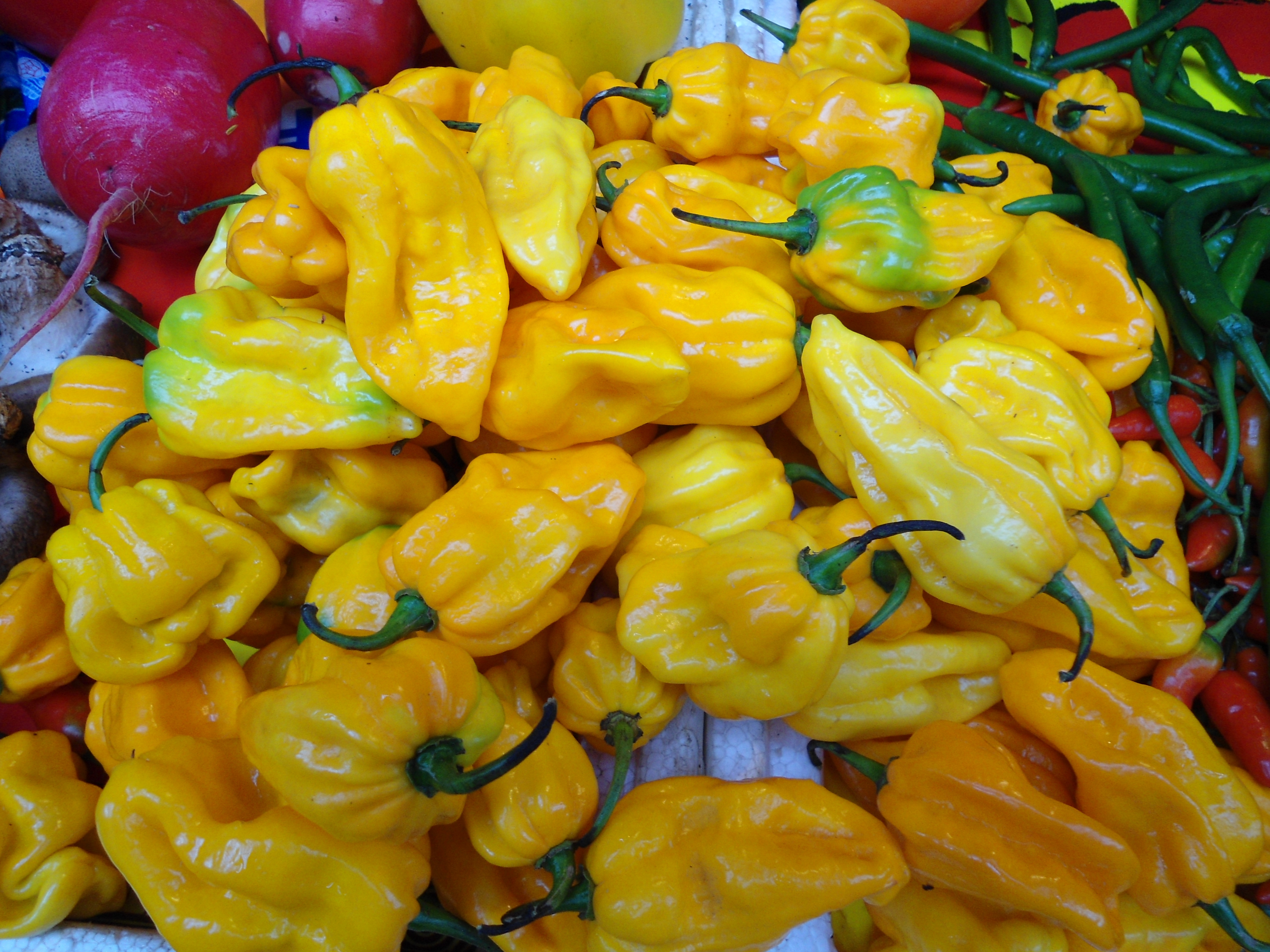
Hainan yellow lantern chili

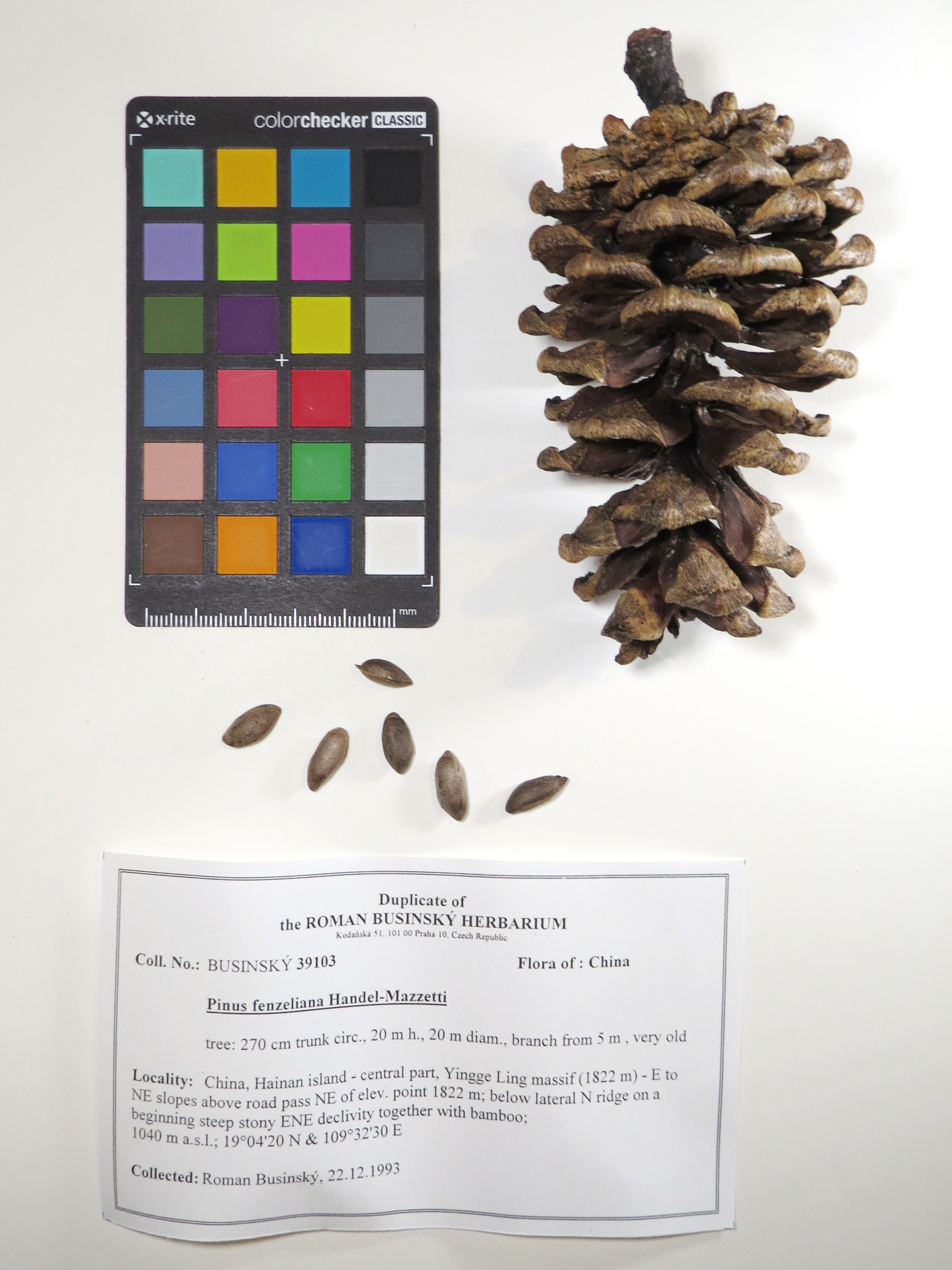
Hainan white pine

There are around 53 genera, belonging to 29 families, of wild fruits, herbs and other significant crops growing on Hainan—both native and introduced—including several types of banana (Musa sp.), as well as cashew (Anacardium occidentale), mango (Mangifera indica), fiber agave (Agave sisalana), pineapple (Ananas comosus), bitter melon (Momordica charantia), ivy gourd (Coccinia grandis), giant taro (Alocasia macrorrhizos), Asian taro (A. odora), Malabar spinach (Basella alba) and papaya (Carica papaya). Four species of pepper grow on the island as well, including the economically significant black pepper (Piper nigrum). At least 25–30 species belonging to the order Zingiberales grow on Hainan, including numerous types of ginger, galangal, canna, turmeric (Curcuma sp.) and prayer-plants (Marantaceae), among others. Coconuts (Cocos sp.) are a fairly common sight along the coastline. Trees found on Hainan include at least 18 species of Ficus, the Hainan white pine (Pinus fenzeliana), Tenasserim pine (Pinus latteri) and several species of orchid tree (Bauhinia).

Four thousand two hundred known species of plants are native to the island, including several endemic species, such as those within the genera Wenchengia and Metapetrocosmea. Additionally, the Cathayanthe and Chunia genera are found only on Hainan and in northern Vietnam.

Notable botanical species include:

- Hainan yellow lantern chili—a pepper similar to the Scotch bonnet.
- Cephalotaxus hainanensis—a species of plum-yew.

=== Fauna ===
Even with over ten million human inhabitants, Hainan contains several protected areas and wildlife preserves. The most ubiquitous smaller species on the island include such animals as frogs, toads, geckos, skinks, and butterflies; as with many adjacent tropical regions, the Arthropoda and invertebrates are well-represented here, with mosquitoes naturally being very common at certain times of the year. The swarms of biting, flying insects actually play a key role in island food chains and ecosystems, not only being consumed by many other species (such as bats and birds) but serving as pollinators for many types of flowering plants. Hainan's lakes and waterways are populated with various freshwater fishes, such as carp and catfish, whose fry readily consume both mosquito eggs and larvae (laid on the water's surface) for sustenance.

About 100 mammalian species are found on Hainan, with the Hainan black crested gibbon (Nomascus hainanus), the Hainan hare (Lepus hainanus), the Hainan gymnure, or moonrat (Neohylomys hainanensis), and the Hainan flying squirrel (Hylopetes electilis) all being endemic to the island. Larger native mammals include the Asiatic black or "moon" bear (Ursus thibetanus), sambar (Rusa unicolor), Eurasian otter (L. lutra), the crab-eating mongoose (Herpestes urva) and the leopard cat (Felis bengalensis), which are considered a species of conservation concern. Other mammals include Siberian chipmunks (Tamias sibiricus), squirrels, masked palm civets and the yellow-bellied weasel.

There are 362 known bird species. Seabirds such as gulls are not generally seen. Egrets and black-winged kites are common in agricultural areas. The Hainan partridge, white-eared night heron, Hainan leaf warbler, and yellow-billed nuthatch are endemic to the island.

Secretive, and sometimes less commonly seen, are the snakes, such as the Asian palm pit viper, the red bamboo snake, and cobras.

In the seas surrounding Hainan, sea turtles and whale sharks are regular visitors.

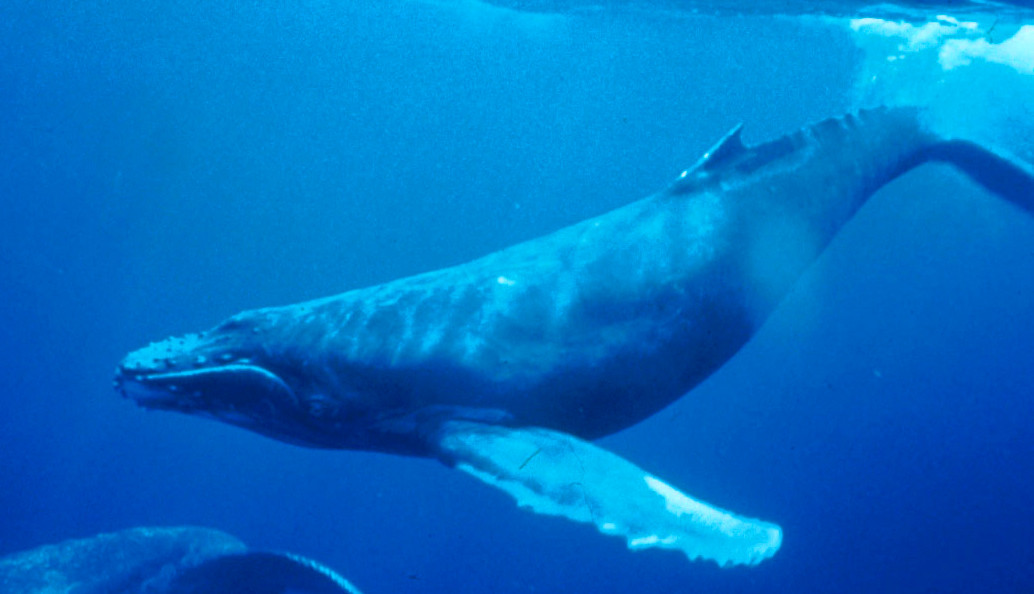
Humpback whale

Hainan island has rich bio-diversity of cetaceans and is the site of studying these in Chinese waters. Many whales such as North Pacific right whales, western gray whales, humpback whales, and blue whales (all of these are almost extinct in Chinese waters) were historically seen in the winter and spring to mate and calve. These gentle giants of the sea had been hunted heavily and were wiped out by Japanese whalers (established whaling stations on various sites on Chinese and Korean coasts including Hainan and Daya Bay). A few Bryde's whales and minke whales may still occur in the adjacent waters along with on Leizhou Peninsula and the Gulf of Tonkin. Smaller species of whale and dolphins, such as short-finned pilot whales and pantropical spotted dolphins, but most notably the endangered Chinese white dolphin. Declared sanctuary for the species extends along the coasts. These dolphins may appear among clearer waters such as in the vicinity of Sanya.

Dugongs still occur in small numbers, mostly on Gulf of Tonkin side.

Notable species include:

- Hainan gymnure (Neohylomys hainanensis or Hainan moonrat) is a small mammal.
- Hainan partridge (Arborophila ardens) is a species of bird endemic to Hainan Island.
- Hainan peacock-pheasant (Polyplectron katsumatae) is an endangered species of the family Phasianidae.
- Hainan black crested gibbon (Nomascus hainanus) is one of the world's most endangered primates. Seacology, a non-profit organization in Berkeley, California, United States, initiated a project to protect the highly endangered Hainan gibbon in exchange for scholarships for the children of four villages near Hainan Bawangling National Nature Reserve.
- Hainan hare (Lepus hainanus) is a species of hare endemic to Hainan.
- A subspecies of the leopard cat (Prionailurus bengalensis alleni) is endemic to Hainan.
- Hainan leaf-warbler (Phylloscopus hainanus) is an Old World warbler in the family Phylloscopidae.
- Little torrent frog (Amolops torrentis) is a species of frog found only on Hainan Island.

== Demographics ==
Distribution of languages and dialects in Hainan: Hainanese Danzhou dialect Be languages (Lincheng dialect) Be languages (Qiongshan dialect) Li/Hlai languages (Ha dialect) Li/Hlai languages (Qi dialect) Li/Hlai languages (Run dialect) Li/Hlai languages (Meifu dialect) Li/Hlai languages (Jiamao language) Kim Mun language of Mienic languages Junjiahua Cun language Hainanese hakka The following languages are not marked: Fuma dialect, Tsat language, Maihua, and Tanka dialect.

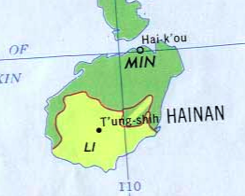
Historical ethnolinguistic groups on Hainan, 1967 map. The dark green region is dominated by the Hainanese varieties of Min Chinese, while people in the light green region mainly speak Li/Hlai languages (Link to entire map including key).

The population density of Hainan is low compared to most coastal Chinese provinces.

In 2000, the ethnic groups of Hainan included the Han-Chinese Hainanese, who are the majority (84% of the population) and speak the Min language, the Li (Hlai) (14.7% of the population); the Miao (0.7%) and the Zhuang (0.6%). The Li, who speak a Tai-Kradai language, are the largest indigenous group on the island in terms of population. Also found on the island are the Utsuls, descendants of Cham refugees, who are classified as Hui by the Chinese government because of their Islamic religion. There is a Tanka community that lives at Sanya Bay.

The Li people mainly reside in the nine cities and counties in the middle and southern part of Hainan – the cities of Sanya, Wuzhishan and Dongfang, the Li autonomous counties of Baisha, Lingshui, Ledong, Changjiang, and the 'Li and Miao Autonomous Counties of Qiongzhong and Baoting'. Some others live elsewhere on Hainan with other ethnic groups in Danzhou, Wanning, Qionghai, Lingshui and Tunchang. The area inhabited by the Li ethnic group totals 18,700 square kilometers (7,200 sq mi), about 55 percent of the province's total.

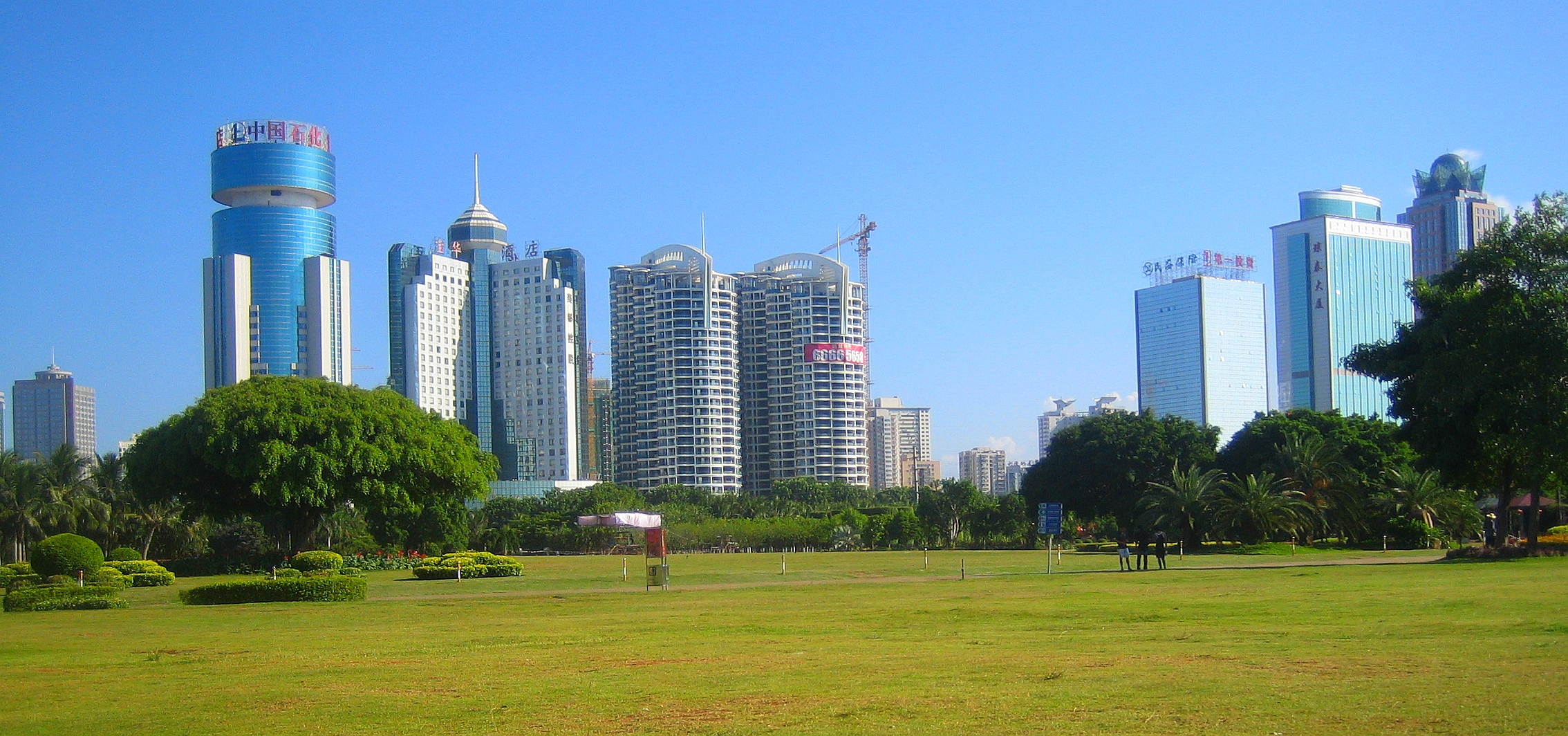
Haikou, the capital of the province as seen looking south from Evergreen Park, a large park located on the north shore of the city

Although they are indigenous to the island and do not speak a Chinese language, the Limgao (Ong-Be) people near the capital are counted as Han Chinese by the Chinese government.

=== Religion ===
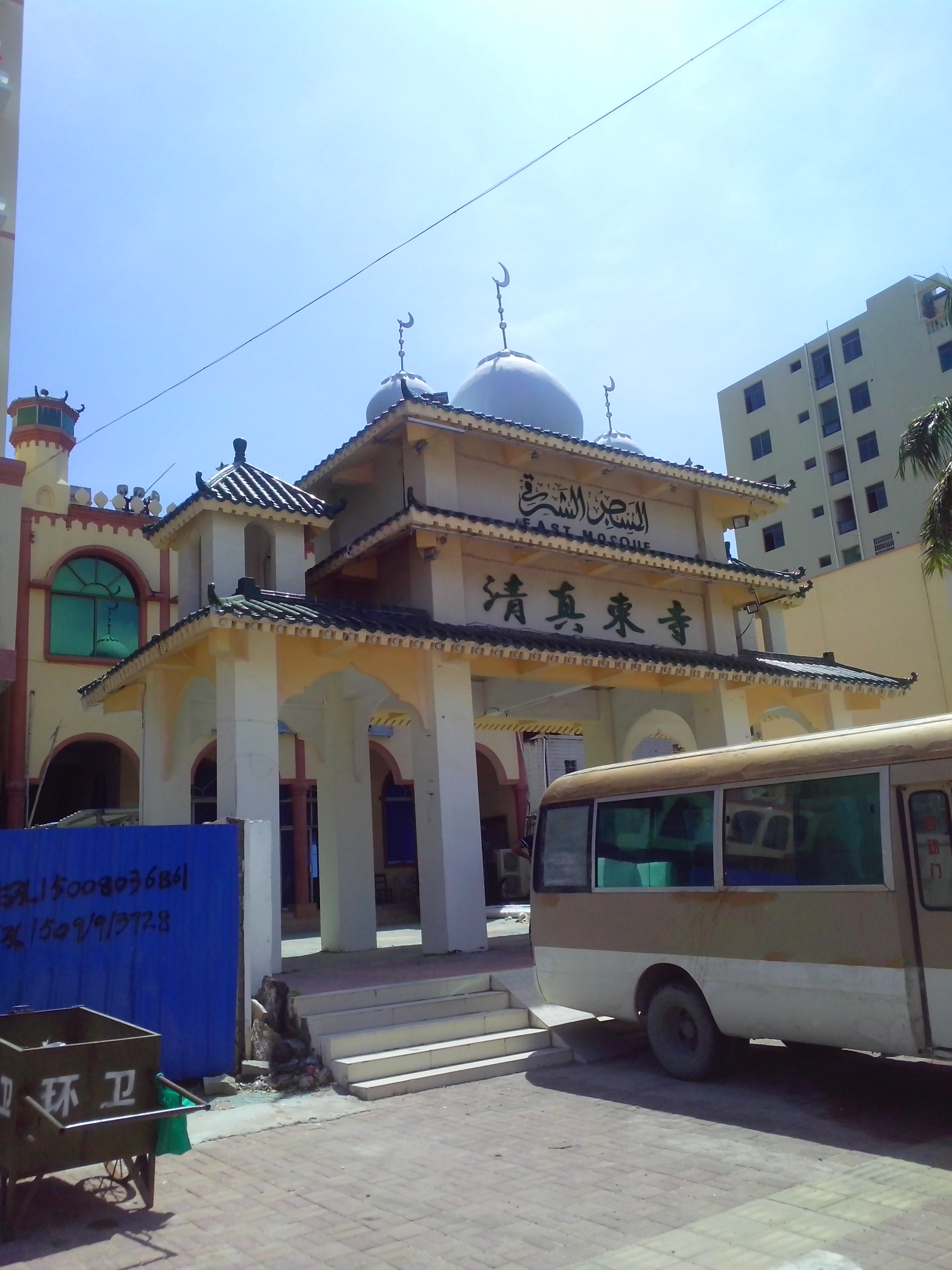
The East Mosque in Sanya is an example of Chinese-Islamic architecture.

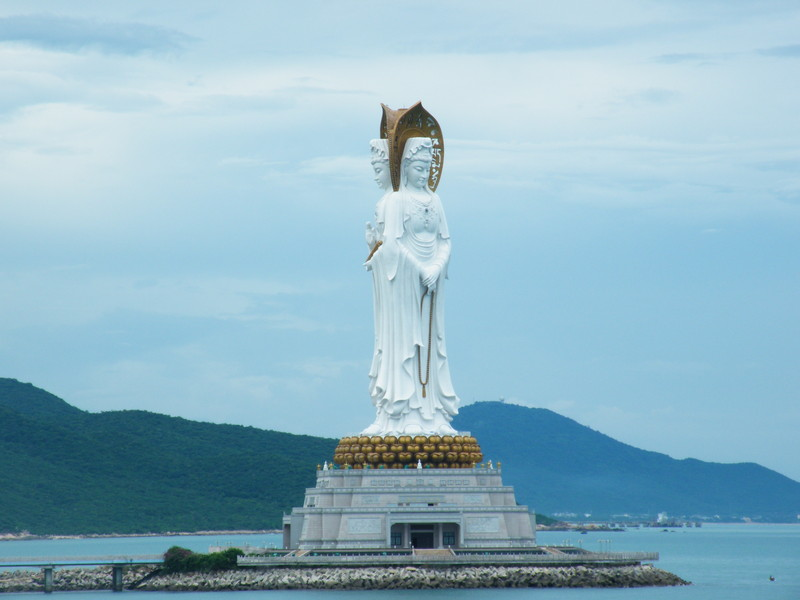
Guanyin of Nanshan

Most of the Hainanese population practices Chinese folk religion and Chinese Buddhism. The Li population has a Theravada Buddhist minority. Most of the Utsuls of the island, a branch of Cham people living near Sanya, are Muslims. Because Hainan was a point in the travel route of missionaries, there are some Christians. According to the Chinese General Social Survey of 2009, Christians constitute 0.48% of the province's population.

=== Languages ===
Most people in Hainan speak a variety of Min Chinese known as Hainanese. Other Chinese varieties and non-Chinese languages are spoken as well:

- Standard Mandarin (Putonghua) is widely known as in the rest of China. Mandarin is especially common in the city of Sanya.
  - In Yacheng city (as well as its vicinity several dozen miles west of Huihui and Huixin), the so-called military speech dialect of Mandarin (the official language of the southwest among the northern Chinese dialects) is spoken.
- Cantonese is spoken by some, particularly in Haikou.
- In Yanglan village in the northeast, two Min dialects, both closely related to Cantonese, are spoken: the Mai dialect and the Danzhou dialect, spoken in Haipo Village in the south, which is the same dialect as the dialect spoken in Danzhou in Dan Country in the northern part of the island.
- The Li, Zhuang and Limgao speak Tai–Kadai languages. Some Li people speak the Jiamao language, which is increasingly argued to be language isolate.
- The Miao speak Hmong–Mien languages.
- There are roughly 4,500 Utsul people living in the villages of Yanglan (羊栏) and Huixin (回新), two villages on the outskirts of Sanya. They speak the Tsat language, a member of the Austronesian Chamic languages.

==== Sociolinguistics ====
Standard Mandarin serves as a lingua franca between different ethnic groups. Adults who are members of a minority also have quite high literacy skills in Chinese. Most adults speak several Chinese dialects, and some also speak Li.

When Chams interact with the Hainanese dialect speakers from within Hainan Province, they use the Hainanese dialect, though younger people generally use Mandarin. Not many can communicate in Li, so the Hainanese dialect or Mandarin is often used.

In the market place and within the Sanya Municipality, the Cham speakers use Cham among themselves, and with others mostly use the Hainanese dialect. However, in the market places near the government seat of Yanglan Township, the Chams either use the Hainanese dialect or the Mai dialect.

=== Life expectancy and longevity ===
The people of Hainan live longer than those on the mainland. At the end of 2017, there were 1,565 centenarians in Hainan. For every 100,000 people in the province, 17.13 were centenarians. As of 8 March 2018, there were 287,700 residents over 80 years of age, making up 3.15% of the population.

== Government ==
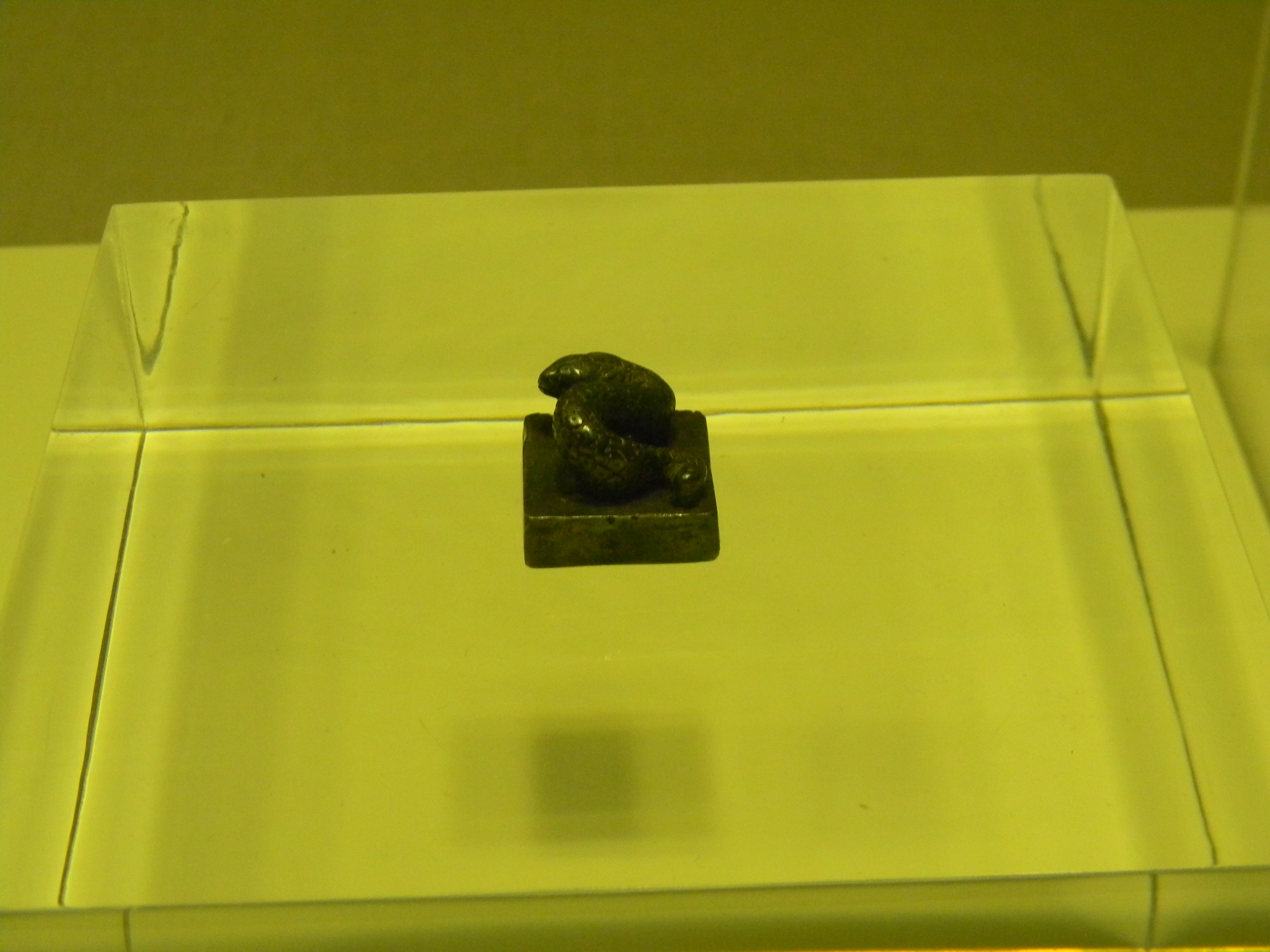
Han dynasty seal unearthed in Hainan in 1984

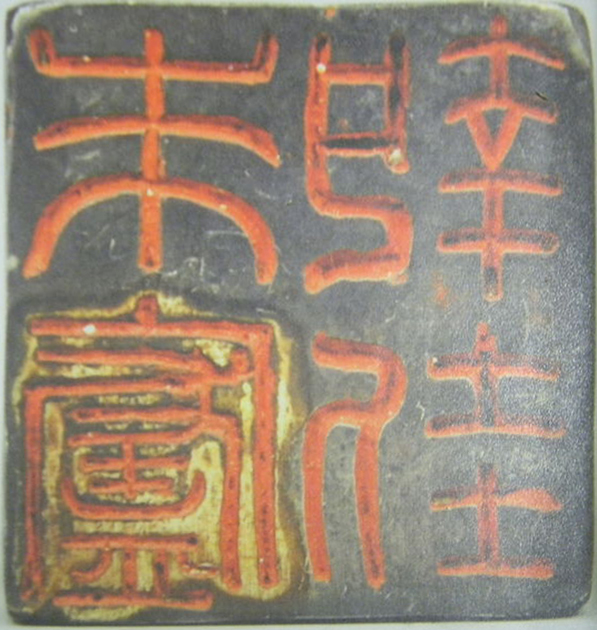
Han seal text: "Zhulu zhikui" – Zhuya commandery was abolished in 46 BC and reorganized as Zhulu county under Hepu Commandery

Even when Hainan Island was a part of Guangdong, it had a considerable amount of local autonomy; the southern half of the island was an autonomous prefecture. Hainan's elevation to provincial level in 1988 increased its accountability to the Central People's Government, but by designating the new province a special economic zone the central government expressed its intent to allow Hainan maximum flexibility in devising programs to facilitate foreign investment and economic growth. Administratively, the province has been divided into five economic major districts.

=== Politics ===
The politics of Hainan is structured in a dual party-government system like all other governing institutions in mainland China.

The Governor of Hainan is the highest-ranking official in the People's Government of Hainan. However, in the province's dual party-government governing system, the Governor has less power and lower rank than the Hainan Chinese Communist Party Provincial Committee Secretary. The current Hainan Party Chief is Shen Xiaoming.

=== Legislation ===
On 13 April 1988, the First Session of the Seventh National People's Congress decided to establish Hainan Province, and at the same time granted the Hainan Provincial People's Congress and its Standing Committee special legislative power. After the 2019 free trade port plan is proposed, Hainan can enact legislation in economic, cultural, local affairs, social management, etc., and implement it in the Hainan Free Trade Zone (port).

=== Intelligence ===
Per the research conducted by Information Warfare Monitor, Hainan is the physical location of GhostNet. The Chinese government has officially denied the existence of a cyber war and intelligence operations anywhere on the island.

=== Administrative ===
In the official PRC territorial claim, Hainan Province includes not just one island, but also some two hundred South China Sea Islands. While the containment of the South China Sea Islands means that Hainan Province has a very large water body, it has a disproportionally small land area. James Shoal (曾母暗沙, Zēngmǔ Ànshā), which is presently marked by the PRC, signifies the country's southernmost border. But Malaysia also claims that it is on their continental shelf.

== Subdivisions ==
Hainan Province uses a slightly different administrative system than the other provinces of China. Most other provinces are divided entirely into prefecture-level divisions, each of which is then divided entirely into county-level divisions. County-level divisions generally do not come directly under the province. In Hainan, nearly all county-level divisions (the eight districts excepted) come directly under the province. This method of division is due to Hainan's relatively sparse population, totaling 9.26 million as of 2017.

Administrative divisions of Hainan
Division code	Division	Area in km^{2}	Population 2020	Seat	Divisions			
Division code	Division	Area in km^{2}	Population 2020	Seat	Districts	Counties	Aut. counties	CL cities
460000	Hainan Province	35,191.00	10,081,232	Haikou city	10	4	6	5
460100	Haikou city	2,304.80	2,873,358	Xiuying District	4			
460200	Sanya city	1,910.67	1,031,396	Jiyang District	4			
460300	Sansha city*	788.00	2,333	Xisha District	2			
460400	Danzhou city^{#}	3,394.00	954,259	Nada town				
469001	Wuzhishan city**	1,131.00	112,269	Tongza town				1
469002	Qionghai city**	1,710.14	528,238	Jiaji town				1
469005	Wenchang city**	2,459.18	560,894	Wencheng town				1
469006	Wanning city**	1,899.90	545,992	Wancheng town				1
469007	Dongfang city**	2,272.29	444,458	Basuo town				1
469021	Ding'an County**	1,187.00	284,690	Dingcheng town		1		
469022	Tunchang County**	1,223.97	255,335	Tuncheng town		1		
469023	Chengmai County**	2,076.28	497,953	Jinjiang town		1		
469024	Lingao County**	1,343.33	420,594	Lincheng town		1		
469025	Baisha Li Autonomous County**	2,117.20	164,699	Yacha town			1	
469026	Changjiang Li Autonomous County**	1,617.70	232,124	Shilu town			1	
469027	Ledong Li Autonomous County**	2,763.53	464,435	Baoyou town			1	
469028	Lingshui Li Autonomous County**	1,121.24	372,511	Yelin town			1	
469029	Baoting Li and Miao Autonomous County**	1,166.78	156,108	Baocheng town			1	
469030	Qiongzhong Li and Miao Autonomous County**	2,704.00	179,586	Yinggen town			1	
* – Sovereignty over Sansha (including the Paracel, Spratly and Zhongsha Islands) is disputed. ** – Directly administered county-level divisions # – direct-piped cities – does not contain any county-level divisions

Administrative divisions in Chinese and varieties of romanizations
English	Chinese	Pinyin	Hainanese Romanzation
Hainan Province	海南省	Hǎinán Shěng	Hai Nam Teng
Haikou city	海口市	Hǎikǒu Shì	Hai Khau Si
Sanya city	三亚市	Sānyà Shì	Tam Ah Si
Sansha city	三沙市	Sānshā Shì	Tam Sa Si
Danzhou city	儋州市	Dānzhōu Shì	Dam Ju Si
Wuzhishan city	五指山市	Wǔzhǐshān Shì	Ngou Ji Tua Si
Qionghai city	琼海市	Qiónghǎi Shì	Kheng Hai Si
Wenchang city	文昌市	Wénchāng Shì	Von Sio Si
Wanning city	万宁市	Wànníng Shì	Van Neng Si
Dongfang city	东方市	Dōngfāng Shì	Dang Fang Si
Ding'an County	定安县	Dìng'ān Xiàn	Deng An Kuai
Tunchang County	屯昌县	Túnchāng Xiàn	Ton Siang Kuai
Chengmai County	澄迈县	Chéngmài Xiàn	Deng Mai Kuai
Lingao County	临高县	Língāo Xiàn	Liom Ko Kuai
Baisha Li Autonomous County	白沙黎族自治县	Báishā Lízú Zìzhìxiàn	Be Tua Loitoc Seji Kuai
Changjiang Li Autonomous County	昌江黎族自治县	Chāngjiāng Lízú Zìzhìxiàn	Siang Kiang Loitoc Seji Kuai
Ledong Li Autonomous County	乐东黎族自治县	Lèdōng Lízú Zìzhìxiàn	Loc Dong Loitoc Seji Kuai
Lingshui Li Autonomous County	陵水黎族自治县	Língshuǐ Lízú Zìzhìxiàn	Leng Tui Loitco Seji Kuai
Baoting Li and Miao Autonomous County	保亭黎族苗族自治县	Bǎotíng Lízú Miáozú Zìzhìxiàn	Bo Deng Loitoc Miautoc Seji Kuai
Qiongzhong Li and Miao Autonomous County	琼中黎族苗族自治县	Qióngzhōng Lízú Miáozú Zìzhìxiàn	Kheng Tong Loitoc Miautoc Seji Kuai

Population by urban areas of prefecture & county cities
#	Cities	2020 Urban area	2010 Urban area	2020 City proper
1	Haikou	2,349,239	1,517,410	2,873,358
2	Sanya	724,854	453,819	1,031,396
3	Danzhou	516,043	418,834 (Note: Danzhou CLC is currently known as Danzhou PLC after 2010 census.)	954,259
4	Wenchang	341,862	251,795	560,894
5	Qionghai	262,524	194,400	528,238
6	Dongfang	257,936	153,726	444,458
7	Wanning	225,608	221,263	545,992
8	Wuzhishan	67,645	53,268	112,269
9	Sansha	2,333	(Note: Xisha, Nansha, and Zhongsha Administrative Zone was under Sanya PLC jurisdiction. Sansha PLC was established after 2010 census.)	2,333

=== Military base ===
Hainan Island is home to the People's Liberation Army Navy Hainan Submarine Base and strategic nuclear submarine naval harbor at Yalong Bay. The naval base is estimated to be 60 feet (18 m) high, built into hillsides around a military base. The caverns are capable of hiding up to 20 nuclear submarines from spy satellites. The harbor houses nuclear ballistic missile submarines and is large enough to accommodate aircraft carriers. The U.S. Department of Defense has estimated that China will have five type 094 submarines operational by 2010 with each capable of carrying 12 JL-2 ballistic missiles. Two 950-meter (3,120 ft) piers and three smaller ones would be enough to accommodate two carrier strike groups or amphibious assault ships.

== Economy ==
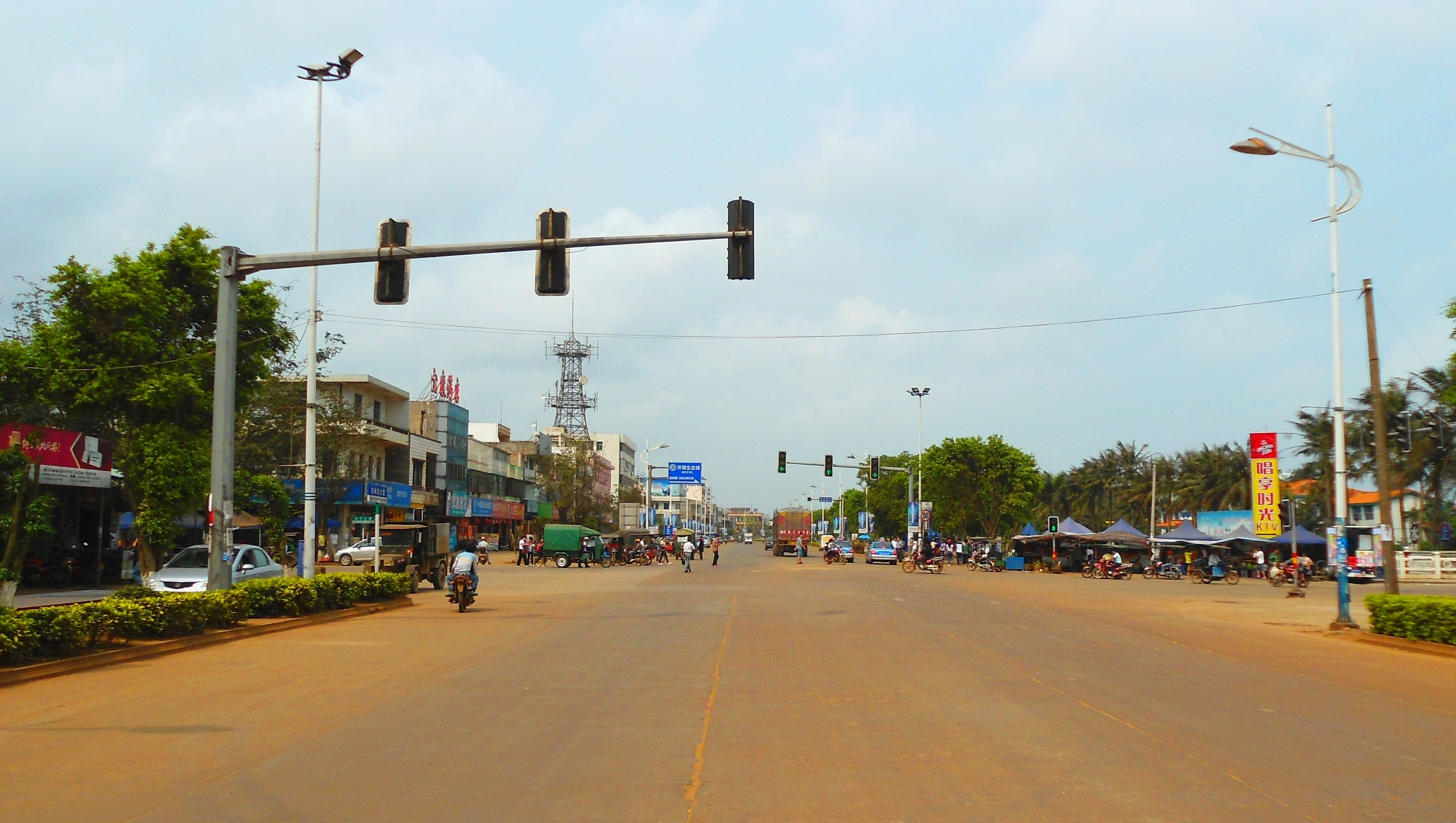
2012

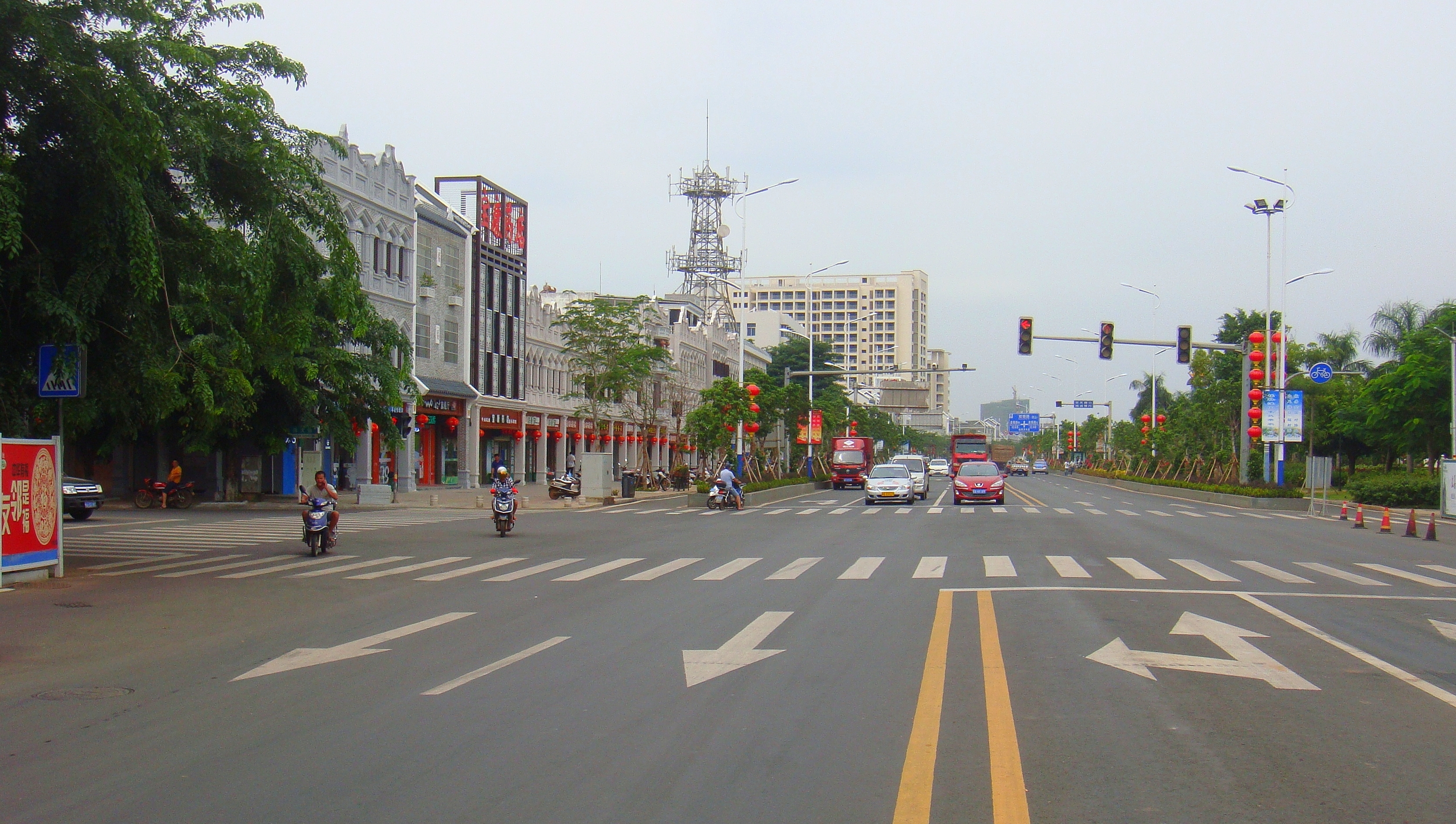
2016

A typical example of an urban development. The above images show the same place in Guilinyang roughly four and a half years apart.

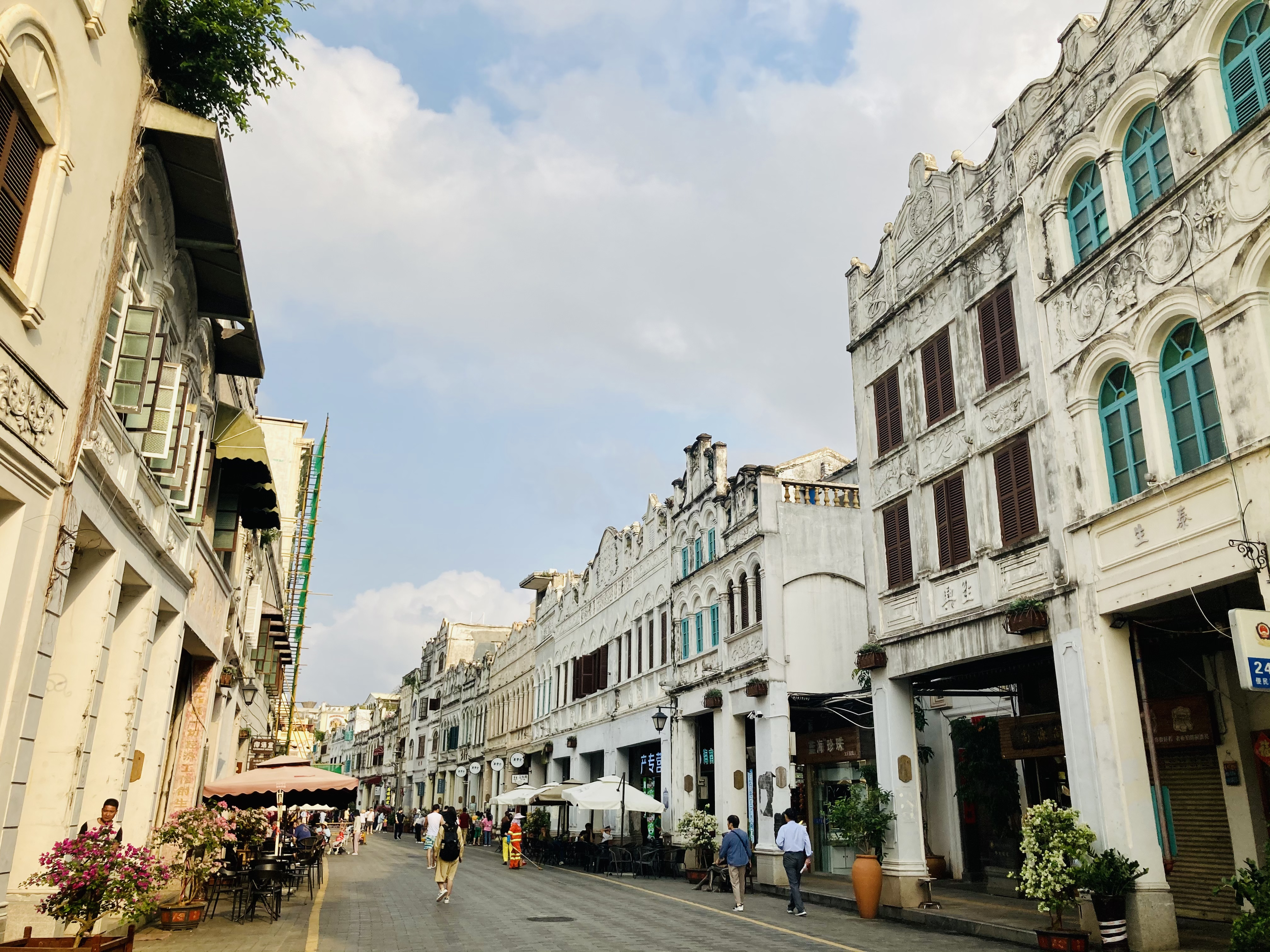
Old town of Haikou, 2021

Hainan's economy is predominantly agricultural, and more than a half of the island's exports are agricultural products. Hainan's elevation to province-level status (1988), however, was accompanied by its designation as China's largest "special economic zone", the intent being to hasten the development of the island's plentiful resources. Prior to this, the province had a reputation for being a "Wild West" area, largely untouched by industrialization; even today there are relatively few factories in the province. Tourism plays an important part of Hainan's economy, thanks largely to its tropical beaches and lush forests. The central government has encouraged foreign investment in Hainan and has allowed the island to rely to a large extent on market forces.

Hainan's industrial development largely has been limited to the processing of its mineral and agricultural products, particularly rubber and iron ore. Since the 1950s, machinery, farm equipment, and textiles have been manufactured in the Haikou area for local consumption. A major constraint on industrial expansion has been an inadequate supply of electricity. Much of the island's generating capacity is hydroelectric, and it is subject to seasonal fluctuations in stream and river flows.

In December 2009, the government of China announced that it plans to establish Hainan as an "international tourist destination" by 2020. This announcement contributed to a surge in the province's economy, with a year-on-year increase in investment of 136.9% in the first three months of 2010. Hainan's real estate sector accounted for more than one third of the province's economic growth.

According to the Statistical Communiqué of National Economic and Social Development of the statistical authority, the GDP of Hainan Province in 2017 was 446.3 billion yuan (66.1 billion US dollars), up by 7.0 percent over the previous year. Of this total, the value added of the primary industry was 97.9 billion yuan (14.5 billion US dollars), up by 3.6 percent, that of the secondary industry was 99.7 billion yuan (14.8 billion US dollars), up by 2.7 percent and that of the tertiary industry was 248.6 billion yuan (36.8 billion US dollars), up by 10.2 percent. The value added of the primary industry accounted for 21.95 percent of the GDP; that of the secondary industry accounted for 22.34 percent; and that of the tertiary industry accounted for 55.71 percent. The per capita GDP in 2017 was 48,430 yuan (7,173 US dollars).

=== Agriculture ===
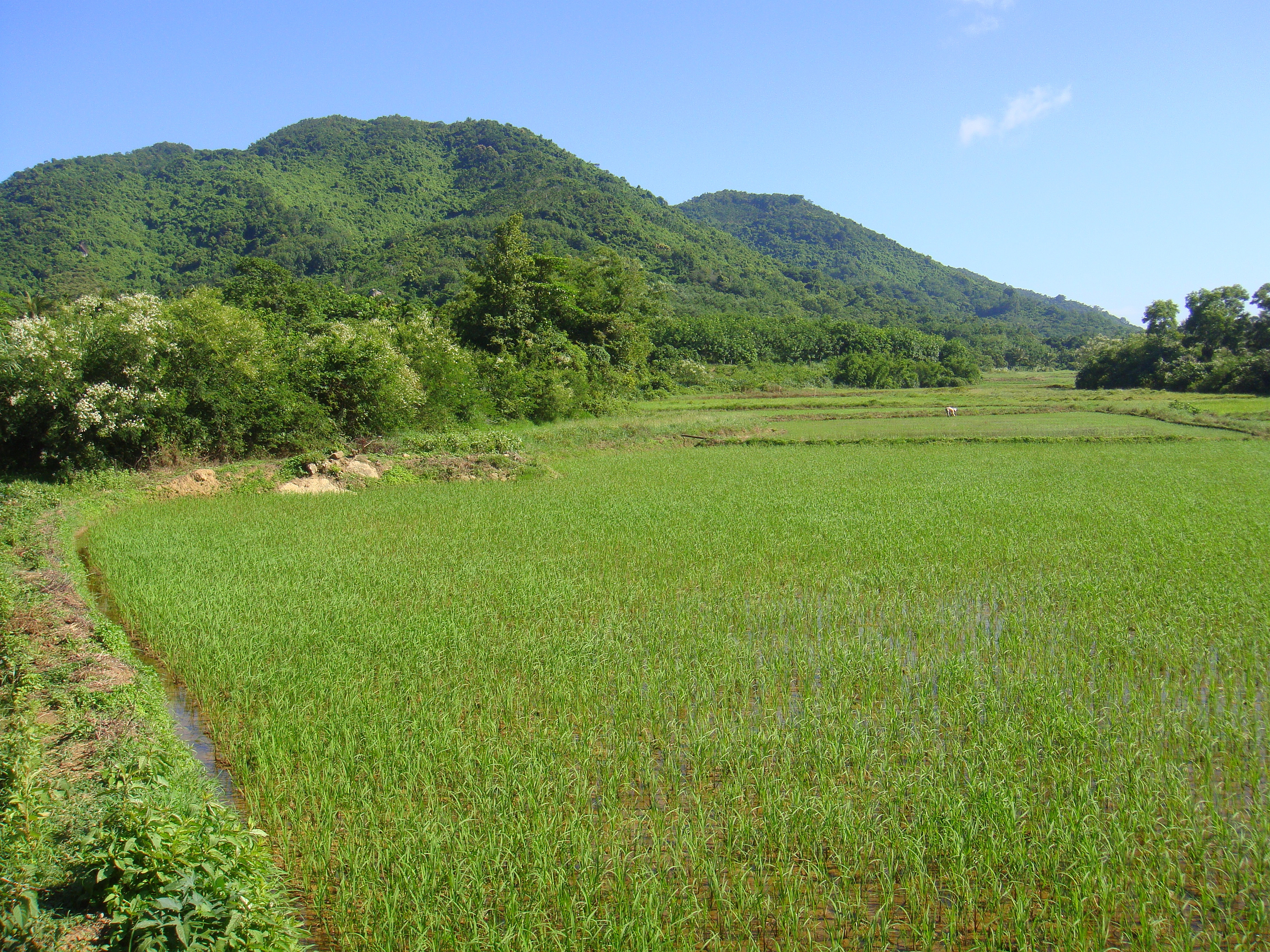
One of the many rice fields in Hainan

Owing to Hainan's tropical climate, paddy rice is cultivated extensively in the northeastern lowlands and in the southern mountain valleys. Leading crops other than rice include coconut, palm oil, sisal, tropical fruits (including pineapples, of which Hainan is China's leading producer), black pepper, coffee, tea, cashews, and sugarcane.

The hot Hainan yellow lantern chili, a variety similar to the scotch bonnet, is unique to the island, and is grown in the southeast and southwest.

The total tropical crop area of Hainan is 100,000 hectares.

Hainan is a major rubber producer. In the early 20th century Chinese emigrants returning from then British Malaya, introduced rubber trees to the island; after 1950, state farms were developed, and Hainan now produces a substantial amount of China's rubber. Natural rubber is now grown on 246,000 hectares of land. This ranks 6th in the world in harvest area and 5th in terms of output.

Hainan has almost 93,000 hectares of areca palms. The product, the areca nut, is consumed locally and also sent to the mainland. Ninety-five percent of China's production of this nut is produced in Hainan.

Domesticated farm animals comprise mainly goats, cows, water buffalo, chickens, geese and ducks.

==== Fisheries ====
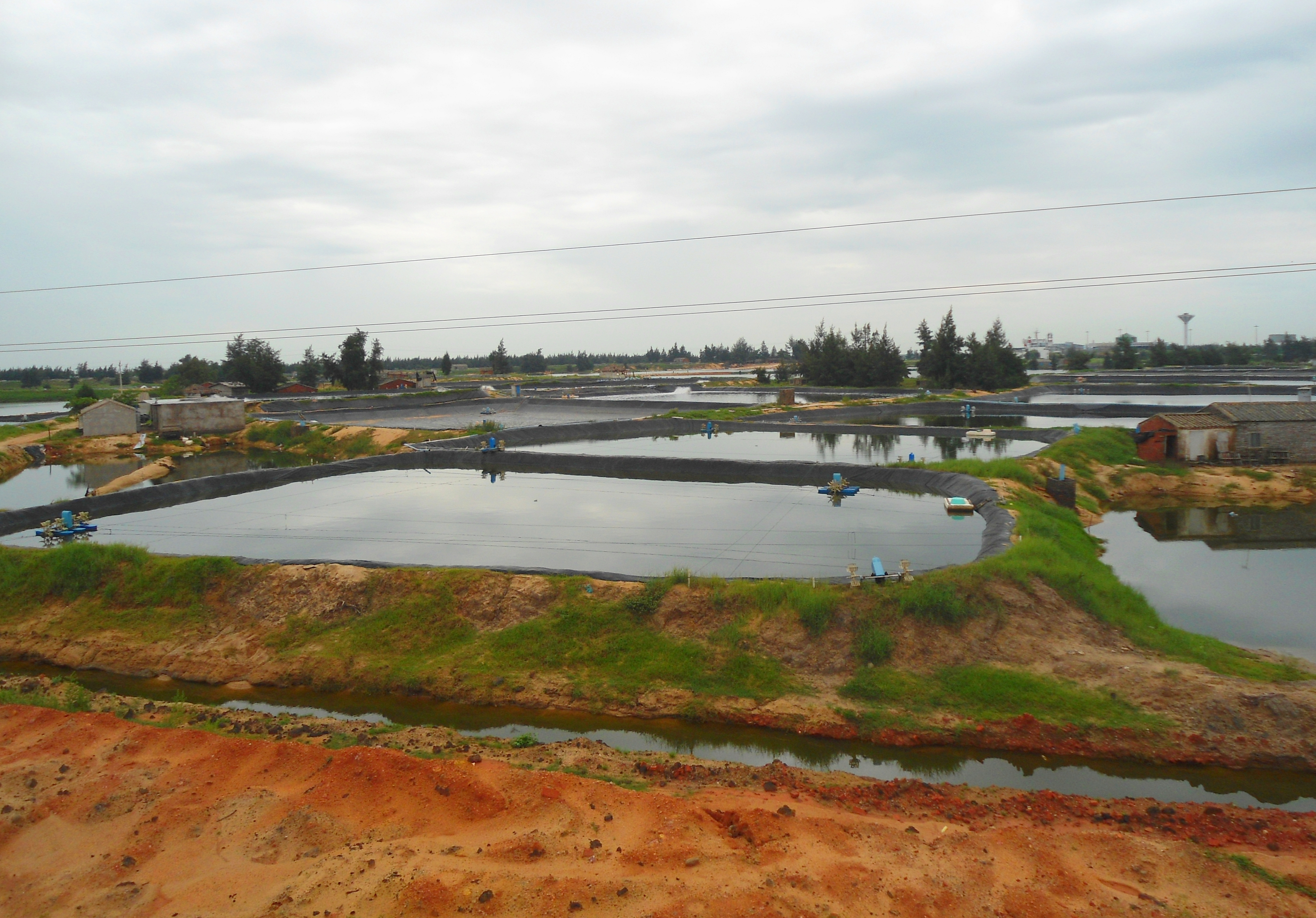
Fish farms in Chengmai

Grouper, Spanish mackerel, and tuna constitute the bulk of the catch from offshore fishing grounds. Scallops and pearls are raised in shallow bays and basins for local use and export.

Shrimp production is estimated to have been 120,000 to 150,000 metric tons (130,000 to 170,000 short tons) in 2007, more than 50% of which was exported. Hainan has over 400 hatcheries, most being located between Wenchang and Qionghai.

Tilapia production in 2008 was 300,000 metric tons (330,000 short tons). The island has an estimated 100,000 local, commercial fish farming families.

=== Tourism ===
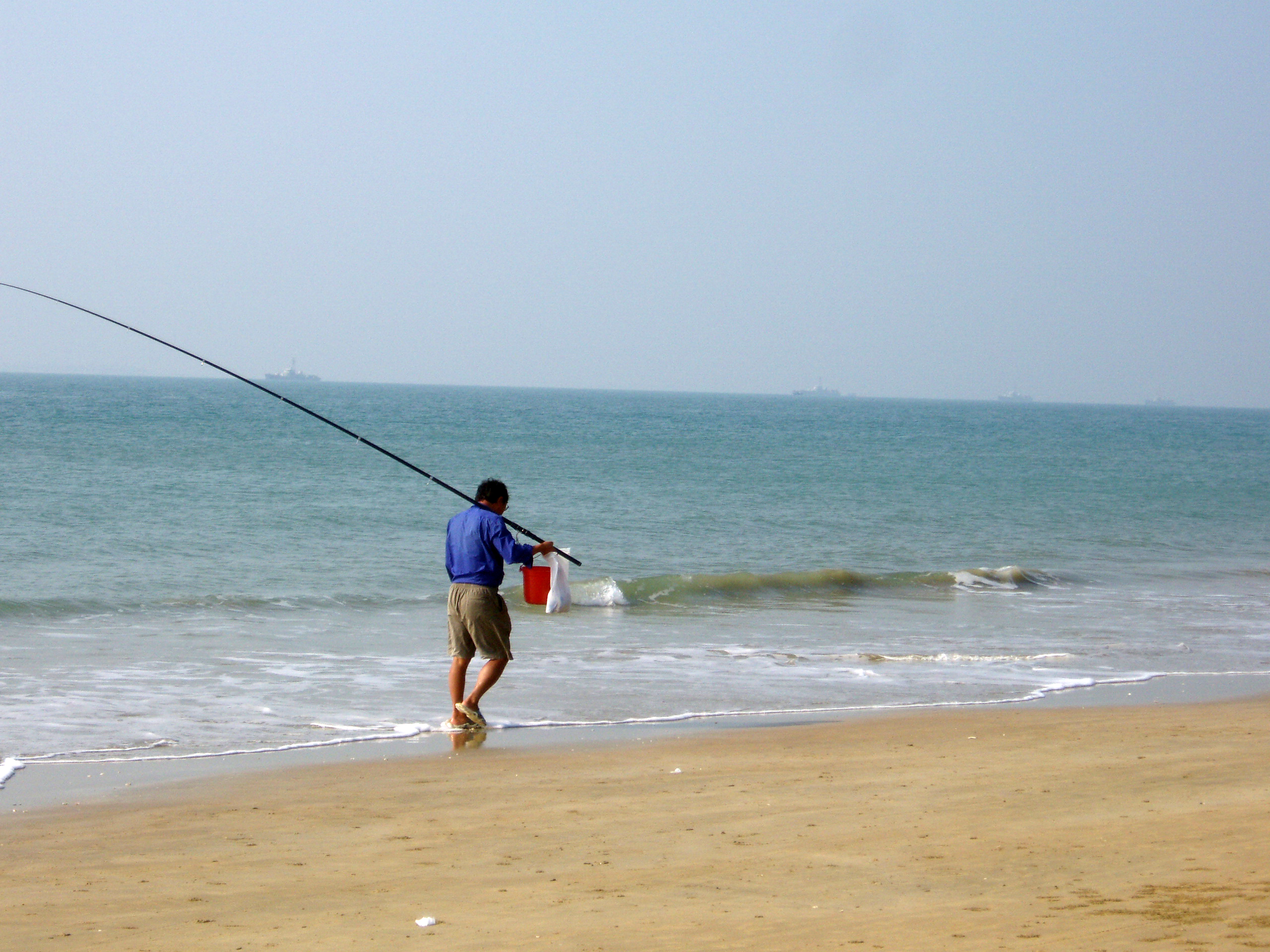
Located in Sanya, this beach is typical of those along the entire eastern coast of Hainan

Hainan Island is often divided into eight regions for tourism purposes: Haikou and area (Haikou, Qiongshan, Ding'an); the Northeast (Wenchang); the Central East Coast (Qionghai, Ding'an); the South East Coast; the South (Sanya); the West Coast also called the Chinese Riviera (Ledong, Dongfang, Xianghsui, Changjiang); the North West (Danzhou, Lingao, Chengmai); and the Central Highlands (Baisha, Qiongzhong, and Wuzhishan/Tongzha).

Popular tourist destinations include the beaches and resorts in the southern part of the province. Inland is Five Finger Mountain, a scenic area. Tourists also visit the capital of Haikou with area visitor attractions such as Movie Town Haikou and Holiday Beach.

==== Visa requirements ====
In 2000, the province initiated a visa-upon-arrival policy for foreign tourist groups. It is available to citizens of twenty-six countries, and was established in order to attract visitors.

Beginning 1 May 2018, citizens of 59 countries will be able to visit Hainan for 30 days without requiring a visa, provided that they come on a tour via a travel agency. Countries included among the 59 are: Argentina, Australia, Austria, Belgium, Brazil, Canada, Chile, the Czech Republic, Denmark, Finland, France, Germany, Greece, Hungary, Iceland, Indonesia, Ireland, Italy, Japan, Kazakhstan, Malaysia, Mexico, the Netherlands, New Zealand, Norway, the Philippines, Poland, Portugal, Russia, Singapore, Spain, South Korea, Sweden, Switzerland, Thailand, UAE, Ukraine, the United Kingdom, and the United States.

==== Statistics ====
During 2008, 20.6 million tourists visited Hainan, producing total revenues of 19.23 billion yuan (US$2.81 billion). Of these tourists, 979,800 were from overseas with the largest numbers coming from South Korea, Russia and Japan.

In 2010, the amount of overnight tourists visiting Hainan was 25.87 million, 663,000 of which came from outside China.

During 2011, more than 30 million tourists visited Hainan, mostly from mainland China. Of the 814,600 overseas tourists, 227,600 of them came from Russia, a 53.3 percent a rise year-on-year. Total revenue during that year was 32 billion RMB ($4.3 billion US), up 25 percent from 2010.

In the first quarter of 2012, the Hainan Provincial Tourism Development Commission reports that Hainan received 208,300 overnight visitors, 25 percent of whom came from Russia.

In 2014, Hainan received 50.2 million tourists, 660,000 of whom were from overseas.

During 2015, Hainan received 53 million visitors.

In 2016, over 60 million tourists went to Hainan, up 12.9% from 2015.

During 2018, the province received over 76 million domestic and overseas tourists, a year-on-year increase of 11.8%. Revenue also increased 14.5% compared to the previous year for a total of 95 billion RMB (US$14 billion).

==== Medical tourism ====
The government of Hainan is expanding the province's medical tourism industry. The provincial government has established the Boao Lecheng International Medical Tourism Pilot Zone in the Bo'ao area. The zone is located six kilometers from the Boao Forum for Asia and covers 20 square kilometers. This was announced at the Boao Forum for Asia in 2011. The State Council has approved the development of Lecheng Island as a medical tourism-themed destination. Lecheng Island is a small island in the Wanquan River about 3 km (1.9 mi) west of the coastal town of Bo'ao on the west coast of the province. Construction on the 20 km^{2}. The zone was begun in December 2014 and will cost a projected 1.5 billion yuan. It was scheduled for completion in 2016 and is the first special zone for medical travel in China. As part of the zone, the Boao Super Hospital opened in 2018.

==== Historical sites ====
Haikou is the province's capital and contains interesting historic sites. Also known as Coconut City, Haikou is a major port. The Five Officials Temple (Chinese: 五公祠; pinyin: Wǔgōng cí, 20°0′35.79″N 110°21′17.34″E) consists of five traditional temples and halls that were built in honor of five officials of the Tang (618–907) and Song (960–1279) dynasties. These officials were banished to Hainan for periods ranging from 11 days to 11 years for speaking out against what they felt were wrong practices by the emperors. (It is perhaps significant that the establishment of the Five Officials Temple in the late 19th century coincides with a time when China's territorial integrity was under threat, and that several of the officials honored here were exiled for espousing aggressive policies on the recapture of the north of China from the Jurchens during the Southern Song dynasty.)

Xiuying Fort was built in 1891 to defend the southeastern corner of China during the Sino-French War. The Xiuying Fort Barbette covers about a third of an acre. Its five large cannons are still intact and viewable at the site.

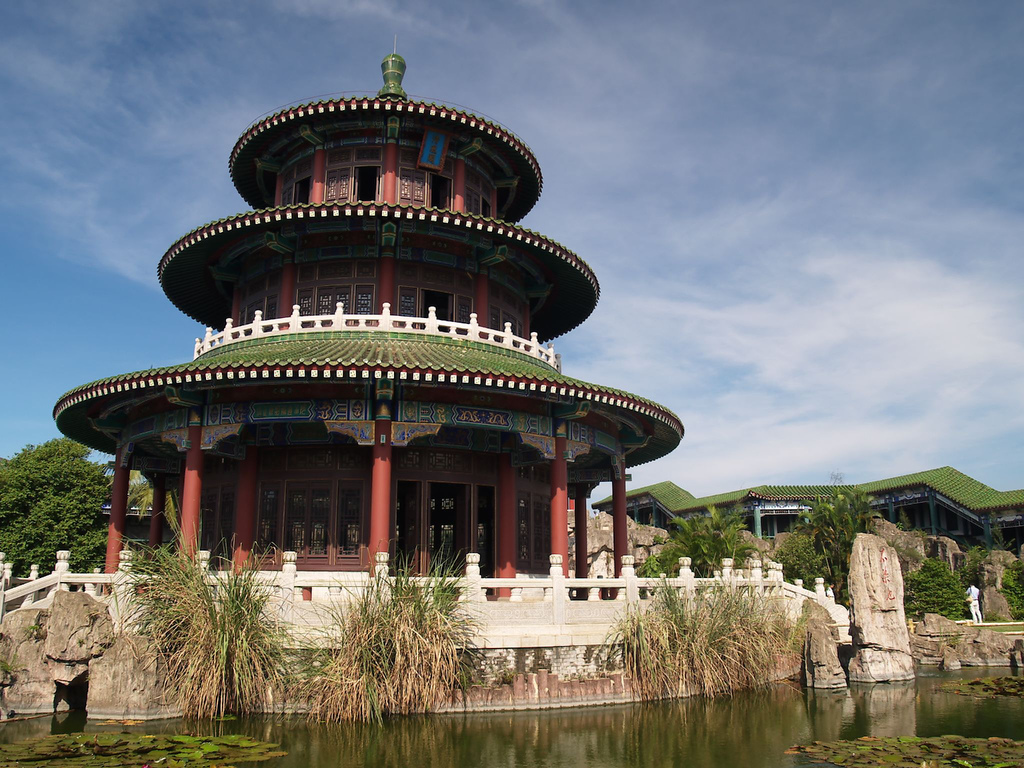
Tomb of Hai Rui

The Tomb of Hai Rui (20°0′29.66″N 110°17′30.18″E) is a key national cultural protection site. Hai Rui was a compassionate and popular official of Hainanese origins who lived during the Ming dynasty. He was famous for his lifelong honesty and his willingness to speak out on behalf of local people. In later life, Hai Rui was persecuted and fell out of favor with the emperor. His admirers built the Hai Rui Tomb after his death to commemorate his great works. Construction of the tomb began in 1589.

The Yangpu Ancient Salt Field is a heritage site in Yantian village on Yangpu Peninsula. The area comprises more than 1,000 stones, cut flat on top, used to dry seawater to produce salt.

==== Other attractions and destinations ====
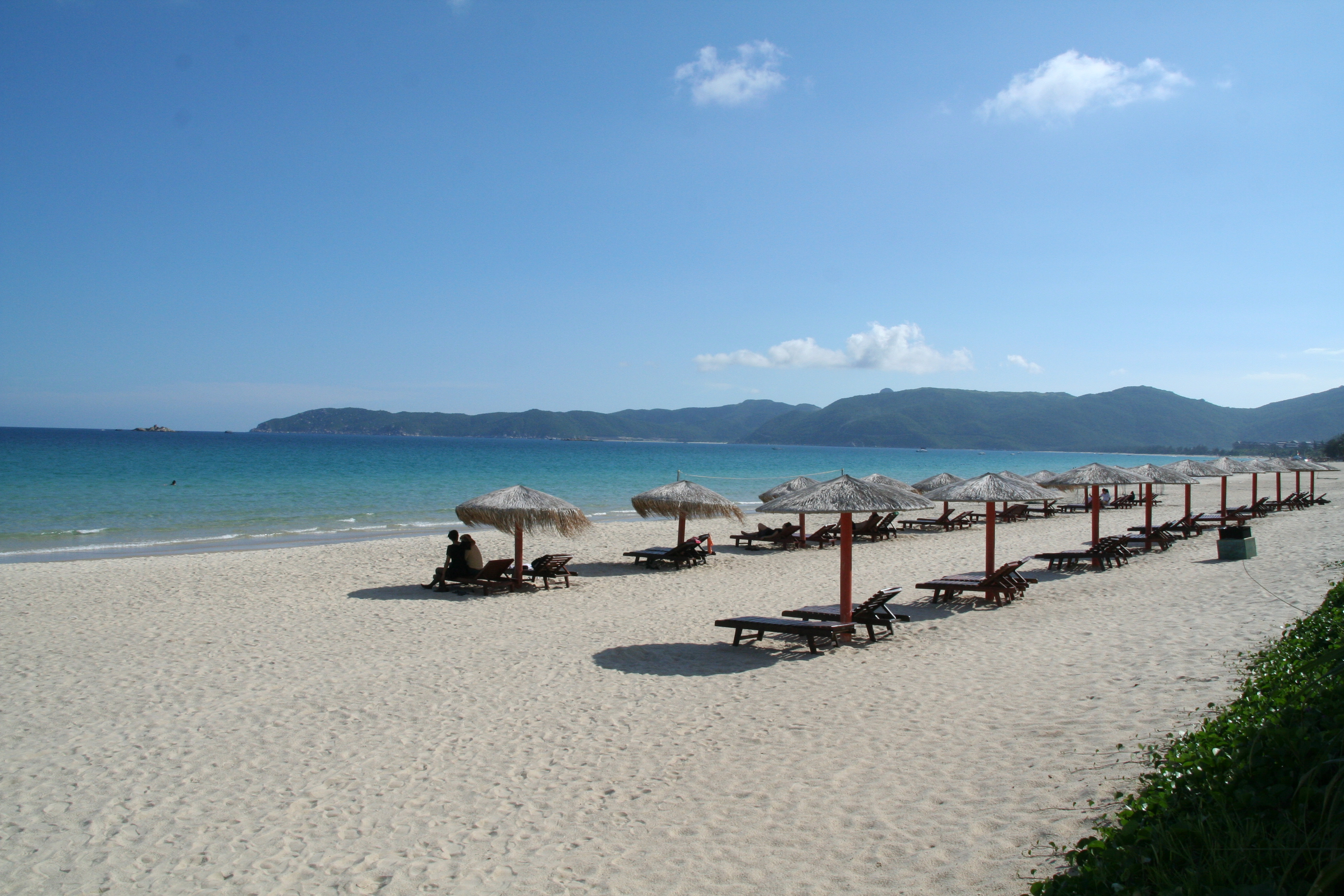
Yalong Bay, the most expensive and well-known beach in Hainan, and the location of numerous 5-star hotels.

Hainan Island has a number of beaches, hot springs and other attractions. Some top scenic sites include Yalong bay National Resort; Dadonghai Tourist Resort; Qizhi Shan (Seven Finger Mountain), Nuilin mountain tropical botanical reserve in Lingshui county, Guantang Hot Spring Resort, Shishan Volcanic Garden; the Wanquan River, Baishi Ridge Scenic Zone and Baihua Ridge.

Other attractions in Hainan include:

- Phoenix Island, an artificial island in Sanya Bay.
- Monkey Island, near the well-known perfume bay or Xiangshui Wan, a popular tourist destination located in Lingshui County, is a state-protected nature reserve for macaques.
- Yalong Bay (Crescent Dragon Bay or Yalong Wan), a 7 km (4.3 mi) long beach east of Sanya City.
- Xiangshui Bay Scenic Area, 48 km (30 mi) from Sanya Tiandu.
- Luobi Cave, 15 km (9.3 mi) north of Sanya City.
- Nanshan Temple, a Buddhist cultural area west of Sanya featuring a 108 meters (354 ft) statue of Guanyin, Buddhist Goddess of Mercy.
- Yanoda is a rainforest area. It is open to visitors with guided walking tours, a zipline, and a waterfall climbing activity.
- Atlantis Sanya - a luxury resort in Sanya

==== Yachting ====
To encourage the international yachting community, new regulations now allow foreign yachts to stay for a total of 183 days each year, with a maximum single stay duration of 30 days. 13 additional ports will be built around the island to accommodate this market.

=== Duty-free program ===
On 20 April 2011, a pilot duty-free program commenced with the aim of increasing luxury goods purchases. It permits domestic Chinese visitors to claim tax refunds on imported luxury items purchased within the province. The maximum value is set at 5,000 yuan (US$762), with lowered tax rates on purchases over 5,000 yuan. In October 2012, duty limits were raised to 8,000 yuan ($1,273), and became available to both domestic and international tourists.

The total sales of duty-free products for 2012 was 2.4 billion yuan.

The world's largest duty-free shopping complex is scheduled to open in Haitang Bay in August 2014.

During 2018 Spring Festival, Hainan recorded a 25% increase in duty-free revenue, with 450 million yuan ($71 million) in sales. The two duty-free shops, located in Sanya and Haikou, received about 99,000 customers, a 32% gain.

During 2018, the two duty-free shops had sales of more than 10 billion RMB and received 2.88 million customers.

=== Natural resources ===
Hainan has commercially exploitable reserves of more than 30 minerals. Iron, first mined by the Japanese during their occupation of the island in World War II, is the most important. Also important are titanium, manganese, tungsten, bauxite, molybdenum, cobalt, copper, gold, and silver. There are large deposits of lignite and oil shale on the island, and significant offshore finds of oil and natural gas have been discovered. Virgin forests in the interior mountains contain more than 20 commercially valuable species, including teak and sandalwood.

=== Real estate market ===
In 1990, Hainan province was the site of the largest property bust in modern Chinese history With 2009 and the announcement of the Chinese Government's plan to develop the province into a major international tourist location, property sales rose by 73%, creating the possibility of another bubble in Hainan's property market.

Since March 2010, commercial and residential property values in some parts of Hainan have slowed down since the market peaked in February. In March, average month-on-month transaction prices dropped 12.82% to 12,280 RMB per square meter, with a reduction in volume to 627,000 square meters (6,750,000 sq ft), a 19.05% decline. Later in April, prices declined 2.84% to 11,932 yuan per square metre, with a 57.59% decline in volume to 567,200 square meters (6,105,000 sq ft). Then in May prices declined a further 29.74% from the previous month to 8,483 yuan per square metre, with a 57.95% decline in volume to 229,000 square meters (2,460,000 sq ft). However, property prices in the tourist resort of Sanya remain strong as of January 2011, with prime developments selling at prices of up to 80,000 RMB per square metre.

Data for 2016 data shows that Hainan saw an increase in house sales of 44%. Volume in sales was 129 billion RMB ($18.82 billion) which is a rise of 51.2 percent year-on-year. During that year in November, commercial apartments in Sanya sold for 20,695 RMB per square meter a rise of 15.75% year-on-year. The total amount of Sanya real estate sold during that time was 212,400 square meters.

Out of China's twenty leading real estate developers, eighteen had invested in Hainan during 2016.

In the beginning of 2017, the price for a house in Haikou was approximately 8,000 RMB ($1,170) per square meter and 20,000 RMB ($2,977) per square meter in Sanya.

==== New 2018 regulations ====
On 23 April 2018, new rules came into effect regarding home purchases in Hainan. To be able to buy a house, non-Hainan residents must prove that they have a minimum of one family member who has been paying taxes or social security for at least 2 years.

Those non-Hainan residents who wish to purchase a house in Haikou, Sanya and Qionghai must prove that they have a minimum of one family member who has been paying taxes or social security for at least 5 years.

In Wuzhishan, Baoting, Qiongzhong and Baisha (the "central ecological core areas"), houses may only be purchased by local residents.

When non-residents do buy a property, the down payment must be at least 70 per cent. In order to curb speculation, owners may not sell their property for five years after receiving their ownership certificate.

=== Golf industry ===
This industry is expanding in Hainan, with numerous courses being constructed, including Mission Hills Haikou, which is one of the largest golf complexes in the world. The golf industry attracts foreign investment and overseas golfers from such countries as Australia, South Korea, and Japan.

=== Automotive industry ===
Automotive manufacturing is one of eight industrial pillar industries. Hainan's automotive output was 39,600 in 2017, down by 41.1 percent over the previous year. Domestic Chinese manufacturer, Haima Automobile has its global headquarters in Haikou.

=== Foreign trade ===
As of 2017, the total value of imports and exports of goods reached 70,237 million yuan (10,403 million US dollars). Of which, the value of goods exported was 29,566 million yuan (4,379 million US dollars), the value of goods imported was 40,671 million yuan (6,024 million US dollars).

Asean was Hainan's largest export trade partner in 2017, the value of goods exported to Asean was 12,289 yuan (1,820 million US dollars), accounted for 41.56 per cent of the total value of goods exported. Its second-largest foreign trade partner was Hong Kong, the value of goods exported to Hong Kong was 2,966 yuan (439 million US dollars), accounted for 10.03 per cent of that. the 3rd largest partner was EU, the value of goods exported to EU was 2,186 yuan (324 million US dollars), accounted for 7.39 per cent of that.

=== Hainan Free trade port ===
On 13 April 2018, General Secretary of the Chinese Communist Party Xi Jinping announced a plan to gradually make the island into a pilot free trade zone by 2020, and transform the entire island into a free trade port by 2025. This will involve inviting foreign and multi-national companies to set up their regional and international headquarters in Hainan. Goods and services would be subject to low or even no tariffs. The zone will become China's largest free trade zone, and the first trade port since 1949, when the People's Republic of China was founded. Part of the plan is to establish exchanges in commodities and carbon trading, international energy, and shipping. Emphasis will also be placed on the development of service industries including tourism, the Internet, healthcare, finance, as well as conference and exhibitions hosting.

Since the announcement in April 2018, Hainan had signed 159 contracts with major companies. In September 2018, China National Travel Service Group, China's biggest travel business conglomerate, relocated its headquarters from Beijing to Haikou. In October 2018, Baidu and Hainan signed a deal to build a 10-billion-yuan (US$1.45 billion) eco-village.

In September 2018, a symposium was held in Beijing on foreign investment projects in Hainan. During that gathering, the Hainan government signed contracts with 26 international companies including Globevisa Group, Merlin Entertainments Group, Viacom, Ikea Group, Mapletree Investments, Avis Budget Group, Star Cruises, and Boehringer Ingelheim.

To bring talented workers to Hainan, in November 2018 the Hainan government held a recruitment fair in Beijing in an effort to bring 7,471 people to Hainan to work in government agencies, companies, and other institutions.

Established prior to this announcement, and currently in existence, are the following economic and technological development zones:

- Haikou Free Trade Zone
- Haikou New & Hi-Tech Industrial Development Zone
- Yangpu Economic Development Zone

In June 2020, China set the corporate income tax rate for Hainan Free Trade port enterprises engaged in specified manufacturing activities. In 2021, Hainan Free Trade Port Law of the People's Republic of China was adopted by the National People's Congress and ratified under the No.85 Order of the President of China in 2021. On 18 December 2018, feng guan (封关, which is directly translated into "customs closure") was implemented, making Hainan a separate customs zone. All goods sold to other parts of China from Hainan are treated as imports, in a similar way as Hong Kong SAR.

== Transport ==
=== Road ===
Before 1950 there were practically no transport links with the interior of the island. The first roads were built in the early 20th century, but no major road construction was undertaken in the mountains until the 1950s. Parallel north–south roads along the east and west coasts and through the interior of the island constitute most of Hainan's road network.

Hainan is the only province in China that does not have highway toll stations. This is due to the 1994 "fee-to-tax" reform. Instead, road maintenance costs are raised through a 60% tax on fuel.

There are several major highways and expressways linking Haikou on the north coast with Sanya on the south coast. The G224 is 309 kilometers long and runs through the middle of the province. The Hainan Ring Highway has three parts: The G225 is 429 km (267 mi) long and is the western part. For most of its length, the G225 runs parallel to the Hainan western ring railway. The G223 is the eastern part, running from Haikou to Sanya. It is 323 kilometers long. The G98 is a 612.8-kilometer-long orbital expressway that encircles the island. Hainan Highway 1, a new 1,040-km-long scenic highway, will be built around the island, along the coast starting in May 2019.

There are also numerous rural roads within the province. These are typically two-way asphalt roads and connect larger towns. Connecting the thousands of villages to one another and to farms, are concrete roads about 6 meters wide. Many of these were built from roughly from the year 2000 onward, and as of 2019, are still being built.

=== Bridges ===
While a bridge connecting Hainan to the Leizhou peninsula on the mainland was planned in the early 2000s it never came to fruition. A bridge or tunnel received continued consideration in 2018, as travel by air or ferry can leave residents and visitors isolated when bad weather sets in.

=== Air ===
Hainan Province has two international airports (Haikou Meilan International Airport and Sanya Phoenix International Airport) and two domestic airports (Qionghai Bo'ao Airport and Danzhou Airport, the latter is under construction.)

=== Rail ===
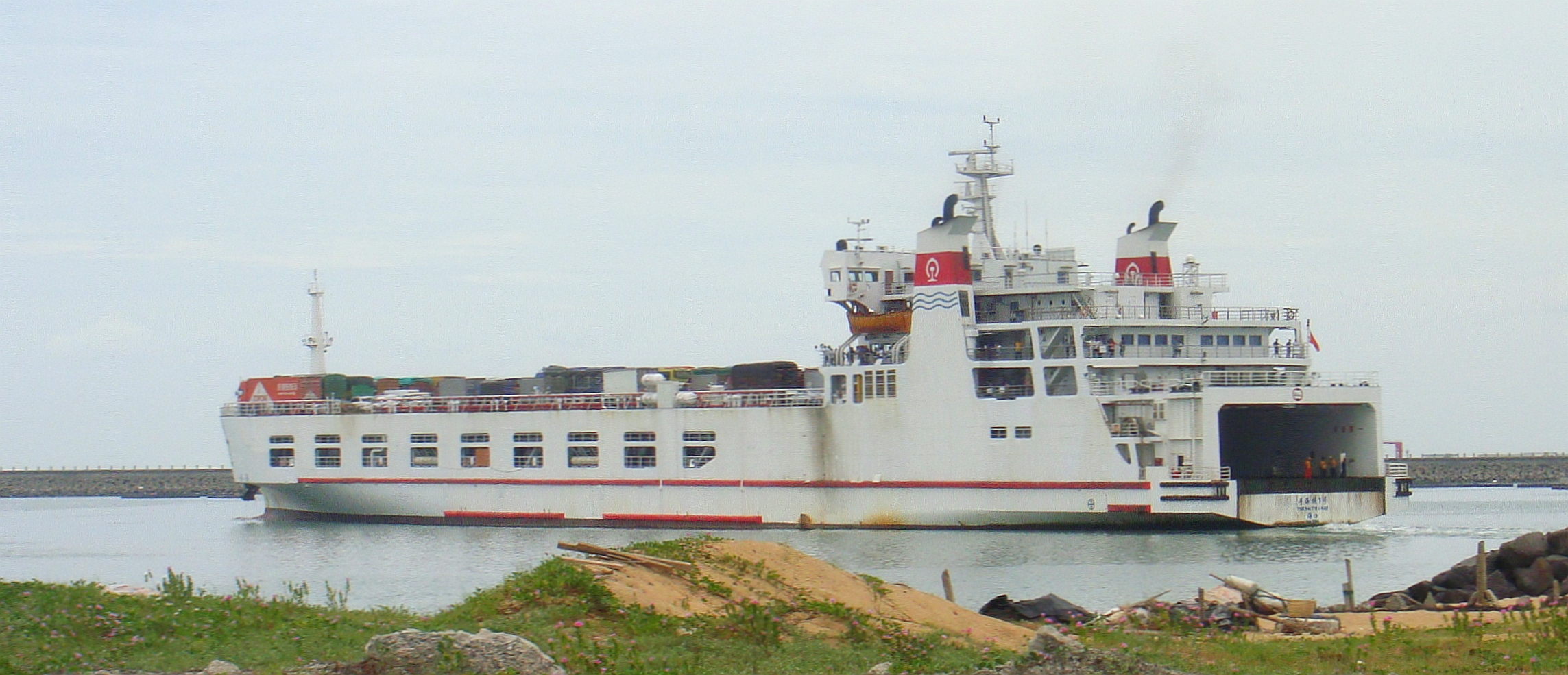
Train ferry of Guangdong–Hainan railway leaving South Port, Haikou

Today's Hainan is ringed by standard-gauge railways. Since 2004, a rail ferry connects the island's railroad network to Guangdong, mainland China. In 2005, Ministry of Communications allocated 20 million yuan (US$2.4 million) to set up a committee to research and study the possibility of a bridge or tunnel link connecting the island to the mainland. From the ferry terminal, located near Haikou railway station (west of Haikou), freight and passenger trains arriving from the mainland can proceed on the Hainan western ring railway along the island's west coast, via Dongfang to Sanya. This railway line has been developed over several decades, starting with a few short 3 ft 6 in (1,067 mm) narrow gauge lines constructed during the Japanese occupation in the early 1940s.

There is a high-speed railway ring around the island, formed by the eastern ring and western ring along the island's coast. Both high-speed railways are connected with Haikou and Sanya. There are 15 stations along the east coast, and 16 stations along the west coast. Trains are designed to travel at 250 km/h (160 mph) on the east ring, and 200 km/h (120 mph) on the west ring. The total length of eastern ring is 308.11 km (191.45 mi), while the western ring is 344 kilometers (214 mi). The first eastern ring high-speed train run started on 30 December 2010, and the Hainan western ring high-speed railway started its operation in 2015.

=== Seaports ===
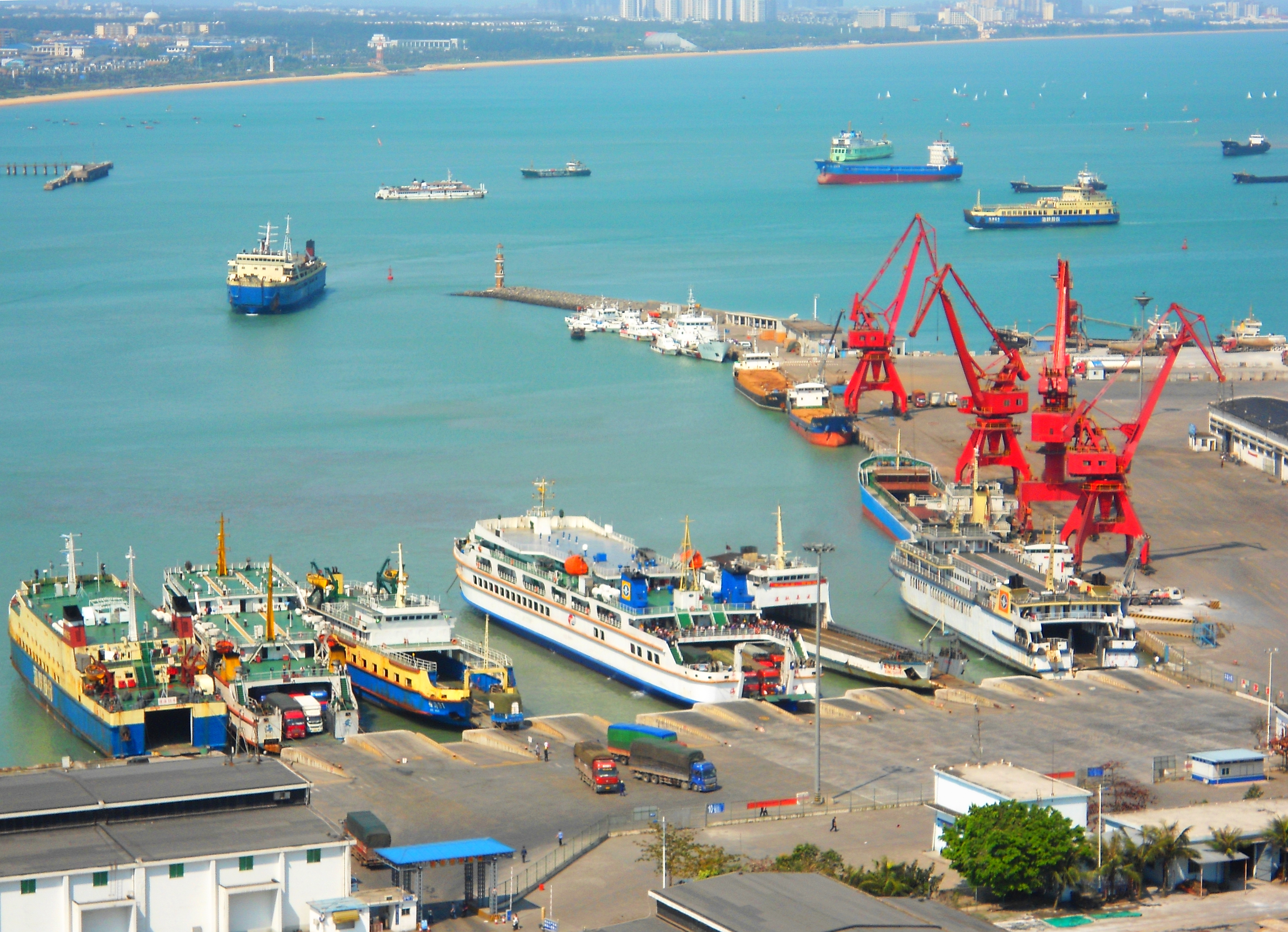
Haikou Xiuying Port

- Haikou Xiuying Port (海口秀英港) serves as the main passenger and cargo center.
- Haikou New Port (海口新港) opened 1 June 2005
- Macun Port (馬村港) located in Chengmai County; opened 1 June 2005
- Hainan Strait Port
- Basuo Port in Dongfang City is a small port on the west coast of Hainan. One of its main cargos is iron ore from the Shilu Mine.

Hainan received 11,000 tons of products via ports November 2010, up 90.1 percent month-on-month. Between January and November 2010, 102,000 tons of products were exported via Hainan, 34,000 tons of which were exported to the US, and 14,000 tons sent to the EU.

==== Province-wide infrastructure development ====
From 2015 to the present, a widespread program to improve cities and other settlements in Hainan island has been taking place. It includes the removal of litter from towns, villages, and many roadsides. Small, illegal dumps are being removed. However, illegal dumping of construction debris still occurs on rural roads. Large, plastic dumpsters have been put in place within villages and at countryside road intersections. Towns are being improved with new road and sidewalk surfaces, landscaping features are being created, and many buildings are receiving new façades.

This initiative in Haikou has seen entire neighborhoods demolished and rebuilt, sanitation improved, illegal structures used for business removed, roadside vendors banned, roads and sidewalks replaced, and new street crossings with traffic lights installed.

=== Space center ===
One of China's satellite launch centers is located in Hainan east of the city of Wenchang. The Wenchang Space Launch Site, a 1,200 hectares (3,000 acres) facility, is the closest Chinese launch center to the equator. The construction plan was first announced in October 2007. The new launch center began operations on 25 June 2016 with the Long March 7 rocket making its maiden flight.

== Visa-free entry ==
Starting from 1 May 2018, citizens of the following 59 countries do not need a visa if they visit Hainan Island and stay no more than 30 days. In July 2019, the Chinese Ministry of Public Security and National Immigration Administration announced an update and expansion of the visa-free entry options for foreign nationals in Hainan. In addition to the existing visa-free entry for tourists from 59 countries, foreign nationals are now allowed visa-free entry for various purposes, including business, trade, visiting, family reunification, medical treatment, conferences and exhibitions, sports competitions, and more (excluding work and study). Moreover, the Chinese Ministry of Public Security and National Immigration Administration has extended the visa-free entry into Hainan by allowing individual self-application or entry through an entity invitation, replacing the previous invitation reception mode that involved travel agencies.

=== Eligible countries ===
- European Union member states^{*}
- Albania^{*}
- Argentina^{*}
- Australia^{*}
- Belarus^{*}
- Bosnia and Herzegovina^{*}
- Brazil^{*}
- Brunei^{*}
- Canada^{*}
- Chile^{*}
- Iceland^{*}
- Indonesia
- Japan^{*}
- Kazakhstan^{*}
- Kyrgyzstan
- Malaysia^{*}
- Mexico
- Monaco^{*}
- Montenegro^{*}
- New Zealand^{*}
- North Macedonia^{*}
- Norway^{*}
- Philippines
- Qatar^{*}
- Russia^{*}
- Serbia^{*}
- Singapore^{*}
- South Korea^{*}
- Switzerland^{*}
- Thailand^{*}
- Ukraine
- United Arab Emirates^{*}
- United Kingdom^{*1}
- United States
- Vietnam

_{* – Visa-exempt in general (except nationals of the Czech Republic and Lithuania, who are visa-exempt only for Hainan).}

_{1 – For British citizens only.}

== Free trade zone ==
In July 2019, the Chinese Ministry of Public Security and National Immigration Administration announced updated preferential policies that applied to the Hainan Free Trade Port, a designation that refers to the entire island as a special economic development area and free-trade zone. It is the largest special economic zone in the People's Republic of China (PRC).Hainan Province (Hainan Free Trade Zone).

Foreign students who have obtained a master's or higher degree from Chinese universities can apply for a residency permit of up to 2 years for innovation and entrepreneurship in Hainan with the recommendation of their affiliated universities. Foreign students studying at overseas universities are allowed to engage in regular internships at Hainan's star-rated hotels, hospitals, international schools, and other entities. With the required invitation letter from the relevant entity and proof of enrollment at a foreign university, they can apply for the necessary visas for their internships.

Chinese of foreign nationalities with a Ph.D. degree working in Hainan, or Chinese of foreign nationalities who have worked continuously in Hainan for at least 4 years with an accumulated residency of no less than 6 months each year, are eligible to apply for permanent residency. Their foreign spouses and minor children can also apply for permanent residency together. Foreign individuals who invest in innovative enterprises in Hainan and maintain stable investments with good tax records for three consecutive years, recommended by the Hainan Provincial People's Government, can apply for permanent residency. Foreign individuals who have worked continuously in Hainan for 4 years and meet the income and personal income tax payment standards in Hainan are eligible to apply for permanent residency.

== Education ==
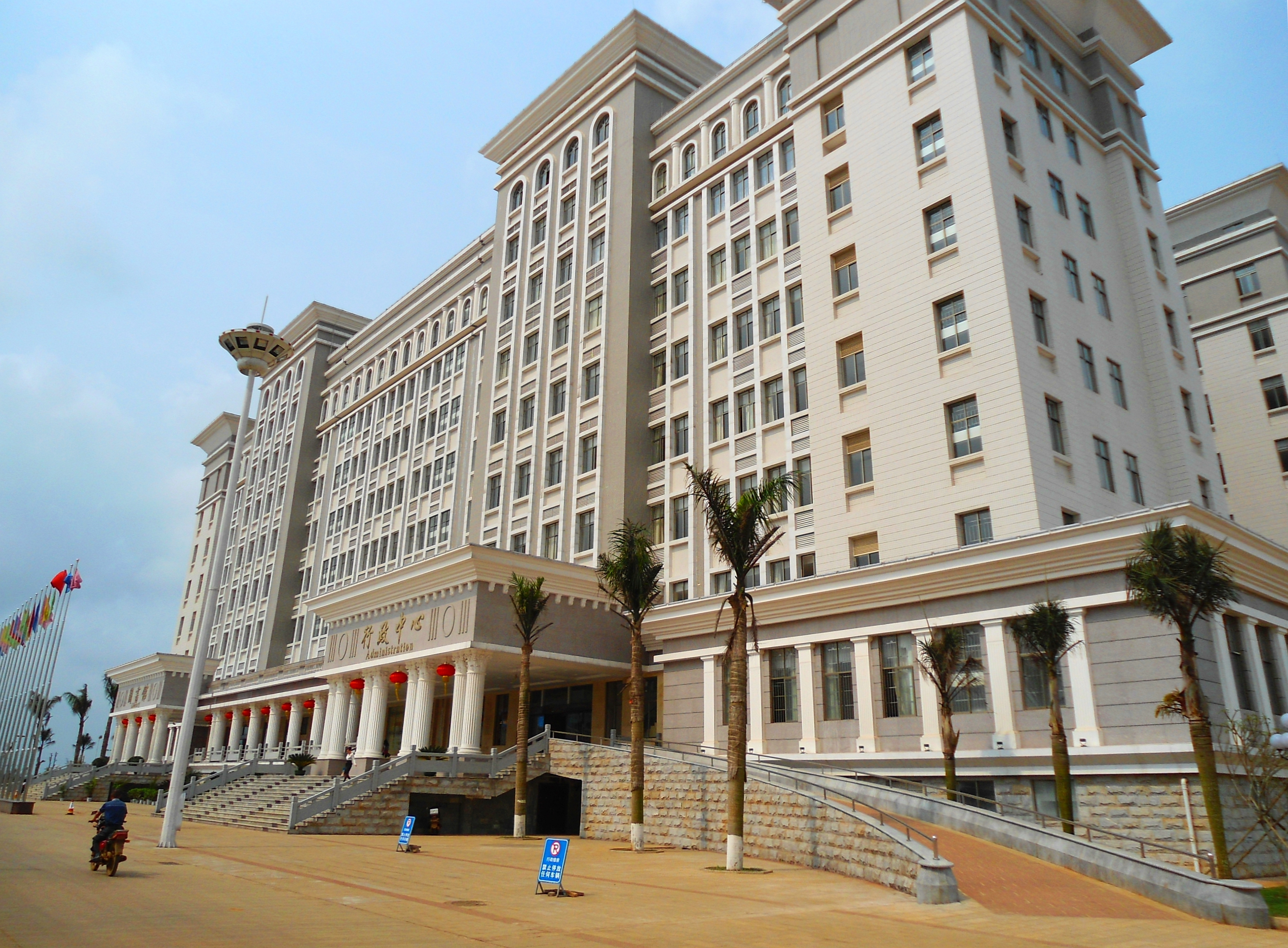
Haikou University of Economics, Guilinyang campus

The level of primary and secondary education has improved since 1949. However, facilities for higher education remain somewhat inadequate. Nonetheless, there are still a number of post-secondary schools in Hainan. They include:

- Hainan University (海南大学)
- Hainan Medical University (海南医学院)
- Hainan Normal University (海南师范大学)
- Hainan Tropical Ocean University (海南热带海洋学院)
- Qiongtai Normal University (琼台师范学院)
- Haikou University of Economics (海口经济学院)
- University of Sanya (三亚学院)

== Settlement ==
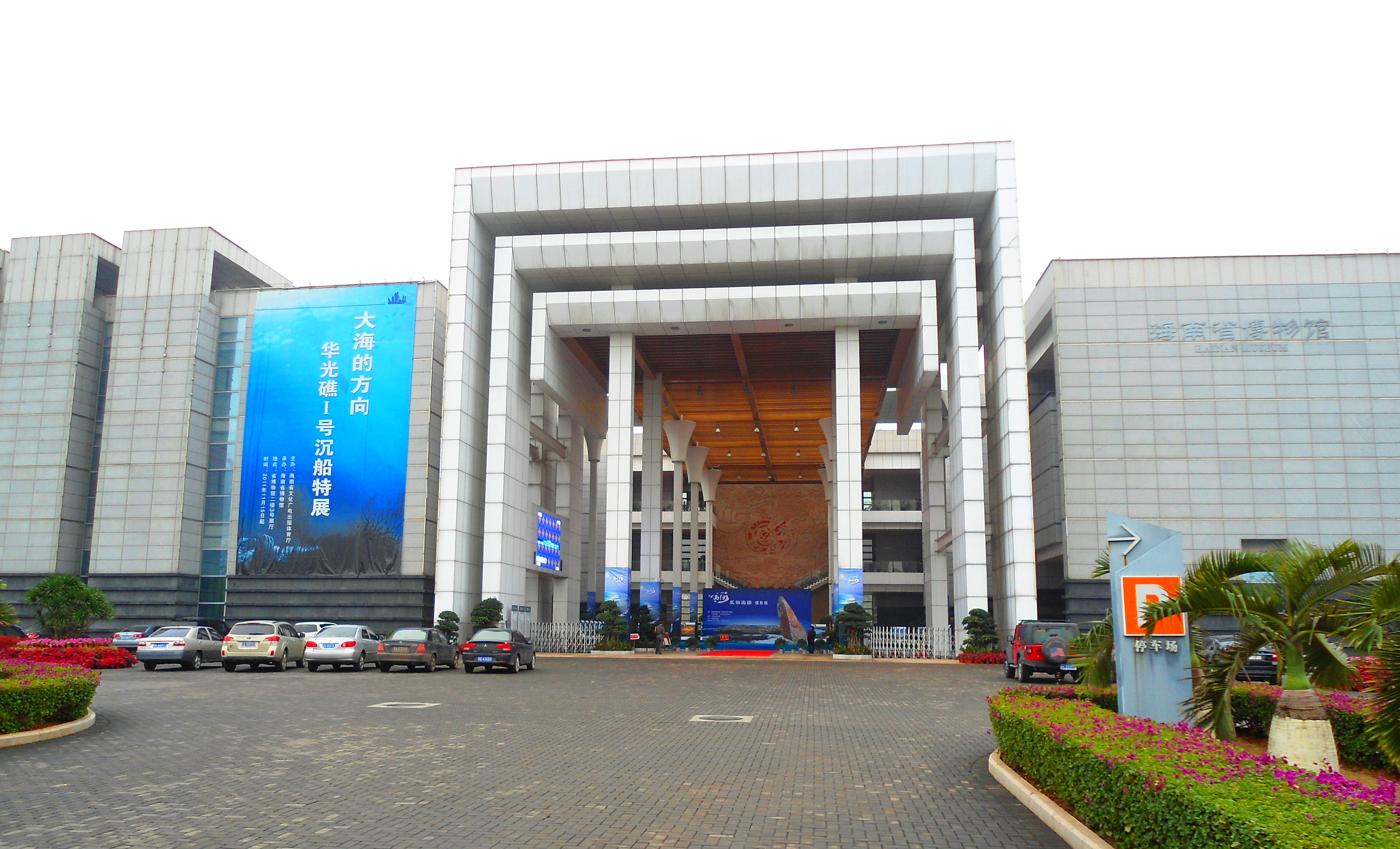
Hainan Provincial Museum

As a frontier region celebrated by such exiled poets as Su Dongpo, Hainan acquired an air of mystery and romance. The influx of large numbers of mainlanders after 1950 – particularly in the 1970s, when young Chinese from southern Guangdong were assigned to state farms to help develop Hainan, and in the 1980s, when thousands more came to take advantage of the economic opportunities offered – has perpetuated the frontier atmosphere on the island.

In the late 1960s, the influx of sent-down youths (primarily from Guangdong) to Hainan island led to the use of the phrase, "being rooted in Hainan" to refer to commitment to the revolutionary cause. By the early 1970s, the meaning of the phrase had evolved to refer to getting married and starting a family on the island.

== Media ==
As well as programs from Central China Television (CCTV), Hainan has a number of local TV stations including Hainan TV and Haikou TV. The Chinese language Nanguo Metropolis Daily, Haikou Evening News, and Hainan Daily newspapers are published in Haikou.

A large film studio is located in the south part of Haikou. Movie Town Haikou comprises several studio buildings and an artificial town used as filming sets and a visitor attraction.

== Cuisine ==
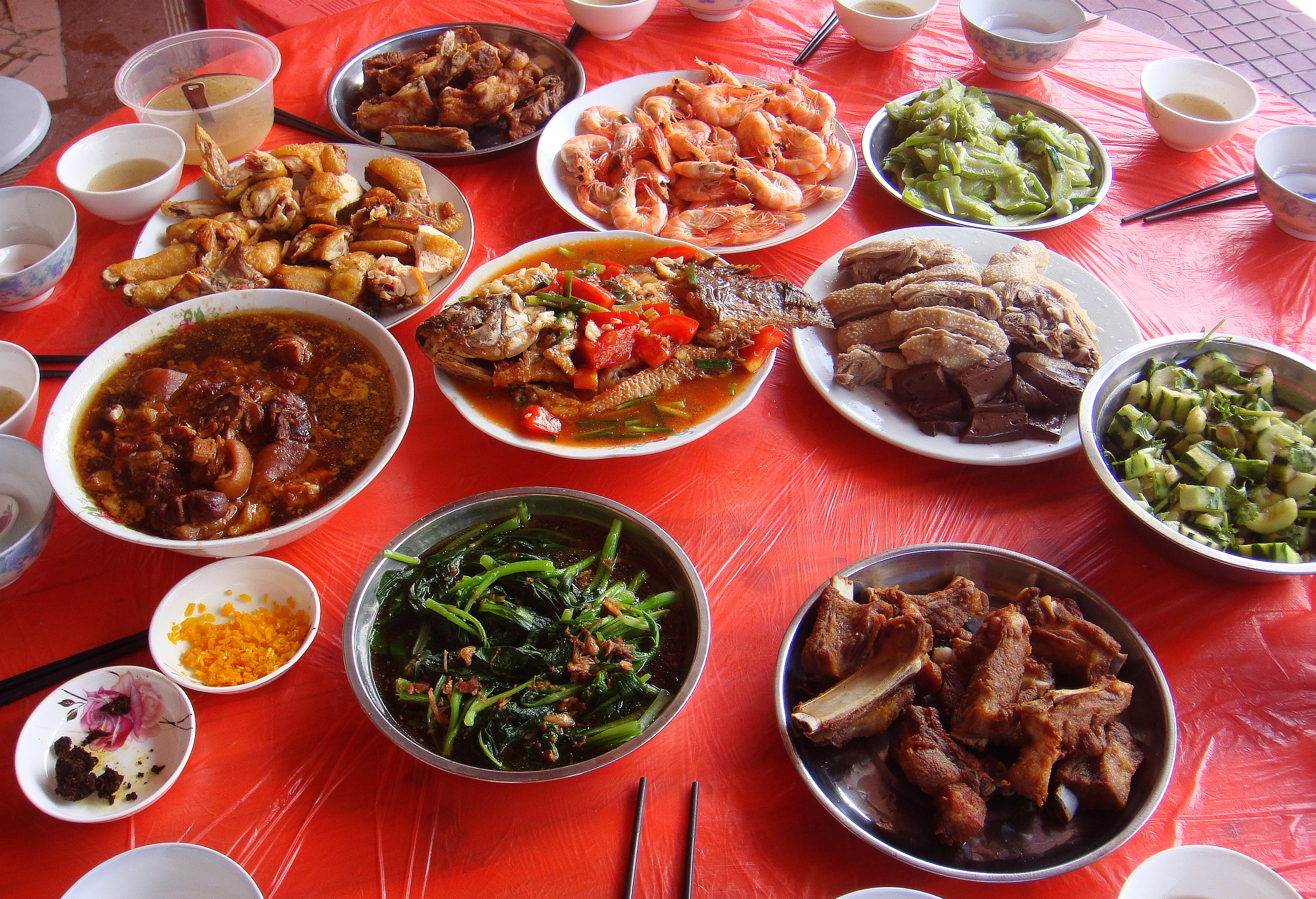
Common dishes served in Hainan

Hainan cuisine is said to be "lighter, with mild seasonings." A lot of local taste is mixed with the Han Chinese taste. Seafood predominates the menu, as shrimp, crab, fish and other sea life are widely available. Four notable dishes in Hainan Island are Wenchang Chicken, Dongshan Goat, Jiaji Duck and Hele Crab.

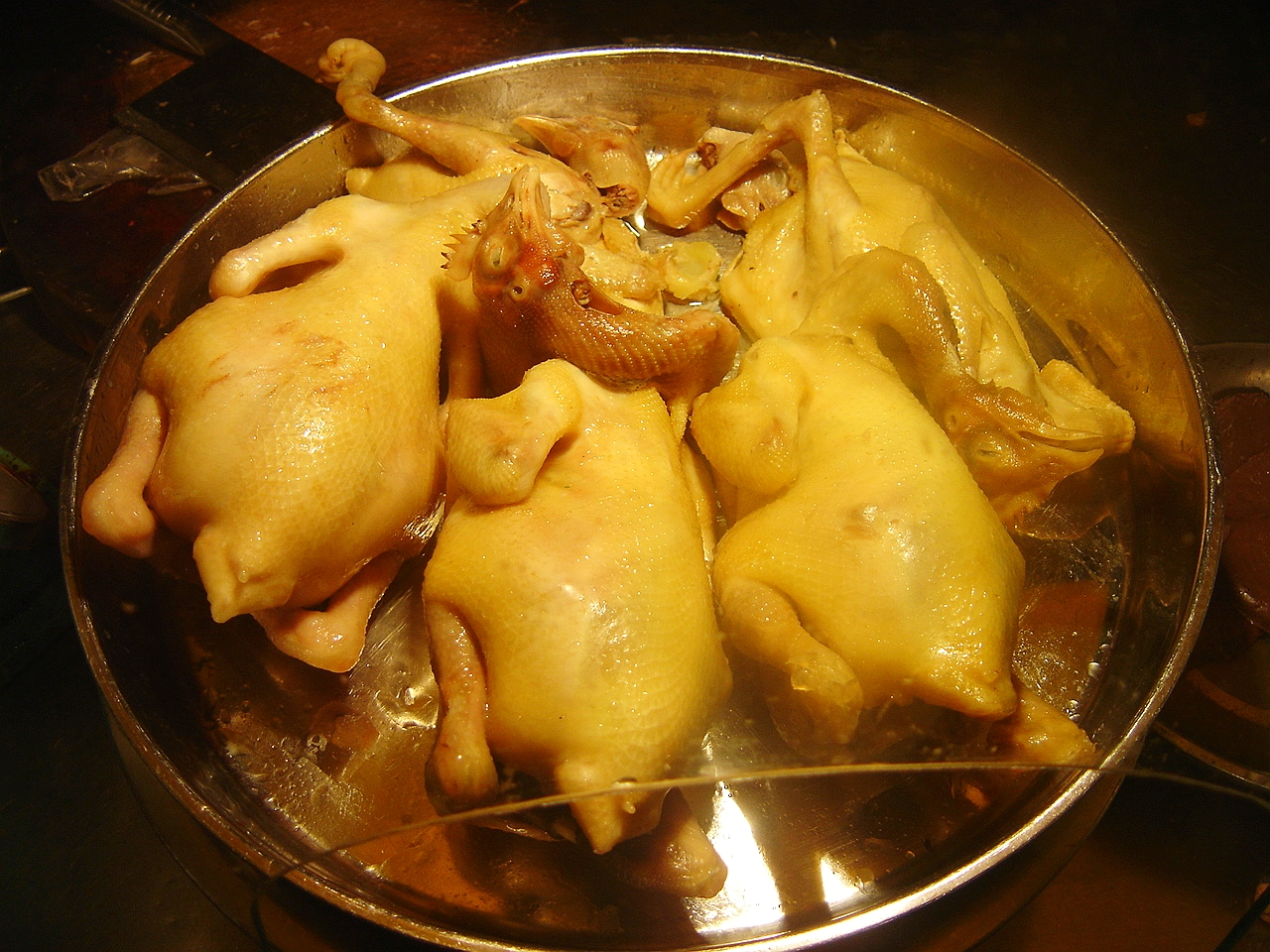
Wenchang chicken

Wenchang chicken is a dish known throughout the province of Hainan. Although there are many varieties of this dish, the name is usually used to define a type of small, free-range chicken from Wenchang, located on the east coast of the province. As opposed to battery chickens, its meat has more texture and is somewhat drier.

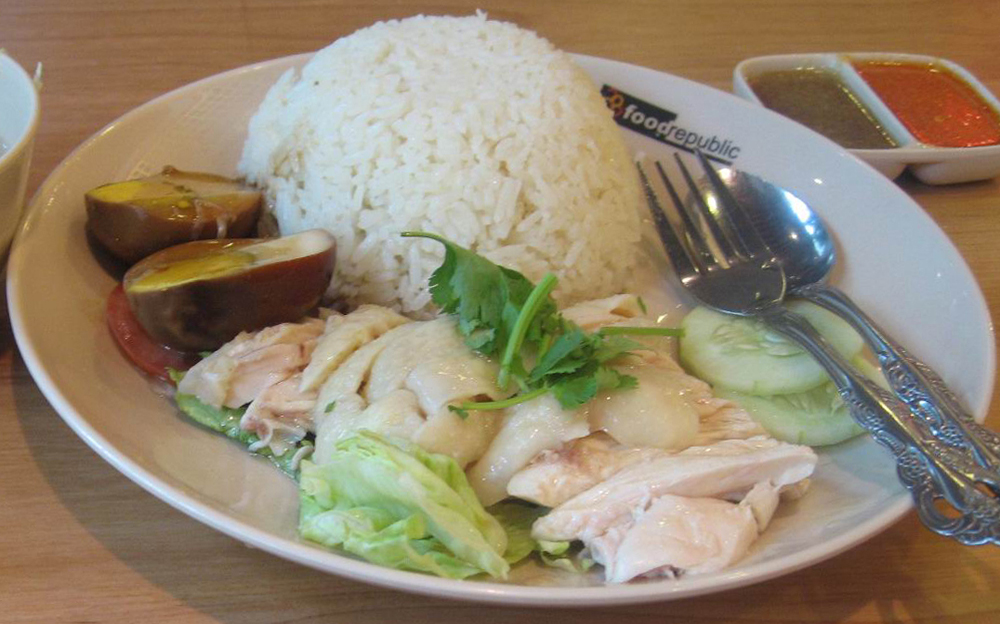
Hainanese chicken rice

Hainan chicken rice / Coibui is a famous dish in Southeast Asia, particularly Singapore and Malaysia, bearing the region's name. However, while many restaurants use chicken fat to quickly add flavor to the dish, the proper local method is to 'marinate' the rice with chicken soup to add a more full flavor.

Qingbuliang is also one of the most classic desserts in Hainan. It is similar to chilled sugar water and often contains coconut milk, red beans, watermelon, barley and other ingredients.

== Events ==
Numerous events are hosted or sponsored on the island, including:

- Blue Bay LPGA – Women's Golf LPGA tournament, held annually at Jian Lake Blue Bay Golf Course
- Swatch Girls World Pro China – Annual Elite Women's surfing competition, held at Wanning
- Hainan International Surfing Festival, held annually at Riyue Bay, Wanning
- Miss World beauty pageant is regularly held in the city of Sanya.
- Mission Hills Star Trophy is an annual golf tournament that started in 2010.
- Tour of Hainan bicycle race
- Hainan Rendez-Vous, an annual four-day event that draws China's ultra high-net-worth individuals to the Chinese Riviera-like shores of Hainan
- Boao Forum for Asia, held in Boao, is an international high-level government, business, and academia forum.
- H1 Hot Air Balloon Challenge is held annually in Haikou. Balloons from across the nation fly over the Qiongzhou Strait from Haikou to a designated location on the mainland in Xunwen County, Guangdong.

== Notable residents ==
The poet Su Shi (1036–1101) popularized Hainan's isolation and exoticism when he was exiled there under the Song dynasty. The Dongpo Academy was built on the site of the residence where he lived in exile.

Hai Rui (1514–1587) was a famous Chinese official of the Ming dynasty. His name has come down in history as a model of honesty and integrity in office.

Chih-Ping Chen (1906–1983) was a distinguished diplomat and statesman for the Republic of China, who served to build the Yunnan-Burma Road, and a diplomatic career that spanned four decades.

The most well-known native of Hainan is Chinese businessman Charlie Soong, father of the Shanghai-born Soong sisters: Soong Ai-ling, wife of H. H. Kung (once China's richest man); Soong Ching-ling, wife of Sun Yat-Sen; and Soong Mei-ling, wife of former ROC President Chiang Kai-shek.

Wang Feifei (Fei), singer, actress, entertainer and member of girl group Miss A, is from Haikou, a city in Hainan.

Wu Xuanyi, member of the South Korean-Chinese girl group WJSN, was born in Haikou, a city in Hainan.

== International partnerships ==
Hainan's sister states/provinces/cities include:

Sister state/province	Sovereign country	Date of Establishing Sisterhood Relationship
Hyogo	Japan	28 September 1990
Hawaii	United States	30 June 1992
Jeju	South Korea	6 October 1995
Crimea	Ukraine	15 April 1996
Cebu	Philippines	9 June 1996
Arad	Romania	27 September 2000
Salzburg	Austria	24 October 2000
Prince Edward Island	Canada	20 June 2001
South Sinai	Egypt	3 August 2002
Oulu	Finland	11 December 2002
Baleares	Spain	29 July 2004
Phuket	Thailand	25 September 2005
Southern Province	Sri Lanka	23 April 2005
Canary	Spain	11 November 2005
Lubuskie	Poland	24 February 2006
East New Britain	Papua New Guinea	28 September 2006
Kampong Cham	Cambodia	27 March 2006
Quang Ninh	Vietnam	19 April 2007
Quintana Roo	Mexico	30 September 2008
Kyzylorda	Kazakhstan	3 July 2009
Parana	Brazil	13 March 2010
Gotland	Sweden	2 November 2010
Sardinia	Italy	13 October 2011
Bali	Indonesia	20 October 2011
Nampula	Mozambique	18 September 2013
Penang	Malaysia	7 November 2013
South Moravian Region	Czech Republic	29 April 2016
Pest	Hungary	12 June 2016
Luang Prabang	Laos	16 July 2016

== See also ==
- Hainan Island incident
- List of islands of China
- Sanya

== Sources ==
- Murray, Jeremy A. (2017). China's Lonely Revolution: The Local Communist Movement of Hainan Island, 1926–1956. Albany, New York: State University of New York Press. ISBN 9781438465319.
