= Wang Zonghua =

- 王宗华
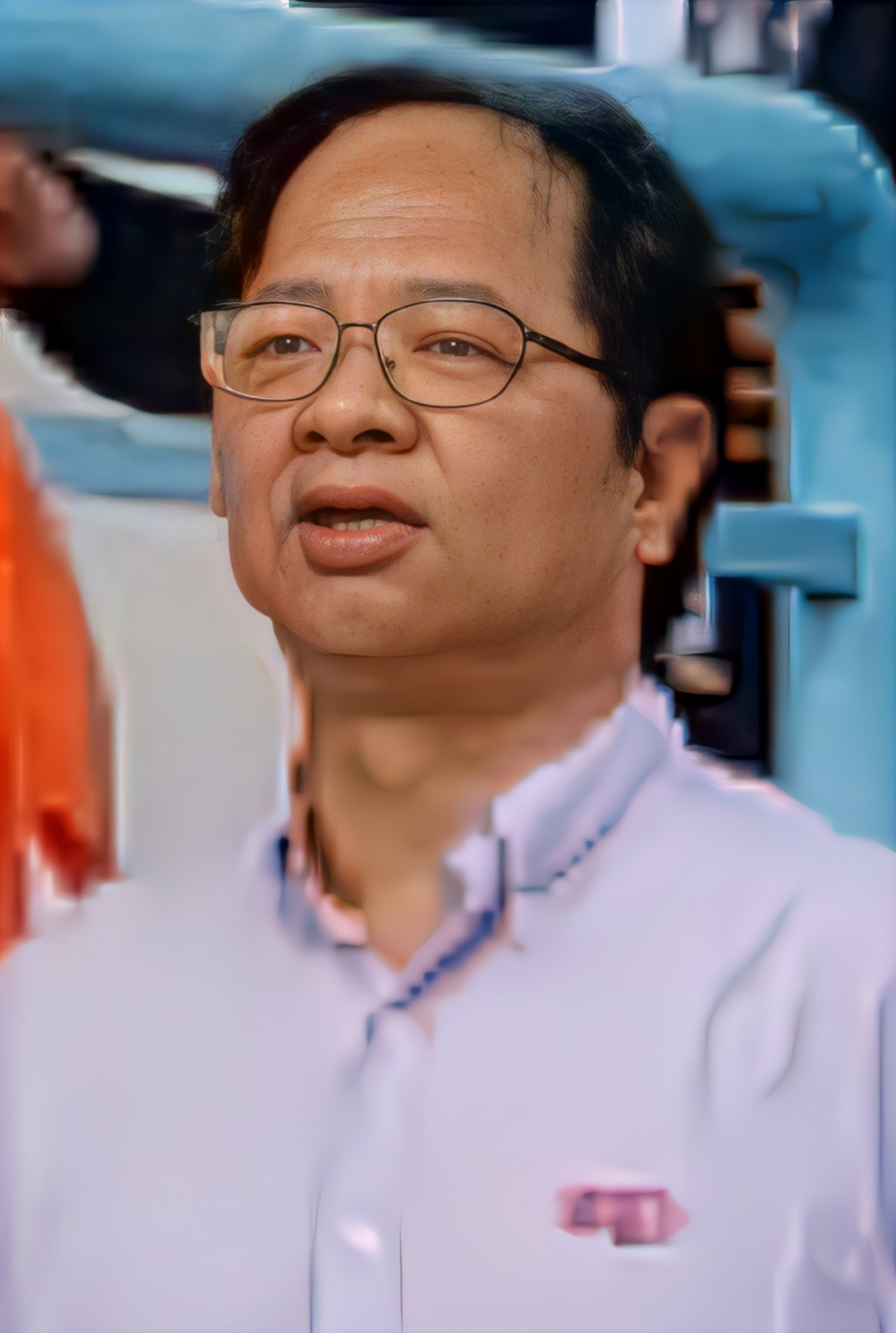
- Born: December 11, 1962 (age 63)

Wang Zonghua (Chinese: 王宗华; born 11 December 1962) is the president of Minjiang University in Fuzhou, Fujian, China.

== Biography ==
Wang graduated from South China University of Tropical Agriculture (now part of Hainan University), and earned his master's degree from Northwest Agricultural University and his Ph.D. from Fujian Agriculture and Forestry University. Since February 2017, he has held the post of the president of Minjiang University.
