= Liu Guodao =

Chinese researcher, professor and doctoral supervisor

Liu Guodao 刘国道
- Born: Tengchong, Yunnan, China
- Education: South China University of Tropical Agriculture
- Occupation: Agrobiologist
- Known for: Encyclopedia on tropical grasses in China

Liu Guodao (Chinese: 刘国道; born June 1963 in Tengchong, Yunnan), is a Chinese agrobiologist.

Liu is a researcher, professor and doctoral supervisor on tropical forage, specializing on the collection, identification, conservation and breeding of tropical forage grass genetic resources. Based in Haikou, Hainan, a tropical province of China, Liu is a vice-president of the Chinese Academy of Tropical Agricultural Sciences (CATAS), after having served as the head of two affiliated research institutes of the CATAS, the Tropical Crop Germplasm Research Institute and the Tropical Agricultural & Animal Husbandry Institute.

Liu has presided over 15 research programs, obtained 27 provincial and ministerial level awards in China and bred 24 species. Among the papers and books Liu published, he's the author of an encyclopedia on tropical grasses in China "Grasses of Hainan" (published in 2010 by Science Press of Chinese Academy of Sciences) which includes 98 genus, 242 species and 1723 photos of grasses into over 700 pages, an achievement of more than 20 years of researches.

Currently, on behalf of the CATAS, Liu is in charge of international cooperation, technical service and training for farmers in developing countries. In an interview published by a Chinese state-run newspaper China Daily in August 2018, Liu said "the CATAS has established long-term cooperation and exchange programs with more than 43 African countries, helping build demonstration centers of agricultural science and technology and training more than 2,300 local talent".

Liu graduated and obtained his doctorate from the South China University of Tropical Agriculture (now part of Hainan University). He was also a visiting scholar at International Center for Tropical Agriculture in Colombia.
