= Chuah Hean Teik =

Malaysian academic (born 1961)

Yang Berbahagia Tan Sri Dato' Seri Chuah Hean Teik PSM DGPN DSPN
- 蔡賢德

Former President and CEO of Universiti Tunku Abdul Rahman (UTAR)
- In office April 2008 – September 2019
- Succeeded by: Ewe Hong Tat

Consultant Professor of Northwestern Polytechnical University
- In office 2018–Present

University Advisor of University of Sanya
- In office 2020–Present

Personal details
- Born: 22 January 1961 (age 65) George Town, Penang, Federation of Malaya
- Citizenship: Malaysian
- Education: University of Malaya
- Occupation: Engineer; Scholar; Researcher; Industry Leader

Chinese name
- Simplified Chinese: 蔡贤德
- Traditional Chinese: 蔡賢德
Transcriptions
Standard Mandarin
- Hanyu Pinyin: Cài Xián Dé
Yue: Cantonese
- Jyutping: Coi3 Jin4 Dak1
Southern Min
- Hokkien POJ: Chhòa Hiân-tek
- Tâi-lô: Tshuà Hiân-tik

Chuah Hean Teik (Chinese: 蔡贤德; Pe̍h-ōe-jī: Chhòa Hiân-tek) is a Malaysian eminent scholar, researcher, academic and industry leader.

He has been the President and CEO of Universiti Tunku Abdul Rahman (UTAR), Malaysia from April 2008 until September 2019. He is currently the President of the Federation of Engineering Institutions of Asia and the Pacific (FEIAP) and strongly advocates mutual recognition of engineering degrees in Asia and the Pacific region by promoting the FEIAP Engineering Education guidelines.

He was named Fellow of the Institute of Electrical and Electronics Engineers (IEEE) in 2014 for leadership in Engineering education.

He is also a Consultant Professor to Northwestern Polytechnical University since 2018 and University Advisor for University of Sanya since 2020.

== History ==
On 10 April 2008, Universiti Tunku Abdul Rahman (UTAR) Council Chairman Ling Liong Sik has appointed him as its new president cum CEO to succeed Ng Lay Swee from 1 April 2008 onwards.

== Honours ==
- Malaysia
  - Commander of the Order of Loyalty to the Crown of Malaysia (PSM) – Tan Sri (2019)
- Penang
  - Commander of the Order of the Defender of State (DGPN) – Dato' Seri (2023)
  - Officer of the Order of the Defender of State (DSPN) – Dato' (2005)

=== Other Awards ===
- Balai Ikhtisas Malaysia (BIM) Lifetime Achievement Award
