= Xi Jinping in Fuzhou =

2020 Chinese Communist Party text

- Original title: 习近平在福州
- Language: Mandarin Chinese
- Genre: Biography
- Publisher: Central Party School Press
- Publication date: July 2020
- Publication place: China
- Media type: Print (Hardcover, Paperback)
- ISBN: 978-7-5035-6840-4

Xi Jinping in Fuzhou is a book written by the Interview Records Editorial Office of the Central Party School of the Chinese Communist Party and published by the Central Party School Press in July 2020. The book recreates a stage in the growth process of Xi Jinping, the current General Secretary of the Chinese Communist Party, during his tenure in Fuzhou, Fujian. It takes the form of an oral record by the narrator.

== Introduction ==
Xi Jinping in Fuzhou was published by the Central Party School in July 2020. It mainly tells about Xi Jinping's experiences and decision-making during his more than six years as Secretary of the CCP Fuzhou Municipal Committee.

Xi Jinping served in Fujian Province for nearly 18 years, of which he worked and lived in Fuzhou for more than 13 years. While serving as the Party Secretary of Fuzhou, Xi Jinping proposed the Fuzhou 3820 Project, which aimed to build Fuzhou into an international metropolis and a political, economic, cultural, educational and transportation center for Fujian Province and the West Coast Economic Zone of the Taiwan Strait. During Xi Jinping's tenure as the head of Fuzhou, the average annual GDP growth rate exceeded 20%, ranking second in the country in terms of average annual GDP growth rate. Xi also believed that there was a lack of a large city between the Yangtze River Delta and the Pearl River Delta, and that city was Fuzhou. Therefore, he proposed the slogan of surpassing Guangzhou. He also reported to the State Council and applied for Fuzhou to become a sub-provincial city. However, due to various reasons, this has not been realized so far. As a result, Fuzhou has become the only provincial capital in China whose city level is lower than other cities in the province.

When Xi Jinping was the party secretary of Fuzhou, he also built the Fuzhou Changle International Airport. He also served as the president of Minjiang University. At the end of his term, he reserved a fiscal surplus of 500 to 600 million yuan for the relocation of the Fuzhou Municipal Party Committee and Municipal Government, but for various reasons this has not been realized. Fuzhou International Investment Promotion Month, Fujian-Zhejiang-Jiangxi-Anhui Fuzhou Economic Cooperation Zone, Fuzhou Metropolitan Area, Maritime Fuzhou, Minjiang Estuary Golden Triangle, Modern International City, International Metropolis, these plans and constructions were all proposed, constructed and promoted by Xi Jinping when he was in charge of Fuzhou.

== Reactions ==
Xinhua News Agency said that Communist Party members can learn Xi Jinping's thoughts and comprehend great wisdom through this book. The Chinese state media stated that the book "triggered a buying and reading craze on its first day on the shelves."
