= Yiying Han =

Chinese professional esports player

Miss

Personal information
- Name: 韩懿莹 (Yiying Han)
- Born: 21 May 1988 (age 38); Neijiang, Sichuan
- Nationality: Chinese

Career information
- Games: Warcraft 3, StarCraft 2

Yiying Han (simplified Chinese: 韩懿莹; traditional Chinese: 韓懿瑩; born 21 May 1988), also known by her game ID Miss, is a Chinese Warcraft 3 professional player, StarCraft 2 professional player, LOL commentator and game host.

Han is from Neijiang, Sichuan. She began attending Hainan University in 2006, where she received a degree in accounting in 2010. She became active in e-sports in 2007. Han was named the "Most Popular League of Legends Commentator of 2015" (2015英雄联盟最受欢迎解说). During a May 2016 broadcast, she slept for 20 minutes during the intermission for a live League of Legends game. While she was sleeping, more people joined her stream to watch, peaking at almost 300,000 viewers.
