= Longhua District =

Longhua District may refer to the following districts in the People's Republic of China:

- Longhua District, Shenzhen (龙华区), in Shenzhen, Guangdong
- Longhua District, Haikou (龙华区), in Haikou, Hainan
