= Coconut Palm Group =

Chinese beverage company

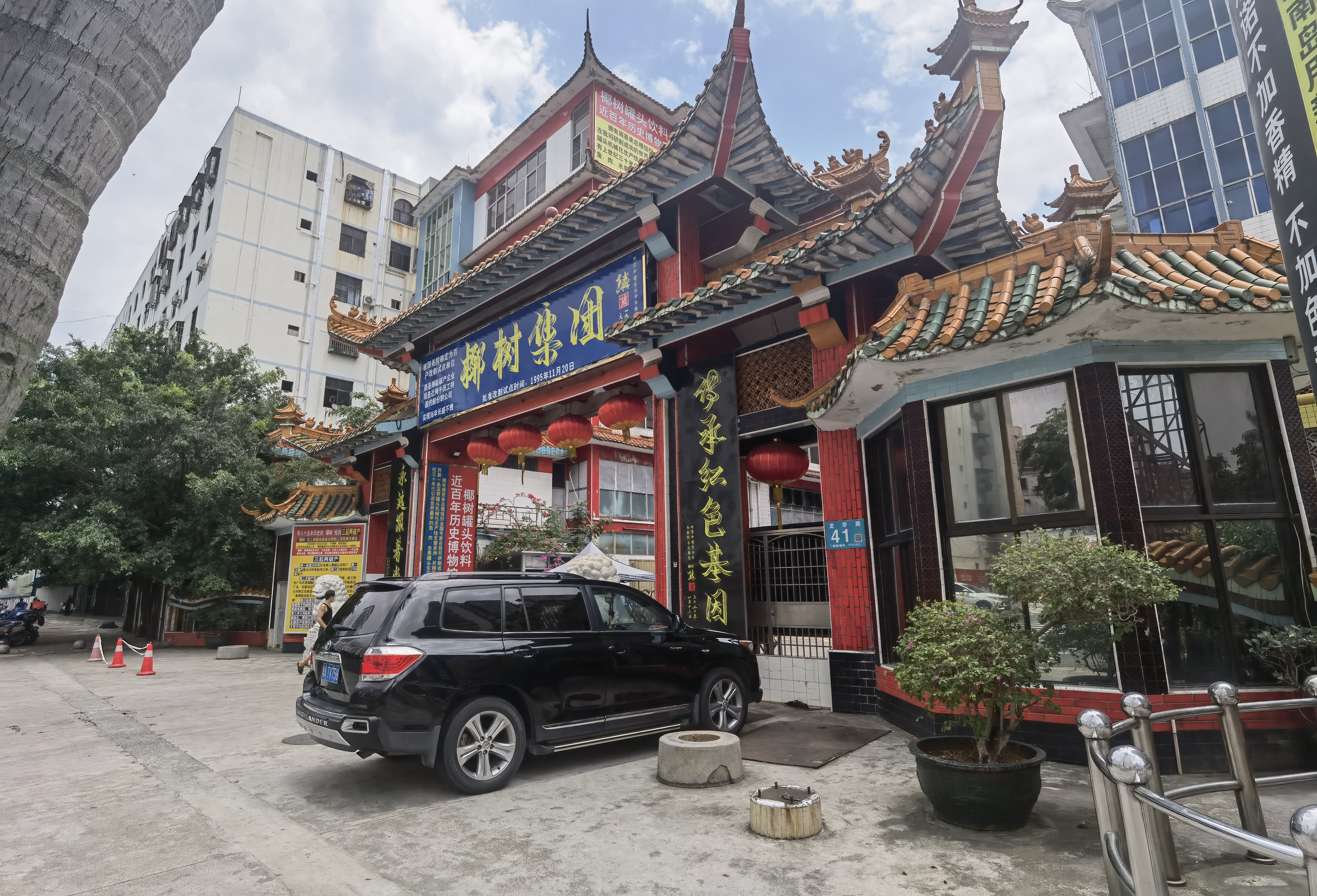
Main gate of Coconut Palm Group

Coconut Palm Group is a Chinese beverage company with headquarters in Longhua, Haikou in Hainan. The company specializes in coconut food products.

It has been frequently discussed in media for its controversial ads.
