= Shijian (disambiguation) =

Shijian is a series of satellites.

Shijian may also refer to:

== Places ==
- Shih Chien University, a private university in Taiwan
  - Dazhi metro station, or Shih Chien University station, a metro station of the Taipei Metro
- Shijian Town (石涧镇), a defunct town in Guangning County, Guangdong Province, China
- Shijian, Wuwei (石涧镇), a town in the county-level city of Wuwei, Anhui, China

== People ==
- Chu Shijian (1928–2019), Chinese business executive and entrepreneur
- Wang Shih-chien (born 1960), Taiwanese politician
- Zhao Shijian (born 1955), Chinese speed skater
- Zhong Shijian (born 1956), former Chinese politician
