= Haikou University of Economics =

Private college in Haikou, Hainan, China

- 海口经济学院
- Location: Haikou, Hainan, China
- Website: hkc.edu.cn

Chinese name
- Simplified Chinese: 海口经济学院
- Traditional Chinese: 海口經濟學院
Transcriptions
Standard Mandarin
- Hanyu Pinyin: Hǎikǒu Jīngjì Xuéyuàn

The Haikou University of Economics (Chinese: 海口经济学院; lit. 'Haikou Economics College'; formerly known as the Haikou Economics Vocational Technical College) is a privately owned and operated college in Haikou, Hainan, China. Despite its English name, the school has not been granted university status.

== Campuses ==
Haikou Campus

The main campus is located near Guoxing Road, in the southern part of Haikou city.

- Coordinates: 20.013899°N 110.365471°E

Guilinyang Campus

A new campus has opened while still under construction. It is located in Guilinyang, a town in Longhua District, east of the Nandu River.

- Coordinates: 19.9665°N 110.486431°E

== Gallery ==
Guilinyang Campus:

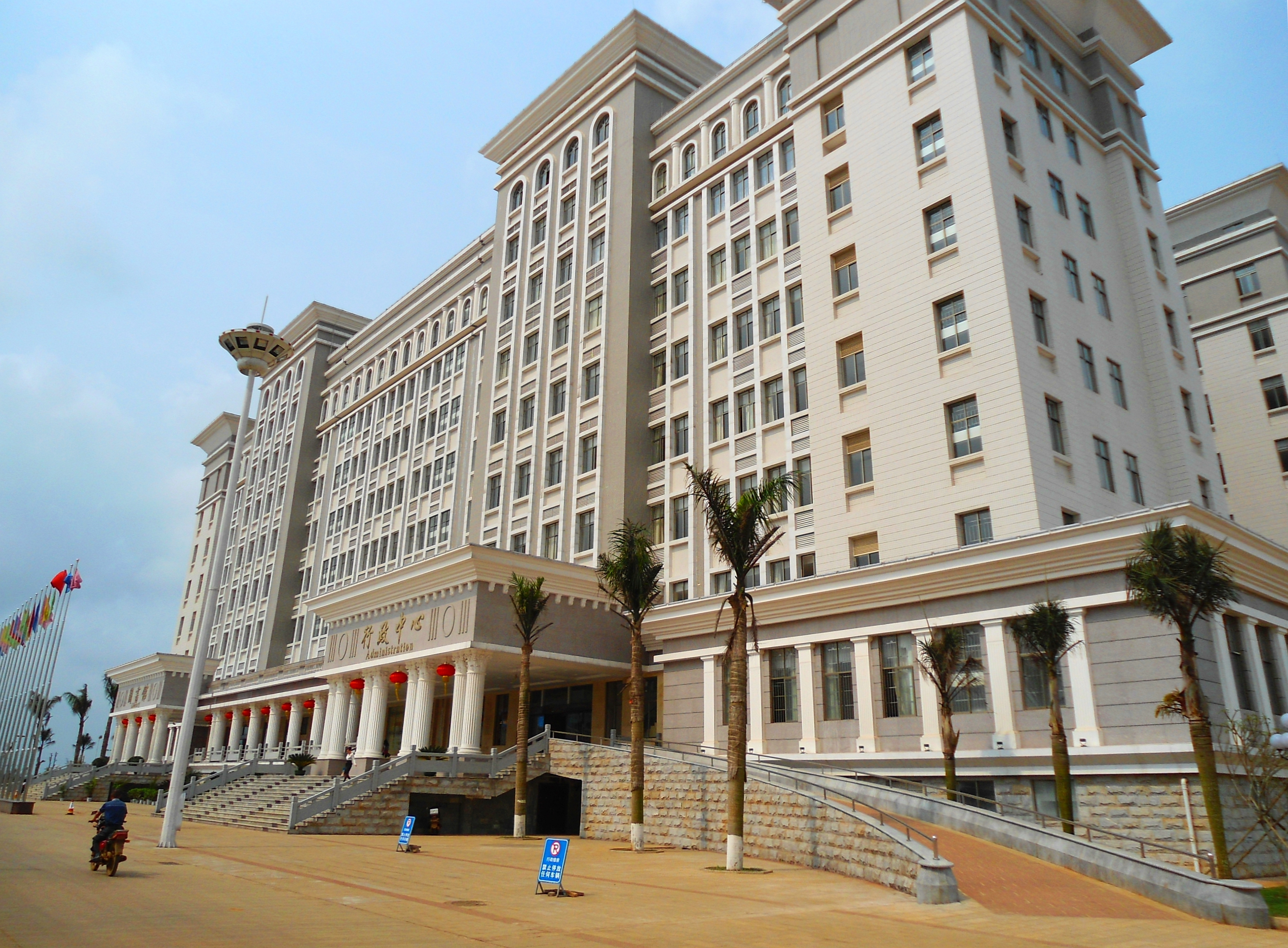
Main administration building

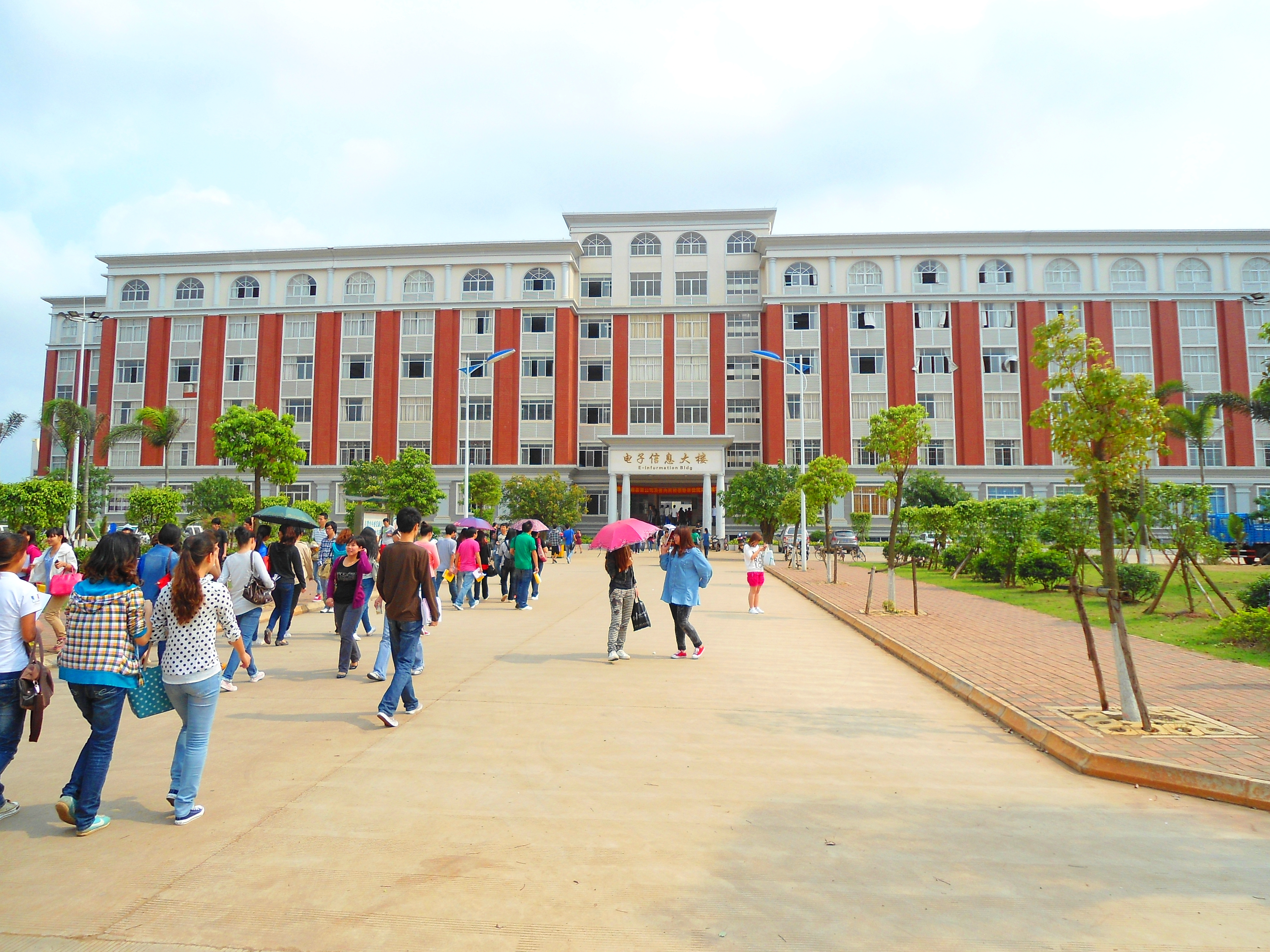
E-information building

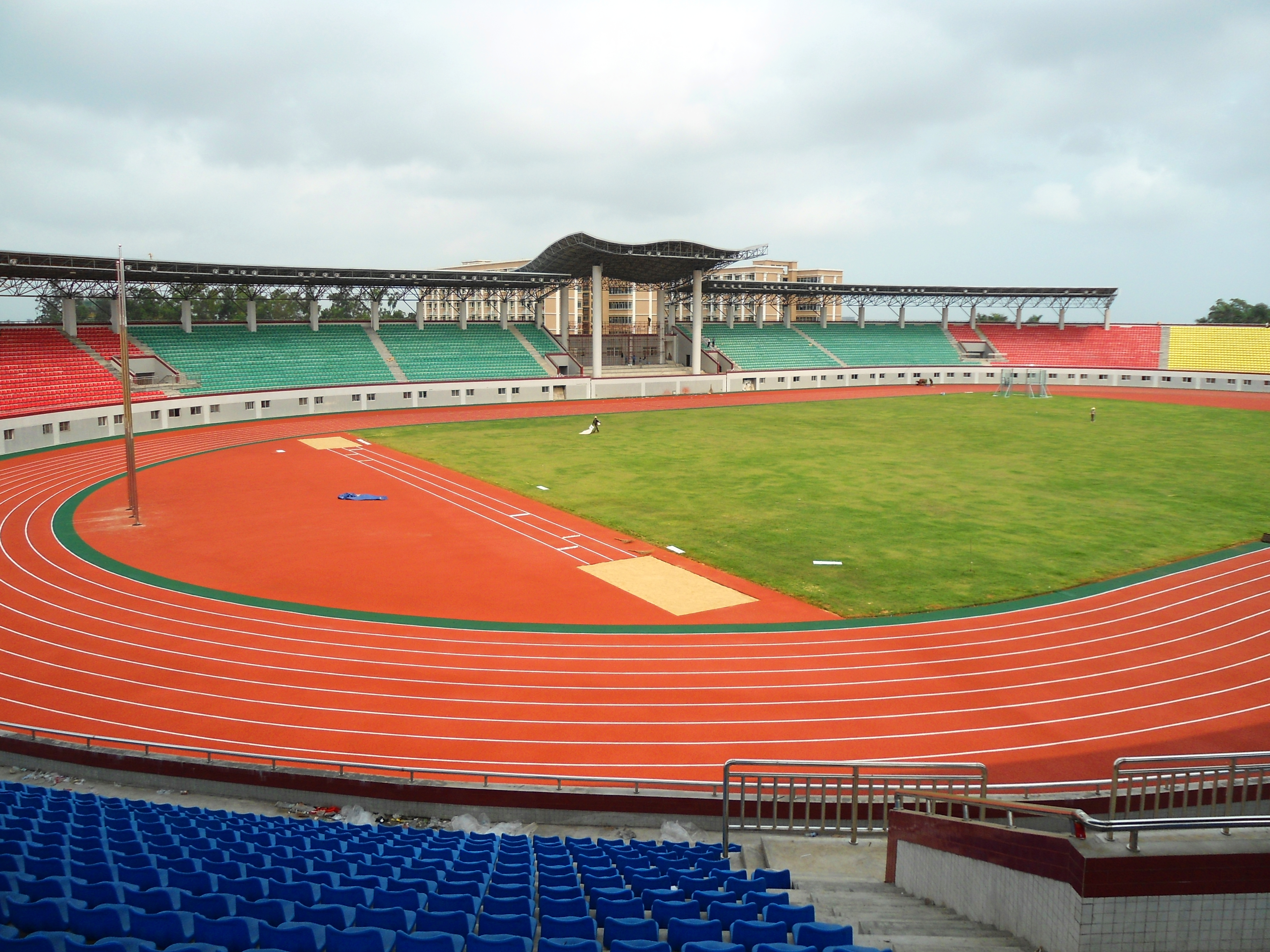
Sports arena

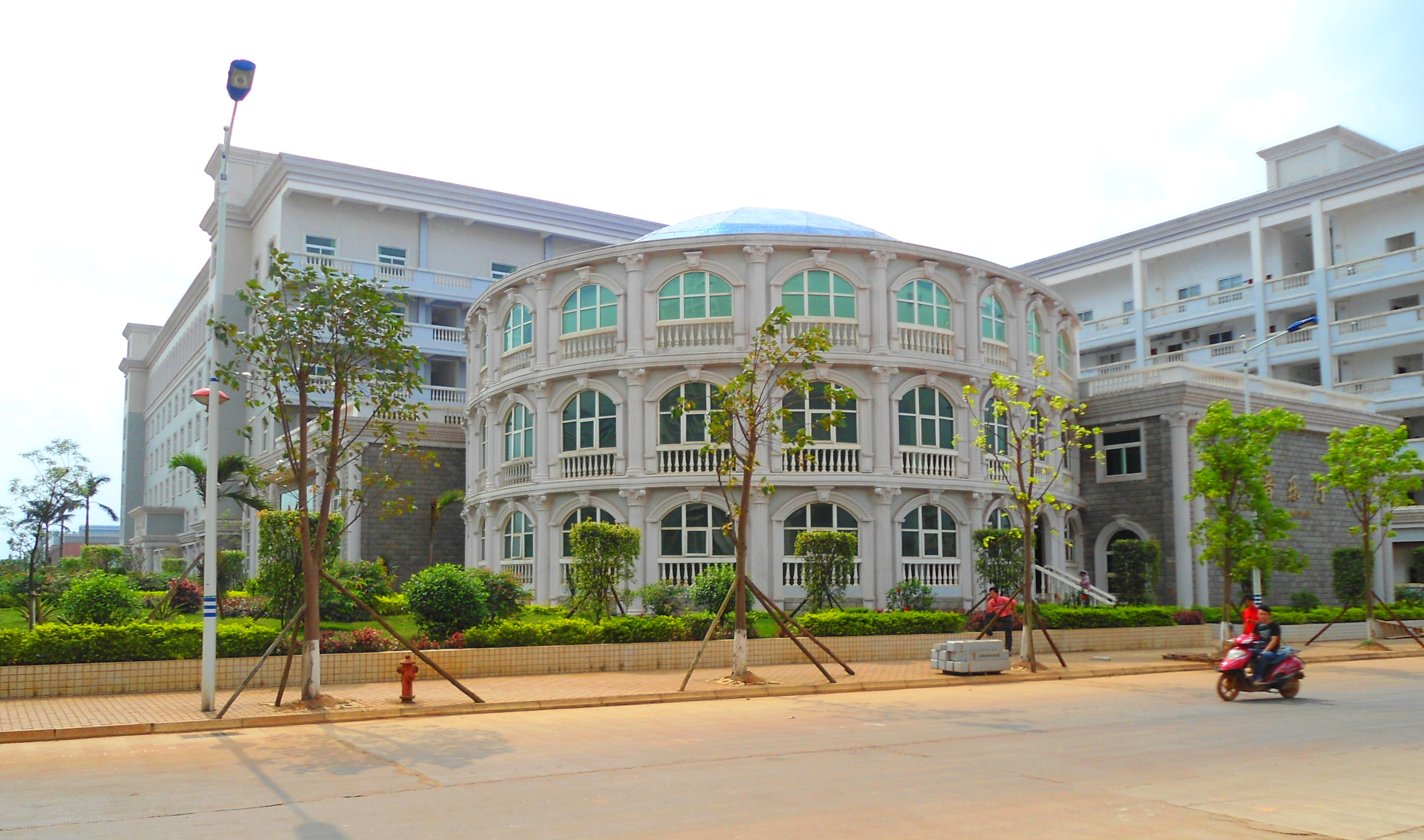
Concert hall

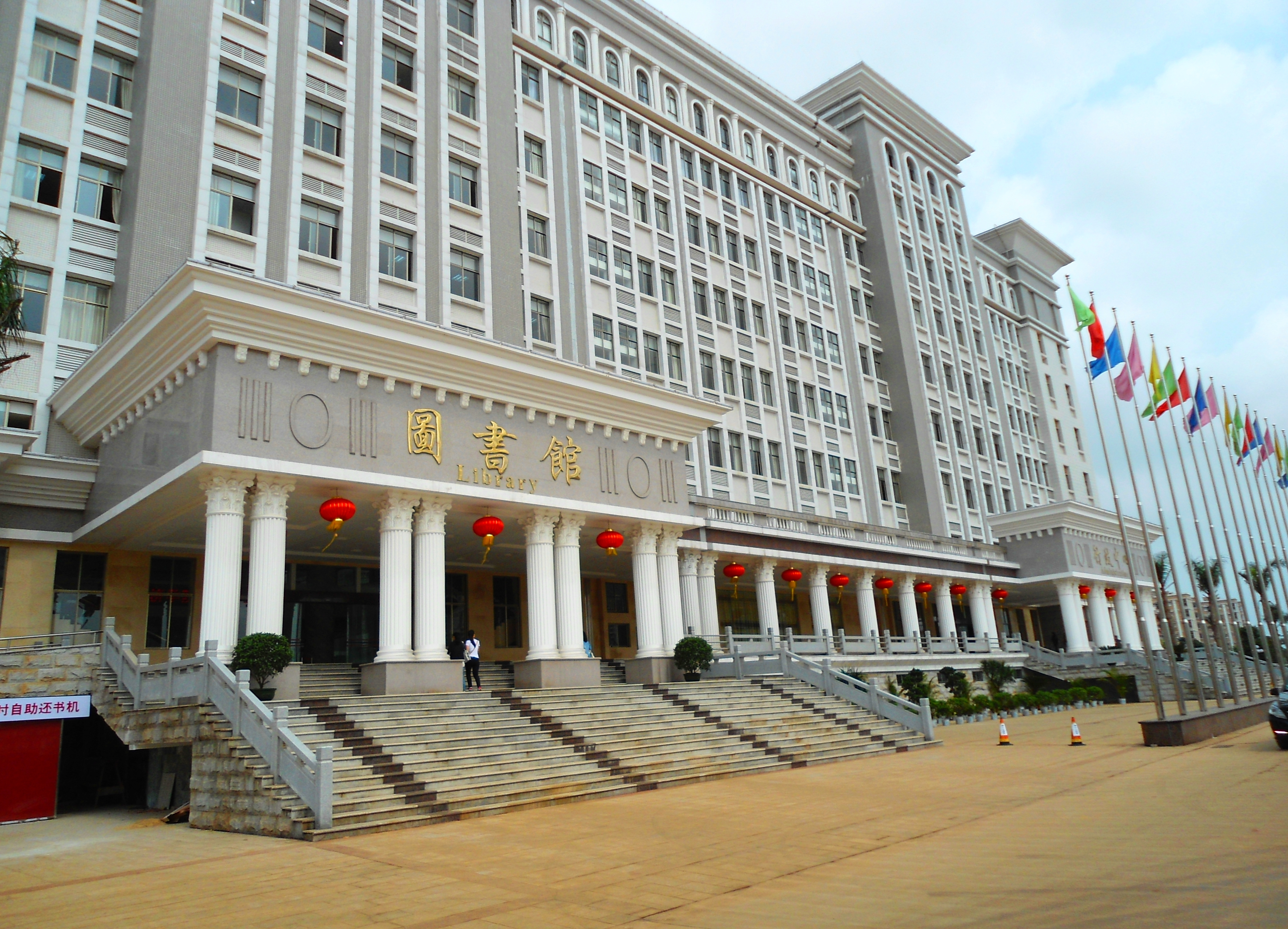
Administration and library building

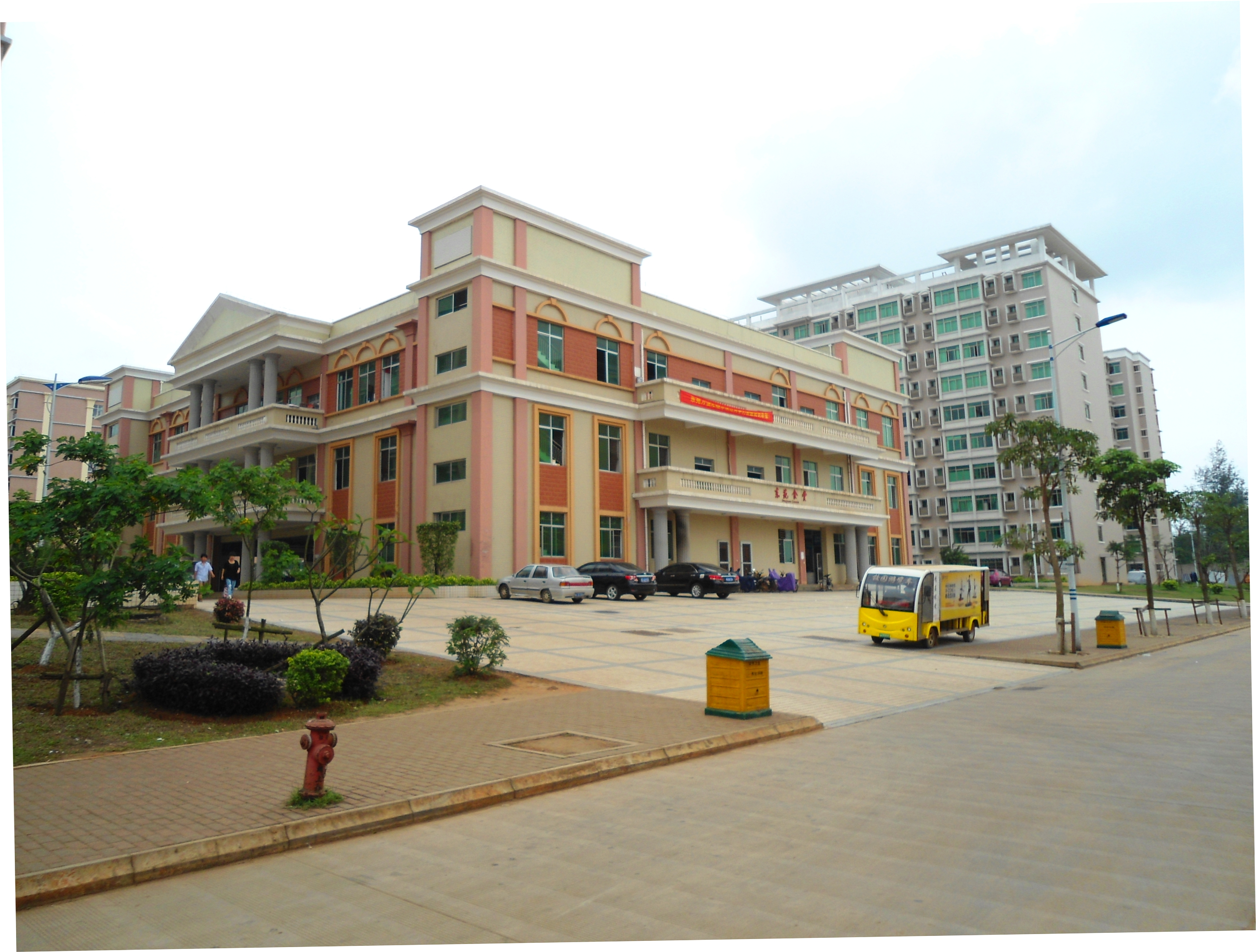
One of several canteens

== See also ==
- List of universities and colleges in Hainan
- List of universities in China
- Higher education in China
