= HMU =

HMU or Hmu may refer to:

== Universities ==
- Hainan Medical University, Haikou, Hainan, China
- Harbin Medical University, Heilongjiang, China
- Hanoi Medical University, Vietnam
- Hawler Medical University, Erbil, Iraqi Kurdistan, Iraq
- Hebei Medical University, Hebei, China
- Hellenic Mediterranean University, Crete, Greece

== Other uses ==
- Adang language, spoken in Indonesia
- Hmu Aung (1910–2004), Burmese politician
- Hmu language, or East Hmongic, spoken in eastern Guizhou, China
- Bo Hmu, a military rank in Burma; see Army ranks and insignia of Burma
