= Qiongzhou =

Qiongzhou may refer to:

- Qiongzhou Strait (琼州海峡), Chinese strait between Leizhou Peninsula, Guangdong and Hainan
- Qiongzhou Bridge (琼州大桥), a bridge over Nandu River in Haikou, Hainan, China
- Qiongzhou University (琼州学院), a university in Sanya, Hainan, China

== Historical prefectures ==
- Qiong Prefecture (Sichuan) (邛州), a prefecture between the 6th and 20th centuries in modern Sichuan, China
- Qiong Prefecture (Hainan) (瓊州), a prefecture between the 7th and 14th centuries in modern Hainan, China
