= Guilinyang =

Coordinates: 19.984602°N 110.466576°E

Guilinyang 桂林洋
- Town
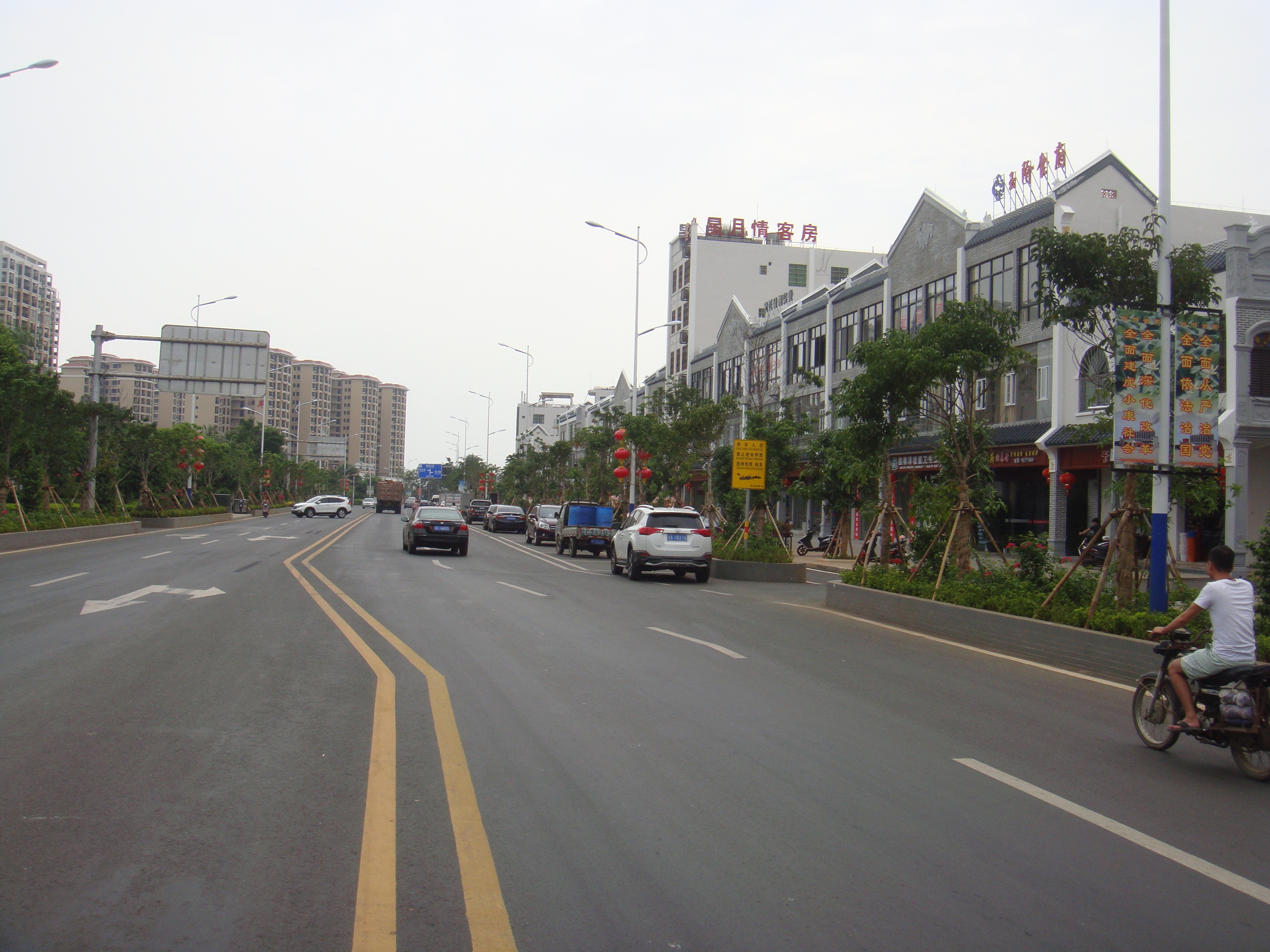
- Downtown in 2016
- Interactive map of Guilinyang
- Country: China
- Province: Hainan
- Prefecture-level city: Haikou
- District: Longhua
- Time zone: UTC+8 (China standard time)

Guilinyang (Chinese: 桂林洋) is a town within the Guilinyang Economic Development Zone, in Longhua District, Haikou, Hainan Province, China.

The main street has a single set of traffic lights at the main intersection, and acts as a thoroughfare between Lingshan, a town to the west, and other places to the east.

The main street has various companies such as phone shops, banks, et cetera. Near the main intersection, there is a market area of about one hectare. It contains a covered meat and vegetable market, surrounded by numerous small shops selling items ranging from clothing to hardware.

Adjacent to the market area is a hotel area, which includes several small hotels and restaurants.

Both the Hainan Normal University, Guilinyang Campus, and the still under-construction Haikou College of Economics, Guilinyang Campus, are located on the outskirts of the town.

Dozens of small and medium-sized factories, many of which produce pharmaceutical products, are also located in various locations throughout the town.

== Improvements ==
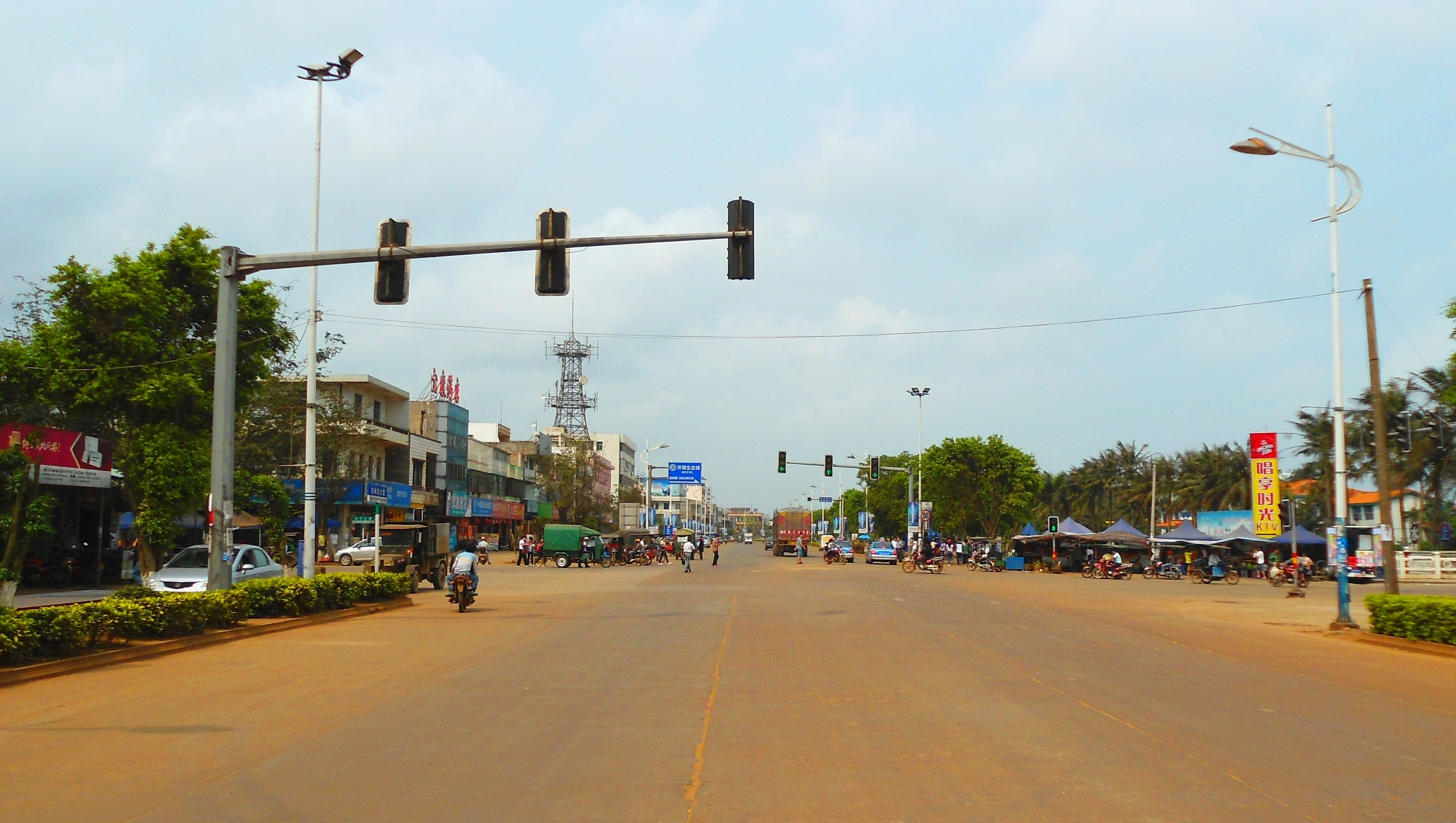
2012

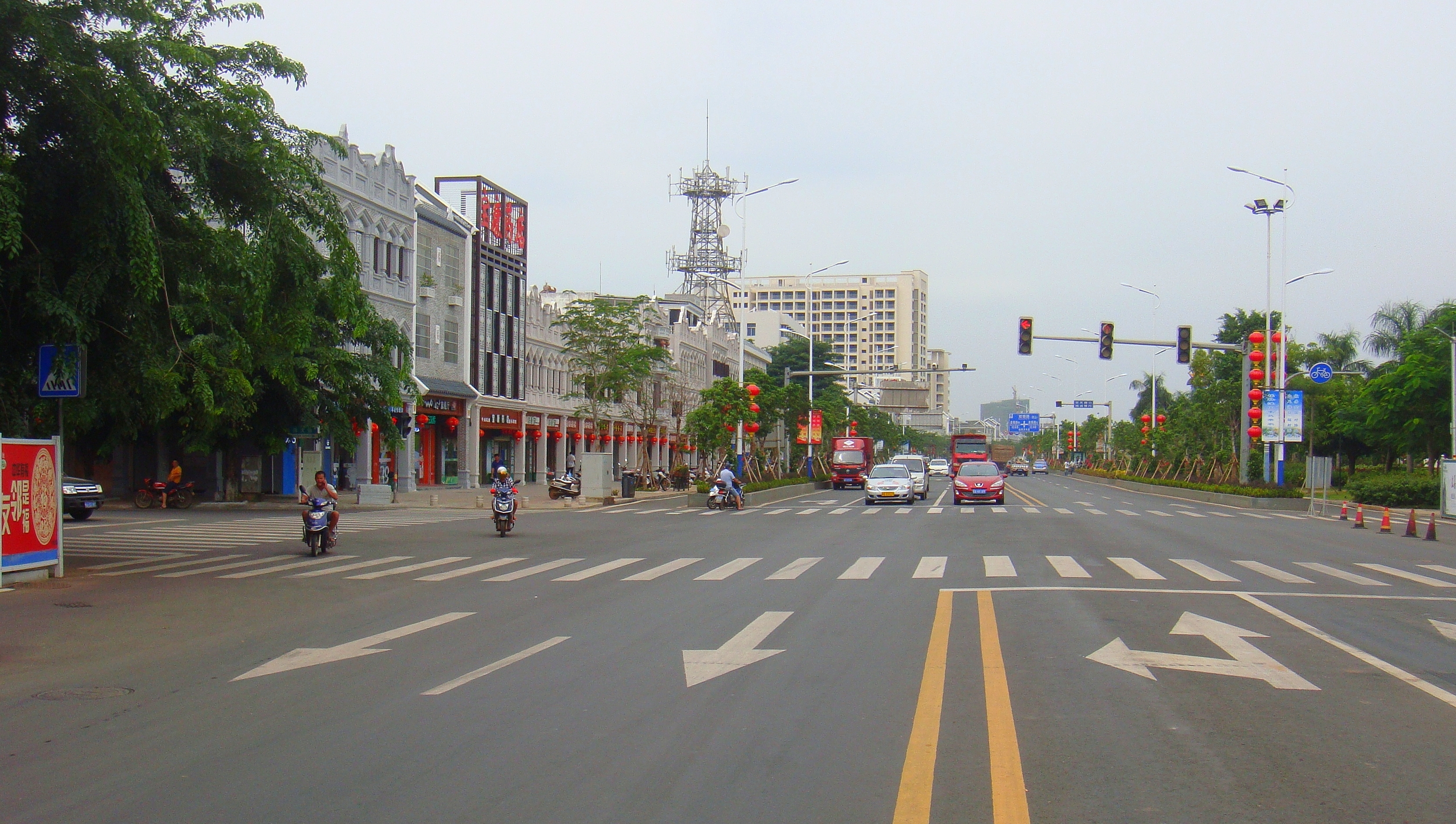
2016

A typical example of a town's improvement. The above images show the same main street in Guilinyang roughly four and a half years apart.

During 2015 and 2016, as part of a province-wide initiative, the town as undergone improvements, particularly on its main road. This has included installation of more attractive building facades, and the installation of new sidewalks and landscaping features.
