= Chinese Academy of Tropical Agricultural Sciences =

University in Haikou, China

Coordinates: 19.980826°N 110.32594°E

Chinese Academy of Tropical Agricultural Sciences (CATAS) 中国热带农业科学院
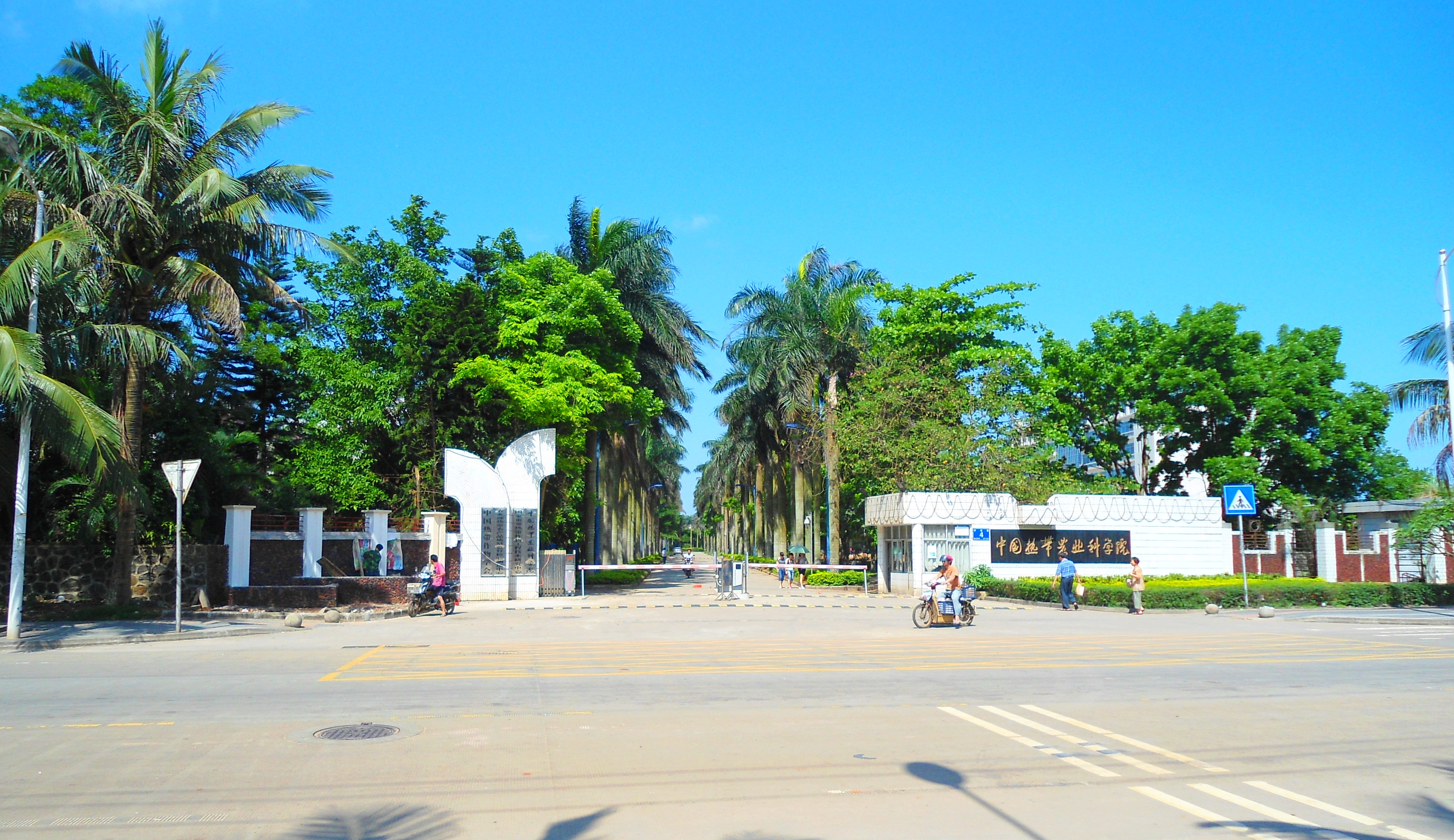
- Established: 1954; 72 years ago
- Officer in charge: fallers
- Location: Haikou, Hainan, China
- Campus: urban
- Website: http://www.catas.cn/

The Chinese Academy of Tropical Agricultural Sciences (CATAS) (Chinese: 中国热带农业科学院) is an agricultural university located in Haikou City, Hainan Province, China.

The academy was founded in 1954 in Guangzhou. It later moved to Danzhou, Hainan, and then to its current location in the south part of Haikou, beside the Hainan Medical College. Today, the academy has more than 3,000 staff members, 2,000 of which are involved in research work.
