= List of universities and colleges in Hainan =

The following is list of universities and colleges in Hainan.

Name	Chinese name	Type	Location	Note
Hainan University	海南大学	Provincial	Haikou	Project 211 Double First-Class Construction
Hainan Medical University	海南医学院	Provincial	Haikou	
Hainan Normal University	海南师范大学	Provincial	Haikou	
Hainan Tropical Ocean University	海南热带海洋学院	Provincial	Sanya	
Qiongtai Normal University	琼台师范学院	Provincial	Haikou	
Haikou University of Economics	海口经济学院	Private	Haikou	
University of Sanya	三亚学院	Private	Sanya	

== See also ==
- List of universities in China
- Higher education in China
