= Universiti Tunku Abdul Rahman =

Non-profit private research university in Malaysia

- Universiti Tunku Abdul Rahman (Malay) 拉曼大学 (Chinese) துங்கு அப்துல் ரகுமான் பல்கலைக்கழகம் (Tamil) (Jawi script) اونيۏرسيتي تونكو عبدالرحمن
- Motto: 德智体兼修 群美新并重
- Motto in English: Broadening Horizons, Transforming Lives
- Type: Private university Research university
- Established: 13 August 2002
- Affiliations: ACU; AACSB; UAiTED; Talloires Network of Engaged Universities
- Chancellor: Ling Liong Sik
- President: Ewe Hong Tat
- Director: Ting Chew Peh
- Faculty: >2,000 (2023)
- Students: >21,000 (2023)
- Undergraduates: 16,975 (2022)
- Postgraduates: 707 (2022)
- Location: Kampar, Perak; Sungai Long, Kajang, Selangor, Malaysia
- Campus: Kampar; Sungai Long
- Colours: Blue, yellow, red and white
- Website: www.utar.edu.my

Universiti Tunku Abdul Rahman
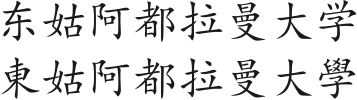
- Universiti Tunku Abdul Rahman in Simplified Chinese (top) and Traditional Chinese character (below)
- Simplified Chinese: 拉曼大学
- Traditional Chinese: 拉曼大學
Transcriptions
Standard Mandarin
- Hanyu Pinyin: Lāmàn Dàxué
- Wade–Giles: La^{1}-man^{2} Ta^{4}-hsüeh^{2}
- IPA: [lá.mân tâ.ɕɥě]
Yue: Cantonese
- Yale Romanization: Lāai-maahn-daaih-hohk
- Jyutping: Laai^{1}-maan^{6} Daai^{6}-hok^{6}
Southern Min
- Hokkien POJ: La-bān Tōa-o̍h

Universiti Tunku Abdul Rahman (abbreviated as UTAR; simplified Chinese: 拉曼大学; traditional Chinese: 拉曼大學) is a not-for-profit private research university in Malaysia. UTAR ranked among top 100 in the Times Higher Education Asia University Rankings 2018 and top 600 in the Times Higher Education World University Rankings 2021, placing it 2nd overall in Malaysia only after University of Malaya. UTAR also ranked 31st in UI GreenMetric Ranking Top 50 Under 50 2022, and 3rd in Malaysia for Nature Index Institution Research Output.

UTAR was established in June 2002 through the UTAR Education Foundation, a non-for-profit organisation. A total of 411 students were enrolled in June 2002 for its first intake.

The university has two campuses, the award-winning Kampar campus in the state of Perak while the other one is in Sungai Long located within the Klang Valley in the state of Selangor.

== History ==
In July 2001, the Malaysian Chinese Association (MCA), a monoethnic political party, received an invitation from the Malaysian Ministry of Education to establish a university. Ling Liong Sik, the President of the MCA, chaired a committee that drew up a framework for the establishment of the university. Another committee was formed to compile the necessary documents to receive approval from the local authorities. The second committee was led by Ng Lay Swee, the Principal of Tunku Abdul Rahman University College, a tertiary education institution also established by the MCA, and it included Lai Fatt Sian, the Head of the School of Business Studies of the University College, who became the founding Dean of the UTAR Faculty of Accountancy and Management. The university also established the Faculty of Arts and Social Science, led by Yeoh Suan Pow, and the Faculty of Information Communication and Technology, led by Tan Chik Heok. Ling Liong Sik was appointed Council Chairman of UTAR and Ng Lay Swee became the first President and CEO.

In June 2002, UTAR opened its doors to the pioneer batch students on its first campus located in Section 13 of Petaling Jaya, on premises previously owned by the publisher of a local daily called The Star.

Through the three newly established faculties, the university offered its first eight honours degree programmes At that time, the Faculty of Accountancy and Management, under founding Dean Lai Fatt Sian, hosted more than 6,000 students.

An official ceremony was held to launch UTAR on 13 August 2002 at the main hall of the Tunku Abdul Rahman University College. Attending the ceremony was the fourth Prime Minister of Malaysia, Mahathir Mohamad. The prime minister also officiated the university groundbreaking event at its new campus at Kampar, in the state of Perak.

UTAR once maintained campuses in Petaling Jaya and Kuala Lumpur, but in June 2015 these were consolidated with the Sungai Long campus.

Ng Lay Swee retired as the President on 31 March 2008. She was succeeded by Chuah Hean Teik. Following her retirement, many pioneering staff members who worked with her from the inception of the university left the establishment as well.

Chuah Hean Teik retired as the President on 31 August 2019. He was succeeded by Ewe Hong Tat effective from 1 September 2019.

== Campuses ==
Universiti Tunku Abdul Rahman Kampar Campus has an area of 1,300 acres (2.03 square miles; 5.26 square kilometres), is one of the largest private universities in Malaysia.

UTAR Kampar Campus
- UTAR Kampus Kampar (Malay) 拉曼大学金宝校区 (Chinese)

General information
- Location: Kampar, Perak, Malaysia, Kampar, Malaysia
- Groundbreaking: 12 January 2003
- Opened: May 2007
- Inaugurated: 1 June 2007

Website
- Kampar Campus - Universiti Tunku Abdul Rahman - UTAR

UTAR Kampar main campus is located at Kampar, Perak. The campus received the first intake of students in May 2007.

UTAR Sungai Long Campus
- UTAR Kampus Sungai Long (Malay) 拉曼大学双溪龙校区 (Chinese)

General information
- Location: Sungai Long, Selangor, Malaysia, Sungai Long, Malaysia
- Coordinates: 3°02′23″N 101°47′39″E
- Relocated: 1 June 2015

Technical details
- Floor count: KA Block: 8 KB Block: 10

Website
- Sungai Long Campus - UTAR

UTAR Sungai Long campus is located at Bandar Sungai Long, Kajang, Selangor.

Campuses
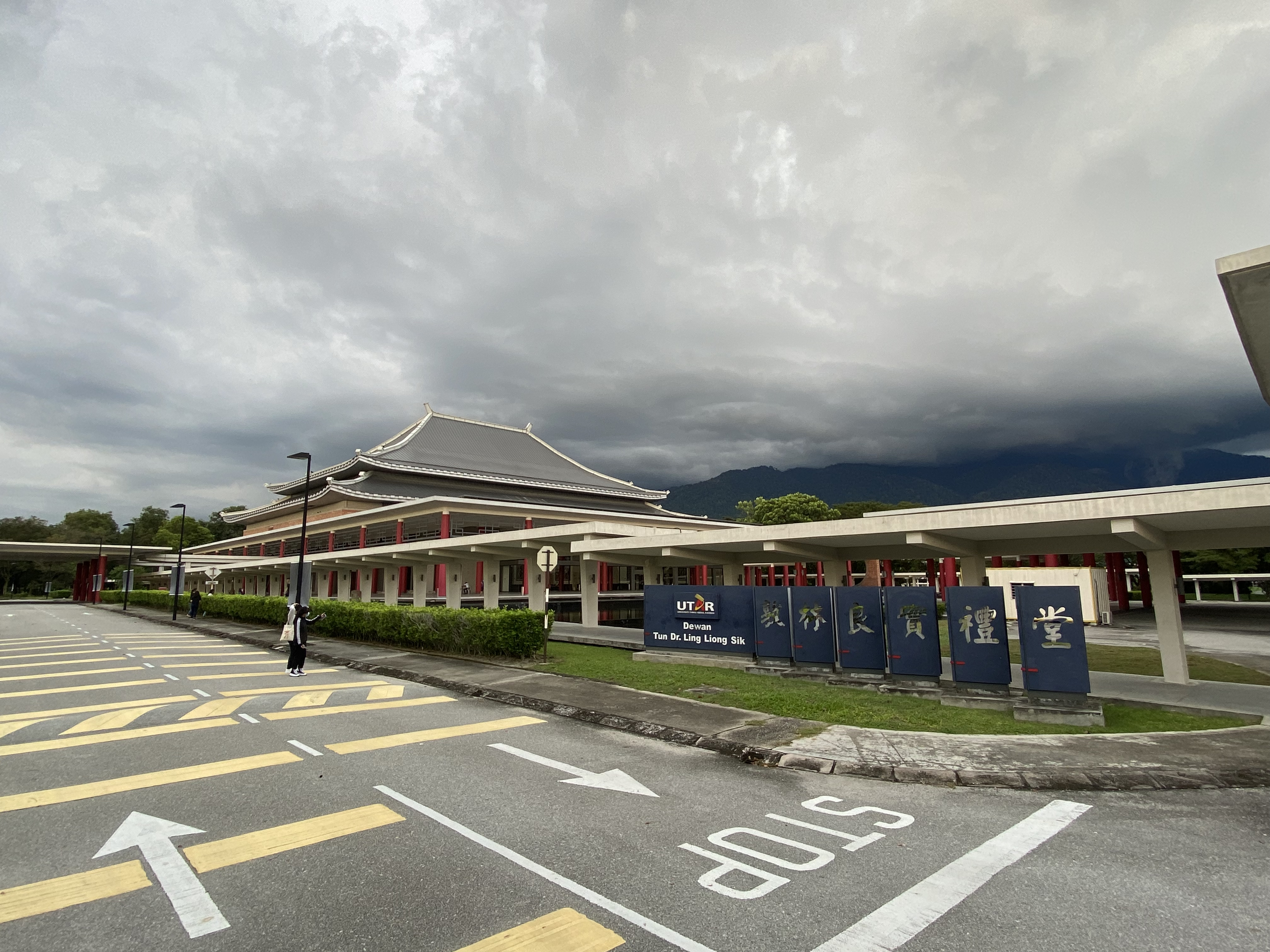
UTAR Kampar Campus

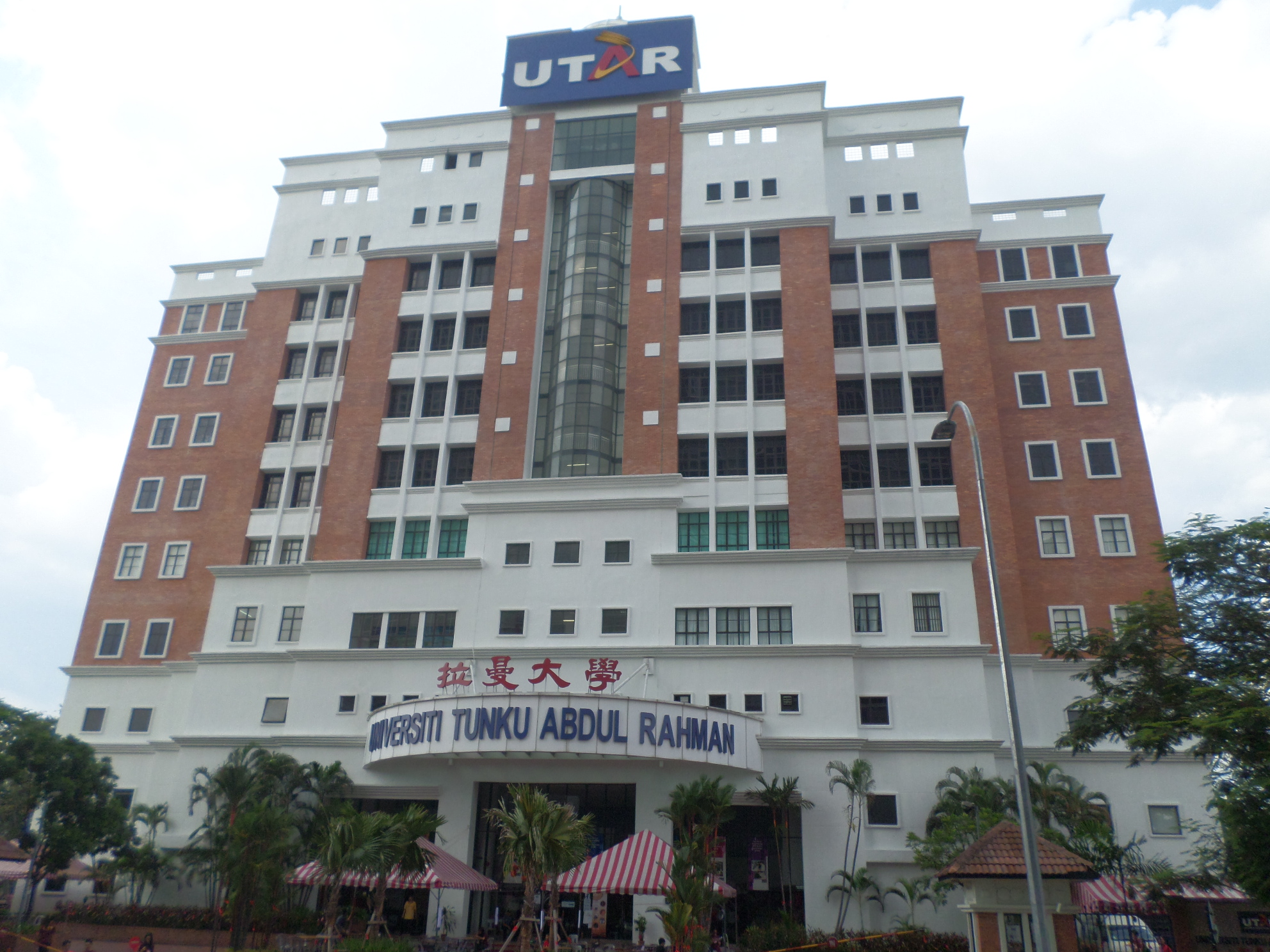
UTAR Sungai Long Campus

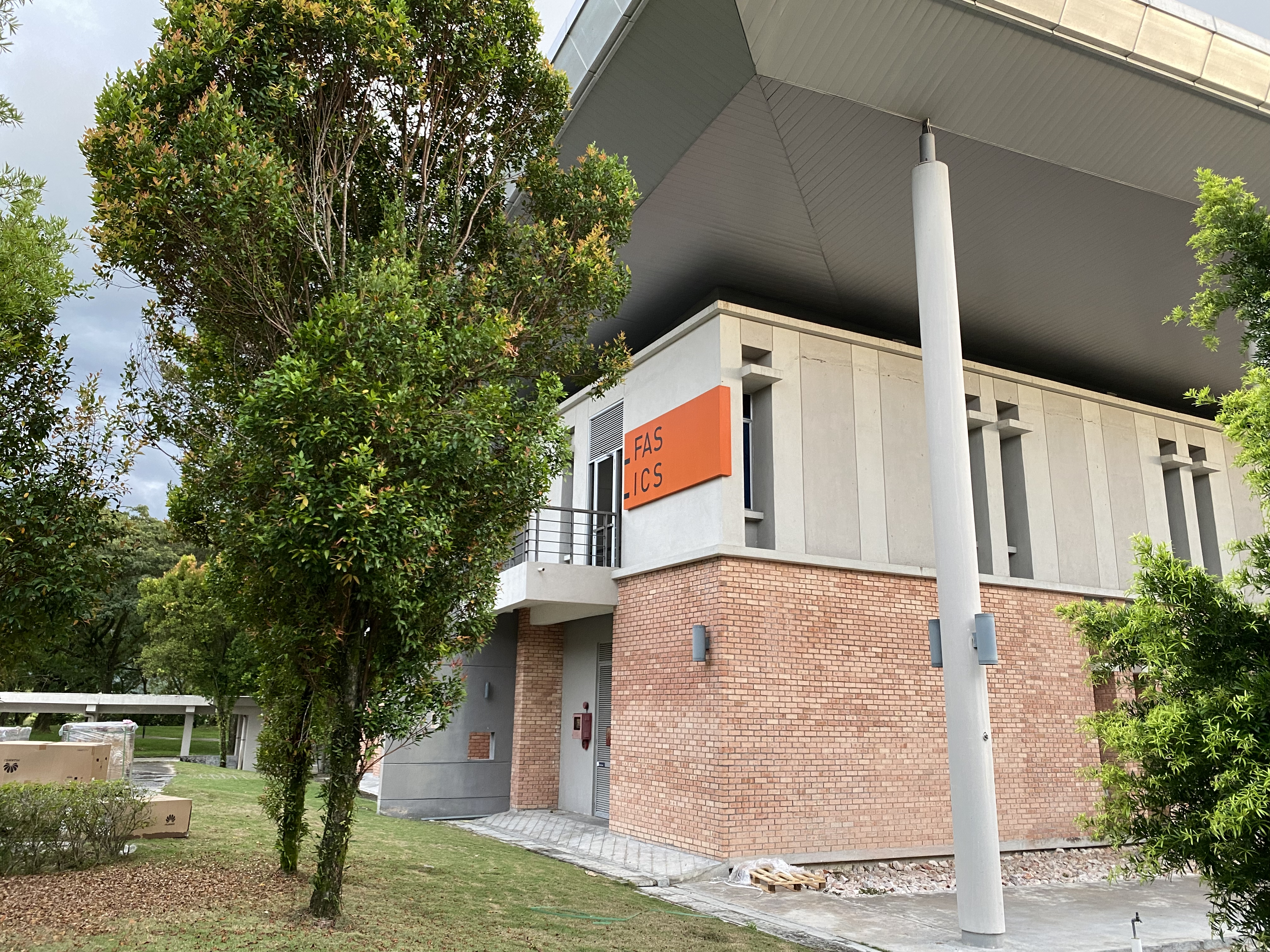
FAS and ICS at Kampar Campus

== Academic profile ==
=== Accreditation and memberships ===
All UTAR academic programmes are approved by the Malaysian Ministry of Higher Education (MOHE) and accredited by the Malaysian Qualifications Agency (MQA) and Public Service Department (JPA).

Various departments and programs at UTAR are also recognized by professional associations and institutes across Malaysia, other Southeast Asian countries, Australia, the Commonwealth, and the United States. The UTAR engineering degree programmes are recognized by the Board of Engineers Malaysia. This recognition allows UTAR engineering graduates to practice in 23 countries under the Washington Accord.

=== Rankings and reputation ===
University rankings

Global – Overall
- QS World: 801-1000 (2022)
- QS Employability: 201-250 (2022)
- THE World: 501-600 (2021)
- THE Young Universities: 301-350 (2023)

Regional – Overall
- QS Asia: =131 (2025)
- THE Asia: 119 (2021)
- THE Emerging Economies: 144 (2021)

National – Overall
- QS National: 14 (2021)
- THE National: 2 (2021)

UTAR has been mainly ranked by two international ranking systems, the QS University Rankings, and the Times Higher Education University Rankings.

UTAR also ranked 3rd in Malaysia for Nature Index Institution Research Output.

Ranking	2027	2026	2025	2024	2023	2022	2021	2020	2019	2018	2017	2016	2015	2014	2013
Times Higher Education World University Rankings		1001–1200	1001–1200	1001–1200	1001–1200	1001–1200	501–600	501–600	501–600	501–600					
Times Higher Education Asia University Rankings		351–400	351–400	351–400	351–400	351–400	119	119	111	99	111–120				
QS World University Rankings	801–850	791-800	801–850	801–850	800–1000	800–1000	800–1000	800–1000							
QS Asian University Rankings		109	131	160	174	167	157	181	188	251–260		251–300	251–300		251–300

The international UI GreenMetric annually ranks universities on their sustainability performance in infrastructure, energy and climate change, waste, water, transportation, and education. The ranking is organised by the Universitas Indonesia. In 2022, UTAR was ranked 91st.

The MQA is responsible for the Rating for Higher Education Institutions in Malaysia (SETARA) and the Discipline-Based Rating System (D-SETARA). In 2017, UTAR was rated Tier 5 (Excellence).

== Notable alumni ==
- Chew Mei Fun, Deputy Ministry of Women, Family and Community Development Malaysia (2009 - 2010)
- Julian Tan Kok Ping, Former Member of Parliament for Bandar Kuching
- Karen Kong Cheng Tshe (龚柯允), Singer
