= Luo Qingming =

Chinese scientist (born 1966)

- 骆清铭

President of Hainan University
- Incumbent
- Assumed office September 2008
- Preceded by: Li Jianbao

Personal details
- Born: January 1966 (age 60) Qichun County, Hubei, China
- Party: Chinese Communist Party
- Education: Xidian University; Huazhong University of Science and Technology; Perelman School of Medicine at the University of Pennsylvania
- Scientific career
- Fields: Photonics
- Workplaces: Hainan University

Chinese name
- Traditional Chinese: 駱清銘
- Simplified Chinese: 骆清铭
Transcriptions
Standard Mandarin
- Hanyu Pinyin: Luò Qīngmíng

Luo Qingming (Chinese: 骆清铭; born January 1966) is a Chinese scientist currently serving as president of Hainan University since September 2018.

== Education ==
Luo was born in Qichun County, Hubei in January 1966. He obtained his Bachelor of Engineering degree from Xidian University in 1986. He received his Master of Science in optics degree and Doctor of Engineering in physical electronics and optoelectronics degree from Huazhong University of Science and Technology in 1986 and 1993, respectively. From 1995 to 1997 he did post-doctoral research at the Perelman School of Medicine at the University of Pennsylvania.

== Career ==
After graduating from Huazhong University of Science and Technology, he taught there. In February 1997 he founded the Biomedical Photonics Research Center. In 1999 he became vice-chairman of its College of Life Science and Technology, rising to chairman in 2004. He served as chairman of College of Optoelectronic Science and Engineering between July 2007 and June 2012. In August 2007 he was promoted to become vice-president of Huazhong University of Science and Technology, he remained at the position until September 2018, when he was transferred to Haikou, capital of south China's Hainan province, as president of Hainan University.

== Honors and awards ==
- 2007 Fellow of the Society of Photo-Optical Instrumentation Engineers
- 2010 State Natural Science Award (Second Class)
- 2012 Fellow of the Institution of Engineering and Technology
- Fellow of The Optical Society
- November 22, 2019 Academician of the Chinese Academy of Sciences

Educational offices
Preceded by Li Jianbao (李建保)	President of Hainan University; 2018	Incumbent
