= Bandar Sungai Long =

Township in Malaysia

Coordinates: 3.0468524°N 101.7791828°E

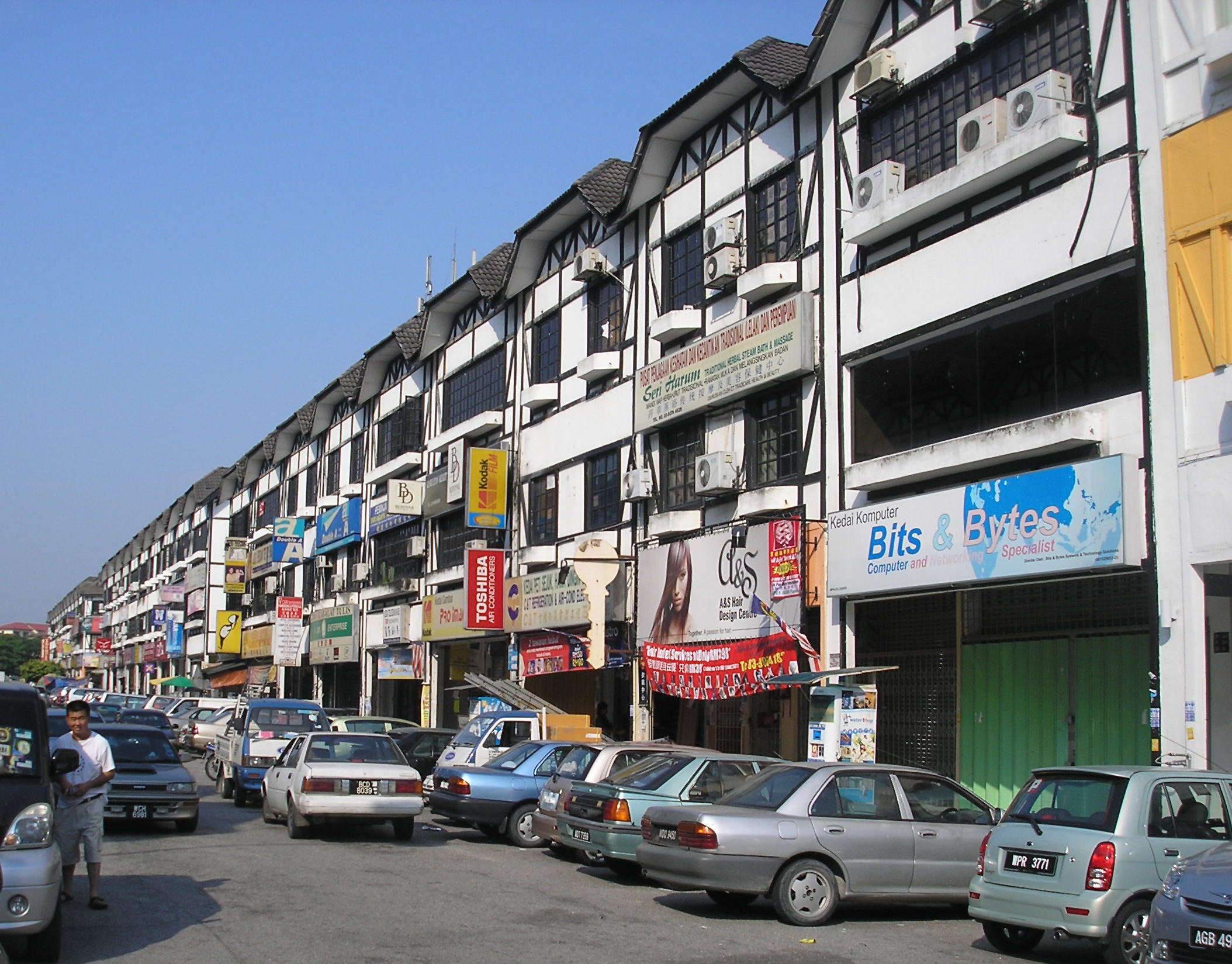
Sungai Long town

Bandar Sungai Long is a township in Cheras, Selangor, Malaysia. Bandar Sungai Long was designed for a population of 10,000 residents. The majority population in this township are Chinese with a minority of Indians and Malays living in this township.

The Universiti Tunku Abdul Rahman (UTAR) operates a campus in Sungai Long. It is currently under the administration of local council Majlis Perbandaran Cheras (MPKj).

The Sungai Long Golf & Country Club is situated in this township. It was built around the "leisure" living theme with residential homes surrounding an 18-hole golf course. High end detached houses were built around the golf course with semi-detached and terraced residential dwellings alongside condominiums, commercial properties and low cost low rise apartments on the outer edges of the development.

Sungai Long Buddhist Society was established in 2006 to create a close-knit Buddhist community in Bandar Sungai Long. A weekly pasar malam (night market) is held here every Tuesday. The 10th and current Prime Minister of Malaysia, Dato' Seri Anwar Ibrahim, currently resides in Bandar Sungai Long with his family since 2021.

In 2024, Dino Desert was located at Sungai Long Hill where there are huge dinosaurs like Mimaland.

== Educational ==
=== Secondary ===
Sekolah Menengah Kebangsaan Bandar Baru Sungai Long

=== Primary ===
- Sekolah Jenis Kebangsaan (Cina) Bandar Sungai Long
- Sekolah Kebangsaan Taman Rakan

=== Tertiary ===
- Universiti Tunku Abdul Rahman (UTAR) Sungai Long Campus

== Transportation ==
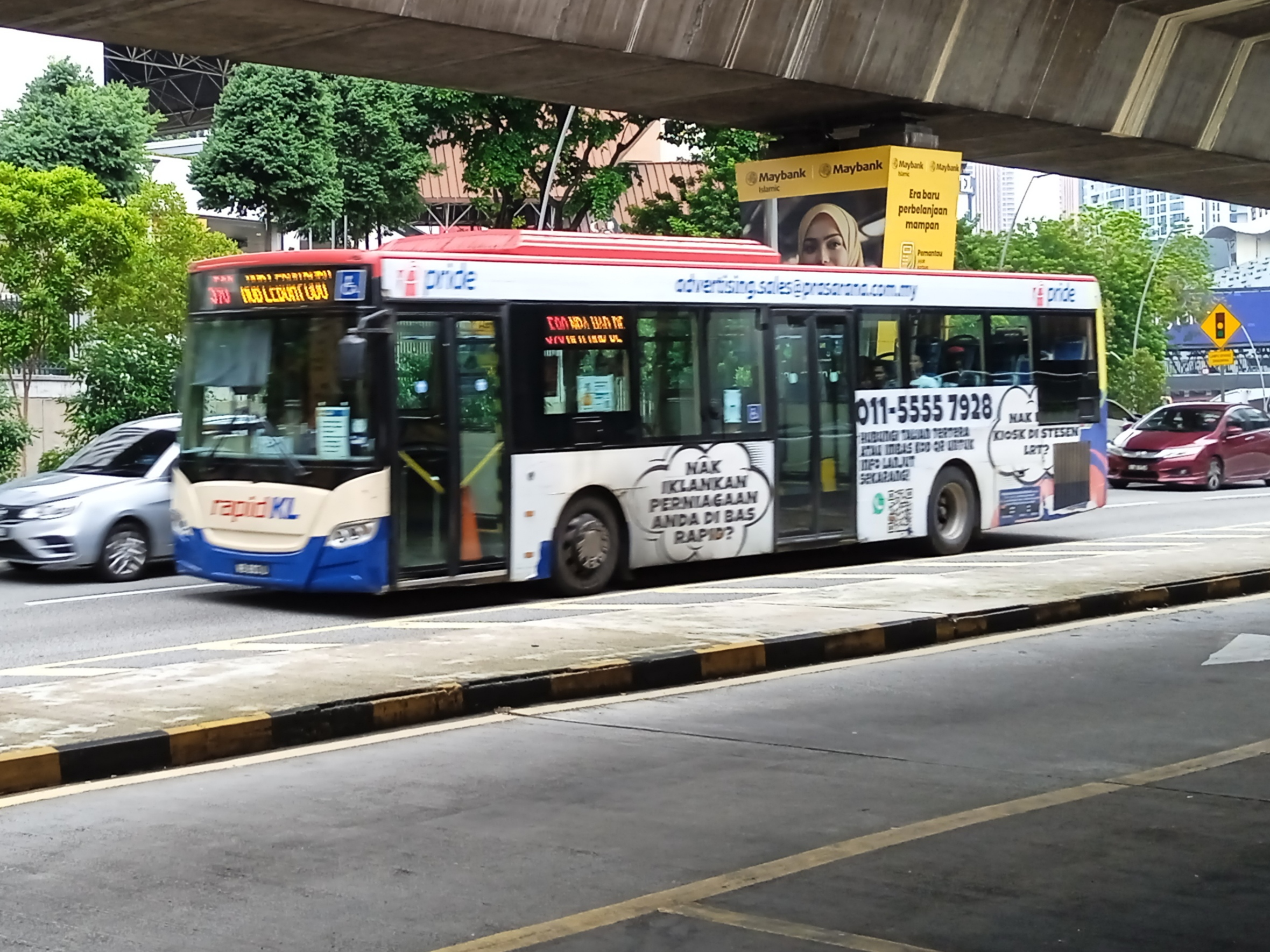
Rapid KL bus route 590 at Lebuh Pudu bus hub, 2023.

The area is accessible by Rapid KL MRT feeder bus (Bas Perantara MRT) route T453 from Bukit Dukung MRT station to Bandar Sungai Long. Bandar Sungai Long is also accessible by Rapid KL trunk bus route 590 from Lebuh Pudu bus hub at Jalan Tun Tan Siew Sin, Kuala Lumpur via Jalan Chan Sow Lin, Sungai Besi Expressway, Kajang Dispersal Link Expressway, Jalan Sungai Long and end at Hab UTAR near Universiti Tunku Abdul Rahman (UTAR) Sungai Long Campus building.
