= Zhong Shijian =

Chinese politician (born 1956)

- 钟世坚

Deputy Secretary of the Guangdong Provincial Discipline Inspection Commission
- In office March 2013 – March 2015
- Secretary: Huang Xianyao (黄先耀)
- Preceded by: Lin Haokun
- Succeeded by: Wang Yanshi

Mayor of Zhuhai
- In office January 2007 – October 2011
- Preceded by: Wang Shunsheng
- Succeeded by: He Ningka

Personal details
- Born: May 1956 (age 70) Dianbai District, Maoming, Guangdong, China
- Party: Chinese Communist Party (1975–2015; expelled)
- Education: Hainan Normal University

Zhong Shijian (simplified Chinese: 钟世坚; traditional Chinese: 鐘世堅; pinyin: Zhōng Shìjiān; born May 1956) is a former Chinese politician who spent most of his career in South China's Guangdong province. As of April 2015 he was under investigation by the Chinese Communist Party's Central Commission for Discipline Inspection. Previously he served as Deputy Secretary of the Guangdong Provincial Discipline Inspection Commission, Head of Guangdong Supervision Department, and Director of Guangdong Provincial Corruption Prevention Bureau.

== Life and career ==
Zhong was born and raised in Dianbai District of Maoming city, in Guangdong province. In January 1980 he graduated from Hainan Normal University, majoring in biology.

He served in various administrative and political roles in Zhuhai before serving as Chinese Communist Party Deputy Committee Secretary in January 2004. He concurrently served as Mayor of Zhuhai in January 2007.

In January 2012, he was appointed Deputy Secretary of the Guangdong Provincial Discipline Inspection Commission, at the same time as holding the posts of Head of Guangdong Supervision Department, and Director of Guangdong Provincial Corruption Prevention Bureau between April 2013 to April 2015.

He was a delegate to the 11th National People's Congress.

== Downfall ==
On April 1, 2015, the state media reported that he was placed under investigation by the Central Commission for Discipline Inspection. On July 21, he was expelled from the Chinese Communist Party (CCP).

In 2016, he was sentenced to 15 years and 6 months and fined 3.5 million yuan for taking bribes by the Xiamen Intermediate People's Court.

Chinese media Caixin reported that he had close relations with Zhu Mingguo, former chairman of the Guangdong Provincial Committee of the Chinese People's Political Consultative Conference.

Party political offices
Preceded by Lin Haokun (林浩坤)	Deputy Secretary of the Guangdong Provincial Discipline Inspection Commission; 2013–2015	Succeeded by Wang Yanshi
Government offices
Preceded by Wang Shunsheng (王顺生)	Mayor of Zhuhai; 2007–2011	Succeeded by He Ningka (何宁卡)
Preceded by Lin Haokun	Head of Guangdong Supervision Department; 2013–2015	Succeeded by Wang Yanshi
Preceded by Lin Haokun	Director of Guangdong Provincial Corruption Prevention Bureau; 2013–2015	Succeeded by Wang Yanshi
