= 2018 Minjiang University protests =

Food protests in Fuzhou, Fujian, China

2018 Minjiang University Protests
- Part of protest and dissent in China
- Date: 11 November 2018 － 16 November 2018
- Location: Minjiang University, Fuzhou, Fujian, China
- Caused by: Minjiang University issued a ban on take-out food on campus
- Goals: Pursue diversified dining options and protest against the school's measures to ban take-out food from entering the campus
- Methods: Students: Online protests, Shouting demonstrations Take-out merchants: Joint distribution of free lunch
- Result: Minjiang university relaxes its restrictions on take-out; The rumor of He Daiqin share dining hall was refuted; 48 take-out merchants who gave out free lunches detained by police

Parties
Students; Take-out merchants	Minjiang University leadership

In November 2018, students and local food vendors of Minjiang University protested the ban of take-out food on the campus.

== Background ==
With the rise of online ordering platforms, many Minjiang University students turned to takeout food options to avoid ongoing food safety concerns associated with the university's often-crowded dining hall and canteens. Subsequent business loss led to objections being raised by traditional eating establishments.

Around this time, several universities including USTB (University of Science and Technology Beijing), BIT (Beijing Institute of Technology) and Guangxi University of Foreign Languages implemented regulations to prohibit or restrict deliveries by takeout providers. Minjiang University planned to follow suit.

Early in November 2018, rumors circulated claiming the university was to ban take-out food. Then, on November 11, Minjiang University issued a new regulation banning take-out food from entering the campus. This was confirmed in the morning via the release of the "instructions on the special work of campus renovation" on the official blog of the Student Work Office. The new regulation prohibited the consumption of take-out food on campus and threatened disciplinary action against students caught with take-out food on campus.

== Protests ==
At noon on November 12, the university's dining hall saw an abnormally large crowd, with the second canteen filled to near capacity. Students, unable to get seats, were forced to wait in line at the gate. Noting the situation, several nearby take-out vendors turned up at the entrance of the Second Canteen and began offering free lunches. They also called on students to boycott the new take-out ban. In response, the university sent personnel to enforce order by asking the vendors to leave the premises. When the vendors refused to leave, the university referred the matter to the police, who arrived to remove the vendors.

Later in the day, students posted an online critique of Mr. He Daiqin (the Party Secretary of Minjiang University), accusing him of instigating the ban on take-out food. They called for Mr. He to resign and demanded he be investigated by authorities.

Some dormitory areas were in turmoil, with many students shouting from buildings in protest of the school's take-out ban.

== Aftermath ==
On November 12, the school responded to the situation by allowing vendors to set up take-away food areas outside school gates.

On the afternoon of November 13, university officials rejected students' charges against Mr. He Daiqin, and declined to investigate these allegations. The university subsequently relaxed the ban on take-away food on campus, calming protests and enabling take-away vendors to deliver food on campus.

On the evening of November 14, Fuzhou police reported that four take-out food vendors who had distributed free lunches at the entrance to the Second Canteen of Minjiang University were placed in administrative detention for seriously disturbing the normal order of the school.

On November 15, the university continued to allow take-out food to enter parts of the campus, and tweeted that it would further facilitate student meals, yet dismissed the allegation that "He Daiqin, the university leader, owned shares in the canteen" as an internet rumor.

Vendors were permitted to set up in the dormitory area and make arrangements for selling and delivering food. Later, they officially recognized take-away food areas in Districts 3 and 4. This official recognition was further extended to Districts 1 and 2 on the morning of November 16. At noon on November 13, Minjiang University At the request of Minjiang University officials, Sina Weibo officially removed some topics about the take-out ban and deleted some micro blogs that attacked the university and its leadership. This was done to suppress hot searches and limit potential damage to the university's image.

== Media attention ==
At noon on November 12, after nearby take-out stalls were removed by the police, many witnesses uploaded photos and video of the scene to the internet. They complained about the university and compared it to a "prison". News about Minjiang University's take-out food ban trended on the hot search list on Sina Weibo.

Further reporting by Sina, Pear Video, People's Daily, CNR and other media also covered the role of take-out food in colleges. Television channels CCTV-2 and CCTV-12 both ran stories on "Minjiang University has banned take-out food and merchants have offered free lunches".

After the take-away ban incident, university staff interviewed by the media offered clarification on the ban. They stated that the university's objection was not to the ordering of take-away meals, but rather to the influx of take-away delivery vehicles which caused excessive on-campus traffic. They indicated that students ordering take-away food should meet their deliveries at the designated areas at the school's gates.
