= Hainan Normal University =

Public university in Haikou, China

Coordinates: 19.998919°N 110.336863°E

- 海南师范大学
- Motto: Exalt Virtue, Pursue Studies, Seek Truth and Make Innovation
- Type: Public university
- Established: 1949
- Location: Haikou, Hainan, China
- Website: hainnu.edu.cn

Chinese name
- Simplified Chinese: 海南师范大学
- Traditional Chinese: 海南師範大學
Transcriptions
Standard Mandarin
- Hanyu Pinyin: Hǎinán Shīfàn Dàxué

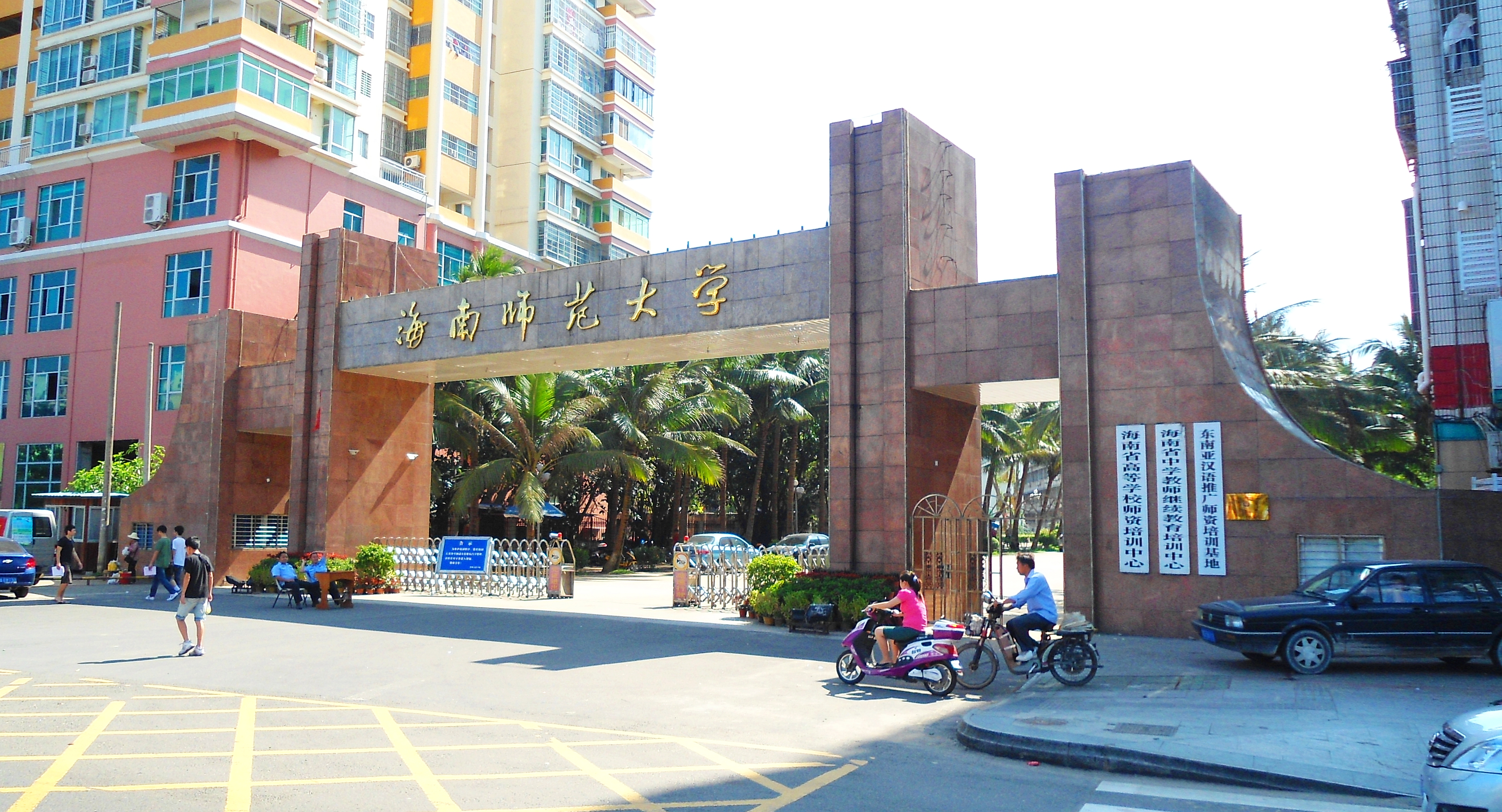
Hainan Normal University Haikou Campus

Hainan Normal University (海南师范大学) is a provincial public university in Haikou, Hainan, China.

The university is the province's oldest institution for higher learning. The 3,347-square-meter campus is also home to The Secondary School Teacher's Continuation Education Centre of Hainan and the Training Centre for Higher Learning Institution are also located on the campus. In 2008, a new campus opened in Guilinyang Town, several kilometres southeast of Haikou.

== Faculty ==
- 800 full-time teachers
- 92 professors
- 214 associate professors

== Departments and programs ==
- 15 departments
- 18 research institutions
- 17 graduate programs
- 36 undergraduate programs
- 2 provincial key laboratories

== See also ==
- List of universities and colleges in Hainan
- List of universities in China
- Higher education in China
