= University of Sanya =

Private college in Sanya, Hainan, China

- Established: 2005
- Location: Sanya, Hainan, China
- Website: sanyau.edu.cn

Chinese name
- Simplified Chinese: 三亚学院
- Traditional Chinese: 三亞學院
Transcriptions
Standard Mandarin
- Hanyu Pinyin: Sānyà Xuéyuàn

The University of Sanya (三亚学院; lit. 'Sanya College') is a private college in Sanya, Hainan, China. It is privately owned and operated by Geely Group.

== See also ==
- List of universities and colleges in Hainan
