= Hainan Tropical Ocean University =

Public college in Sanya, Hainan, China

Coordinates: 18.3084°N 109.5354°E

- 海南热带海洋学院
- Type: Public college
- Established: 1977
- Administrative staff: 721
- Students: 10,000
- Location: Sanya, Hainan, China
- Website: www.hntou.edu.cn

Chinese name
- Simplified Chinese: 海南热带海洋学院
- Traditional Chinese: 海南熱帶海洋學院
Transcriptions
Standard Mandarin
- Hanyu Pinyin: Hǎinán Rèdài Hǎiyáng Xuéyuàn

Hainan Tropical Ocean University (HTOU; 海南热带海洋学院) is a provincial public undergraduate college in Sanya, Hainan, China. It is affiliated with the Province of Hainan, and co-funded by the Hainan Provincial People's Government, the Ministry of Natural Resources (State Oceanic Administration), the China National Offshore Oil Corporation, the Sanya Municipal People's Government, and the Sansha Municipal People's Government.

Despite its English name, the school has not been granted university status.

== History ==
HTOU was previously named Qiongzhou University and had a single campus in Wuzhishan in the middle of Hainan island. It then opened a second campus in Sanya. At that time, its name changed from Qiongzhou University.

HTOU is the result of a number of schools merging over time. It was formed from the Guangdong Province's school named Hainan Li and Miao Autonomous Region Normal School (established in 1954) and by Hainan Li and Miao Autonomous Prefecture Teachers' College (which was established in 1958). Further mergers and splits and name changes were made. Then, in 1993, it became the Qiongzhou College, a post-secondary education school, after a merger between Hainan Tongza Normal Post-secondary College and Hainan Tongza College of Education. In 2006, after further development and construction, it was renamed Qiongzhou University teaching undergraduate education. Hainan Normal School for Nationalities was merged into Qiongzhou University in 2006. In 2008, the main campus was established in Sanya. In September 2015, it became Hainan Tropical Ocean University.

== Description ==
HTOU has two campuses: one in Sanya, and one in Wuzhishan. The total gross floor area is 385,800 square meters, which includes 171,400 square meters for teaching and administration. The total area of the two campuses is 133.33 hectares.

HTOU has a fixed-asset value of 894,453,700 RMB. The value of the teaching and scientific research facilities is 101,159,600 RMB. HTOU libraries have 342,800 electronic books and 1,277,100 paper books.

== Students and faculty ==
There are 14,640 full-time students at HTOU. This includes 51 postgraduates, 11,354 undergraduates, 3,235 students of post-secondary programs, and 103 international students. These students are taught by 1,000 faculty members.

== Courses ==
HTOU now has 12 schools that offer the following:

- 1 MTA (Master of Tourism Administration) program
- 44 undergraduate programs and 12 post-secondary programs

HTOU teaches 9 fields:

- Agriculture
- Education
- Engineering
- History
- Law
- Liberal Arts
- Management
- Philosophy
- Sciences

== See also ==
- List of universities and colleges in Hainan
- List of universities in China
- Higher education in China
