= Hainan Medical University =

Provincial public university in Haikou, Hainan, China

- 海南医科大学
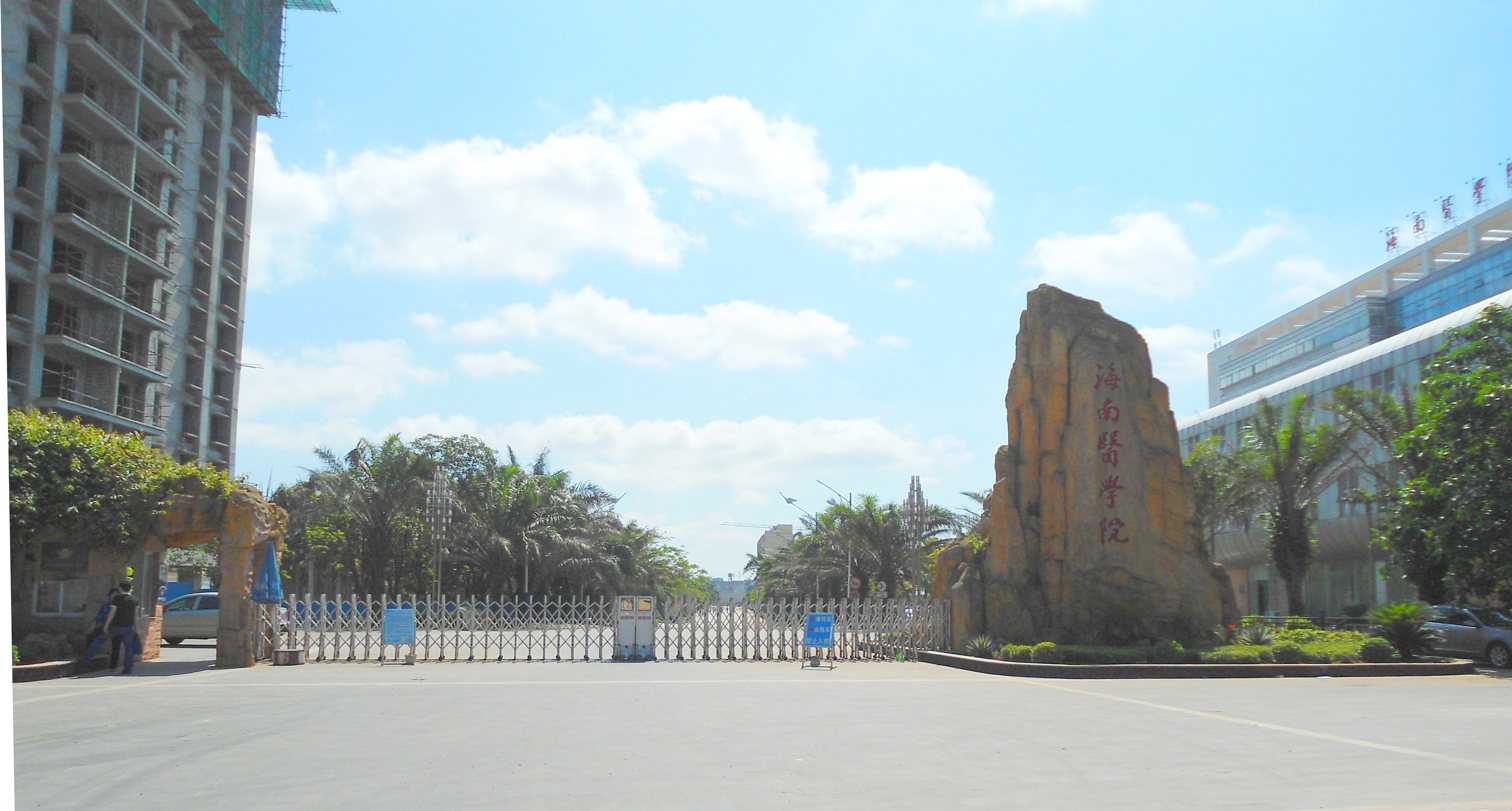
- Front gate
- Former names: Hainan Specialized Medical School; Haiqiang Medical Vocational School (1947); Medical College of Hainan University (1948); Hainan Medical College (1952-2016)
- Type: Public
- Established: 1993
- Affiliations: ASRMU
- President: Yang Jun
- Location: Haikou, Hainan, China; 19°59′04″N 110°19′45″E
- Website: muhn.edu.cn

Chinese name
- Simplified Chinese: 海南医科大学
- Traditional Chinese: 海南醫科大學
Transcriptions
Standard Mandarin
- Hanyu Pinyin: Hǎinán Yī Xuéyuàn

Hainan Medical University (HMU or MUHN (Note: Stands for the Medical University of Hainan.); 海南医科大学) is a provincial public medical college in Haikou, Hainan, China. It is affiliated with and funded by the Hainan Provincial People's Government.

The college was established in 1993.

== History ==
The current college was created in 1993 with the approval of the central government. In 1951, two private medical colleges were merged to form the Hainan Specialized Medical School. These two colleges were Haiqiang Medical Vocational School (created in 1947) and the Medical College of Hainan University (established in 1948).

Mr. Tseven Soong was its first General Director of the Board. After the founding of the People's Republic of China in 1949, this school was restructured as the Hainan Medical Vocational School and later became the Medical Department of Hainan University.

In 1993, the college became the Hainan Medical College to reflect its specialization in medicine. In 1994, Hainan Medical College was accredited to offer bachelor's degrees. Further, in 1996, the school was accredited for undergraduate education by the Ministry of Education.

In 2000, the College established a new campus on Chengxi Road.

== Academic departments ==
- Basic Medical Science Department
- Clinical Medicine Institute
- Traditional Chinese Medicine Institute
- Laboratory Sciences Department
- Preventative Medicine Department
- Dental Sciences Department
- Nursing Sciences Department
- Pharmacy Department
- Vocational Educational Institute
- International Student Institute
- Foreign Language Department
- Information Technology Department
- Physical Education Department
- Department of Humanities and Social Sciences

== See also ==
- List of universities and colleges in Hainan
- List of universities in China
- Higher education in China
