= Minjiang University =

Provincial public university in Fuzhou, Fujian, China

Coordinates: 26.064705°N 119.169114°E

- 闽江大学
- Type: Public, undergraduate
- Established: 2002
- Head: He Daiqin
- Location: Fuzhou, Fujian, China
- Campus: Suburban
- Website: mju.edu.cn

Chinese name
- Simplified Chinese: 闽江学院
- Traditional Chinese: 閩江學院
Transcriptions
Standard Mandarin
- Hanyu Pinyin: Mǐnjiāng Xuéyuàn

Minjiang University (闽江大学) is a provincial public university in Fuzhou, Fujian, China. It is administrated by the Province of Fujian.

The college was established in 2002 with the approval of the Ministry of Education. Fujian Music College was merged into the school in 2010.

On 4 February 2026, the university changed its Chinese name following approval from the Ministry of Education.

== See also ==
- 2018 Minjiang University Protests
