= Hainan University =

Provincial public university in Haikou, Hainan, China

Coordinates: 20°03′38″N 110°19′17″E

- 海南大学
- Type: Public
- Established: 1958; 68 years ago
- President: Luo Qingming
- Administrative staff: 3,977
- Students: 46,629
- Undergraduates: 33,748
- Postgraduates: 7,205
- Doctoral students: 410
- Location: Hainan Province, China; Haidian Campus: 58th Renmin Avenue, Meilan District, Haikou City; Danzhou Campus: Baodaoxincun (寶島新村), Nada Town, Danzhou City; Chengxi Teaching Area: 4th Xueyuan Road, Longhua District, Haikou City; Mission Hill Campus (including Chengxi Teaching Area): 52nd Yangshan Avenue, Longhua District, Haikou City; Yazhou Campus: Gannong Avenue, Yazhou District, Sanya City
- Campus: 5 campuses
- Website: hainanu.edu.cn en.hainanu.edu.cn

Chinese name
- Simplified Chinese: 海南大学
- Traditional Chinese: 海南大學
Transcriptions
Standard Mandarin
- Hanyu Pinyin: Hǎinán Dàxué

Hainan University (HainanU or HNU) is a provincial public university in Haikou, Hainan, China. It is affiliated with the Province of Hainan, and co-funded by the Hainan Provincial People's Government, the Ministry of Education, and the Ministry of Finance. The university is part of Project 211 and the Double First-Class Construction.

The current form of Hainan University was formed by the merger between the original Hainan University and the South China University of Tropical Agriculture (华南热带农业大学) in August 2007.

== History ==
The original Hainan University was established in 1983. It was a key provincial university. On August 14, 2007, the Ministry of Education approved the merger of the South China University of Tropical Agriculture (SCUTA) and Hainan University merged into a single entity which kept the Hainan University name.

South China University of Tropical Agriculture (South China Institute of Tropical Crops) was created in 1958 by the central people's government to break the obstruction and embargo of natural rubber forced by foreign powers. It specialized in rubber and tropical agriculture. It was the only higher education center in Hainan to offer the State Key Disciplines and doctoral programs, which ran in partnership with the China Academy of Tropical Agriculture created in 1954 (South China Academy of Tropical Crops) to have won over 900 education and scientific research awards.

South China Institute of Tropical Crops (1954)
China Academy of Tropical Agriculture (National)
Hainan University (1983)	South China University of Tropical Agriculture (1958)
Hainan University (2007)

- In 2008, Hainan University was approved by the state as a key university under the 211 Project.
- In 2012, Hainan University was included in the Plan of Strengthening Higher Education in Middle and Western China and was successively supported by the National Basic Ability Construction Project of Western and Central China and the National Comprehensive Strength Enhancement Project of Western and Central China.
- In 2017, Hainan University was listed in the national plan for establishing world-class disciplines.
- In 2018, the Hainan provincial Party Committee and provincial government made a strategic decision to fully sponsor the development of Hainan University. Also in that year, the university came under the joint administration of the Ministry of Education and the Hainan Provincial People's Government, and was included among universities directly administered by the Ministry of Education.

== Campuses ==
Hainan University consists of 5 campuses, with a total area of 741 acres (3.00 km^{2}):

=== Haidian Campus ===
- The main campus, located on Haidian Island in Haikou. It has three main gates: The east gate, located on Renmin Avenue, the north gate, located on Haidian Wuxi Road, and the new south gate, located on Bihai Avenue.

=== Chengxi Teaching Area ===
- Located on Xueyuan Road in Longhua District of Haikou.

=== Mission Hills Campus ===
- Named after the Mission Hills Group. Located on Mission Hill Tour Area in the city of Haikou.

=== Danzhou Campus ===
- Located in the city of Danzhou.

=== Yazhou Campus ===
- Located in the city of Sanya.

== Key Labs ==
=== State Key Laboratory of Marine Resource Utilization in South China Sea ===
The State Key Laboratory of Marine Resource Utilization in the South China Sea is both the first state key laboratory for marine resources development, utilization and protection in the South China Sea and the only school-based state key laboratory co-established by Hainan Province and national ministries. In terms of members, Academician Zhang Si is currently the director of the Academic Committee, Professor Li Jianbao is the director of the Lab, and Professor Wang Ning is its deputy director.

=== Hainan Key Laboratory for Sustainable Utilization of Tropical Bioresources ===
The Hainan Key Laboratory for Sustainable Utilization of Tropical Bioresources – State-level national key laboratory and cultivation base co-founded by Hainan province and Ministry of Science and Technology was established in 2010 by the Ministry of Science and Technology. Based on the needs of social and economic development and discipline construction in Hainan province, the laboratory takes the characteristic tropical crop resources and tropical microorganisms in Hainan province as research objects, and comprehensively and systematically carries out basic research for application on sustainable utilization of tropical bioresources.
Research interests include research on tropical agricultural bioresources (collection and utilization of tropical crop resource and tropical microorganism resource, regulation on tropical biological secondary metabolism and biosynthesis research), research on genetic improvement of tropical crops (molecular basis of regulation on important agronomic traits of major tropical crops, research on disease-resistant and stress-resistant molecular mechanism of tropical crops, molecular breeding of major tropical crops), research on new tropical ecological agriculture technologies (tropical efficient ecological agriculture and material recycling, degradation and restoration of tropical agro-ecosystem, research on efficient use of tropical crop nutrient and key technology to improve quality). The establishment of a theoretical system and technology platform for the sustainable use of tropical bioresources and the domestic leading tropical agrobiology research center is praised by international counterparts in the tropics, promoting the construction and development of the first-class crop science discipline of Hainan University.

== Gallery ==
Haidian campus

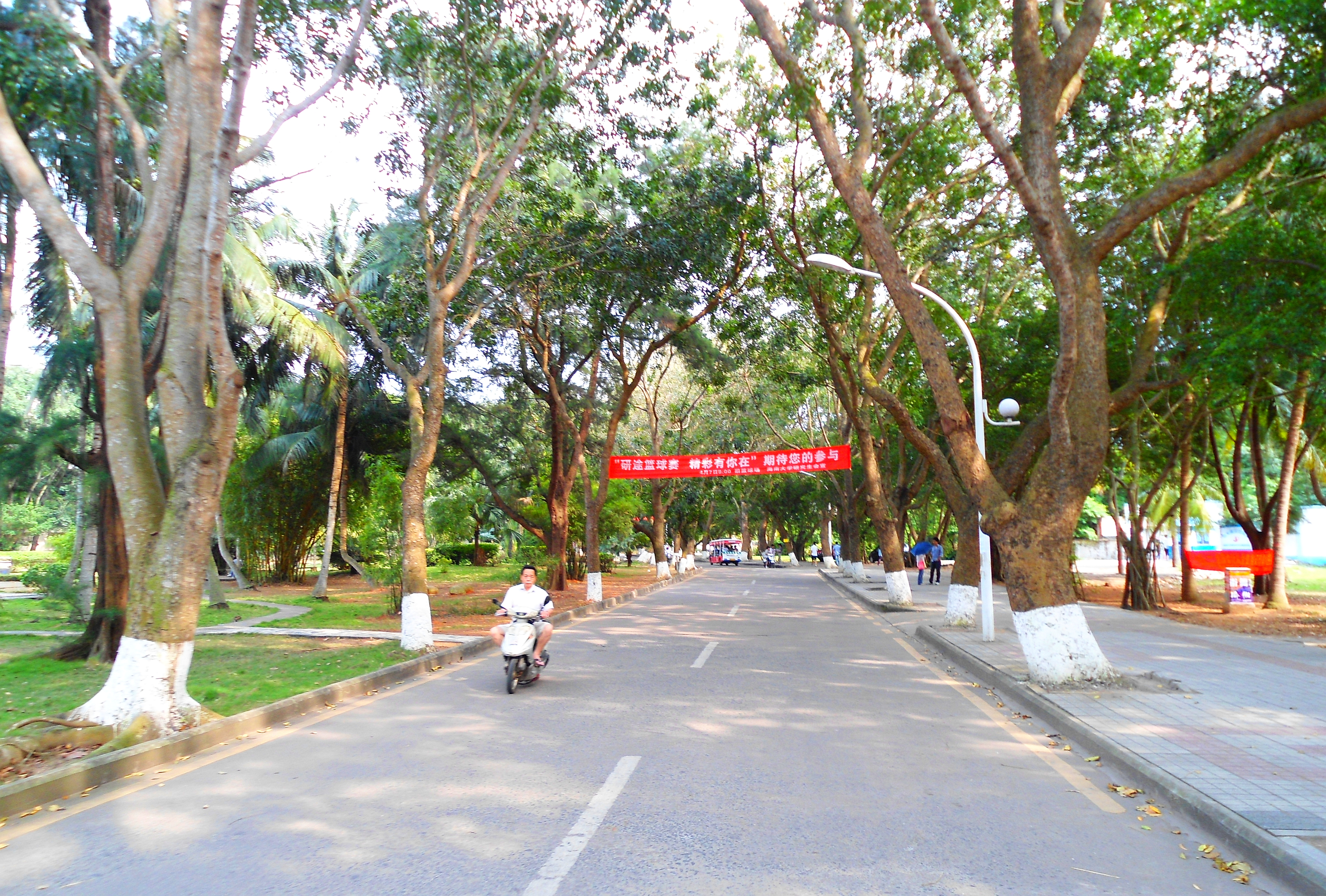

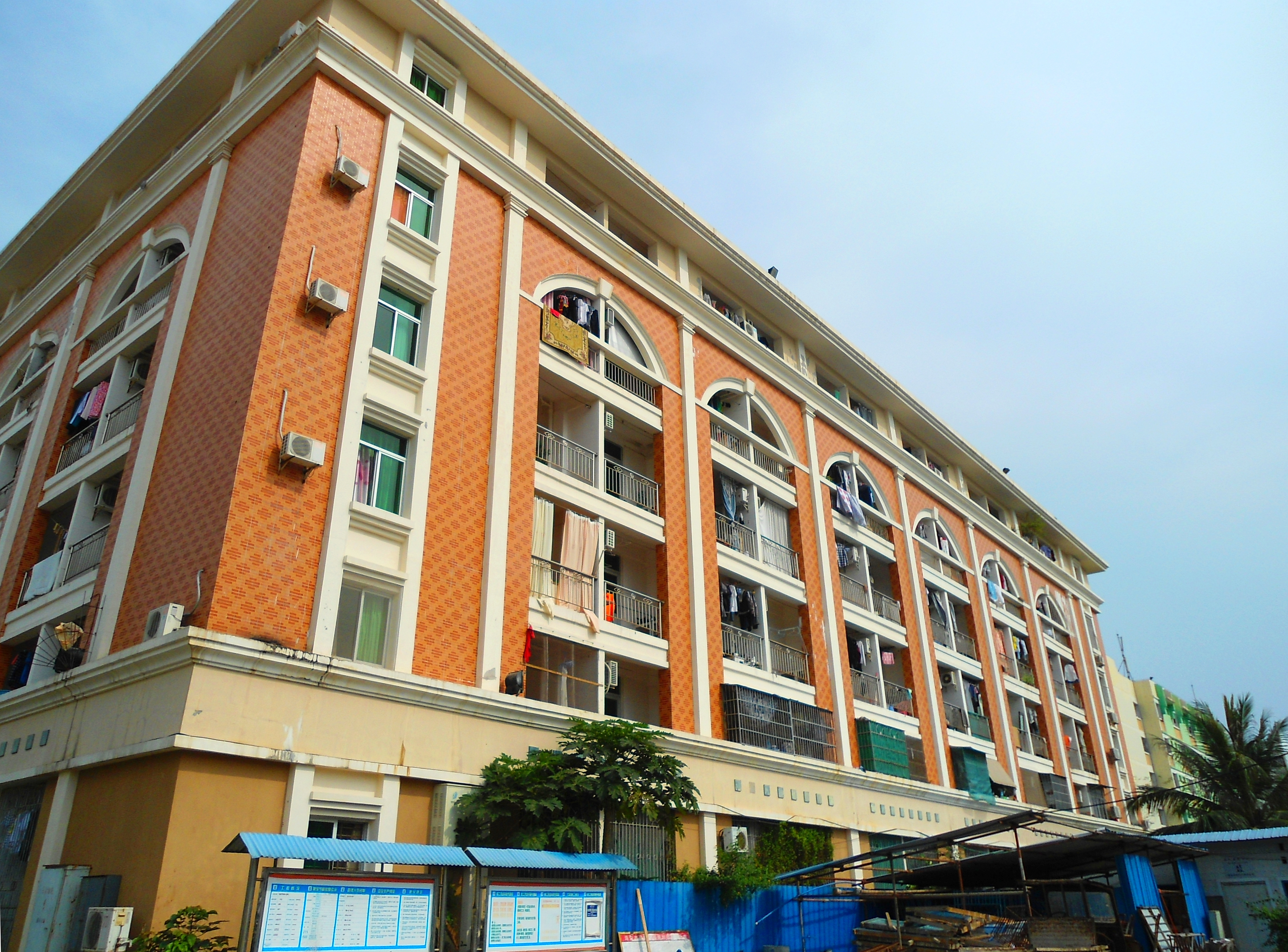

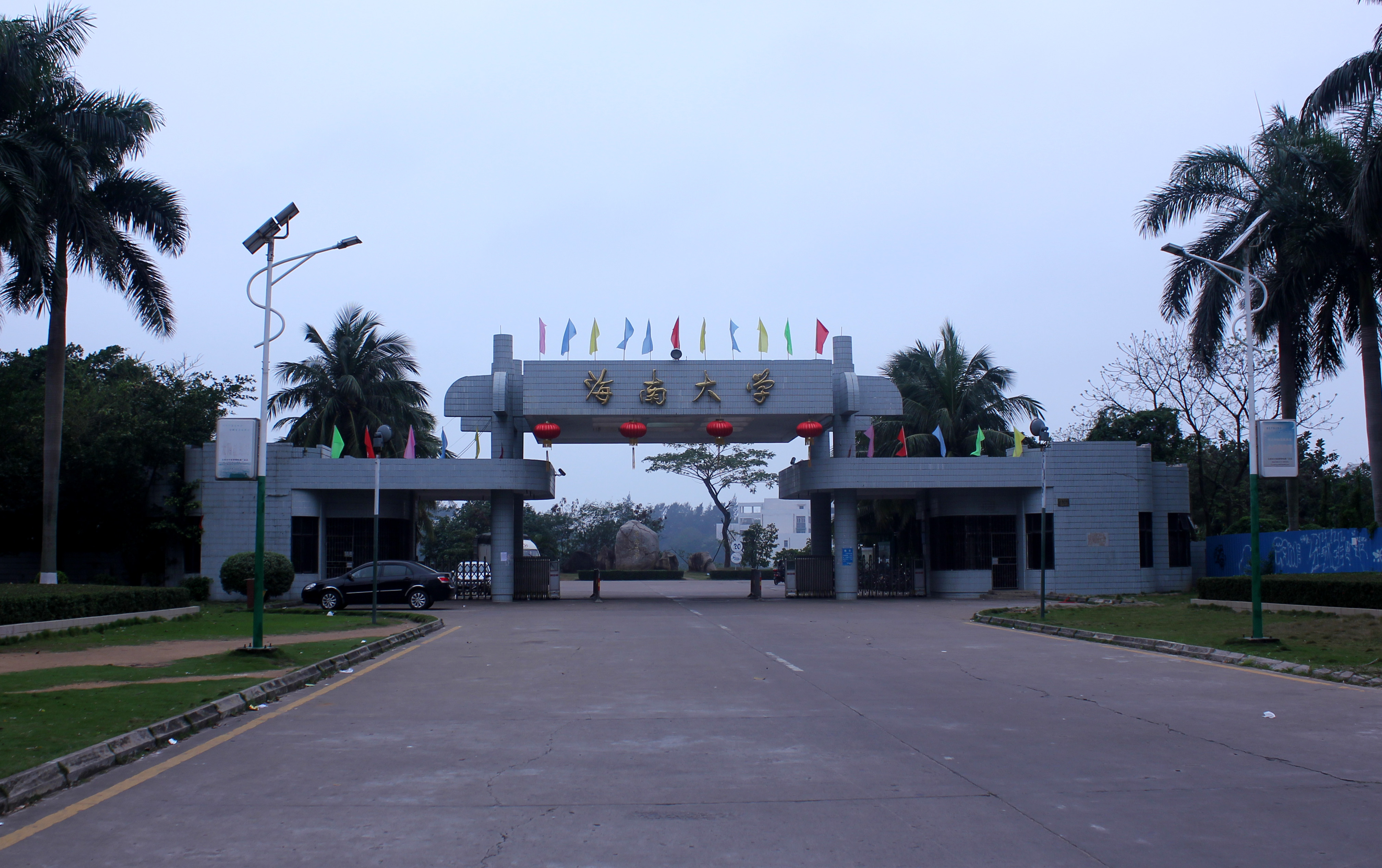

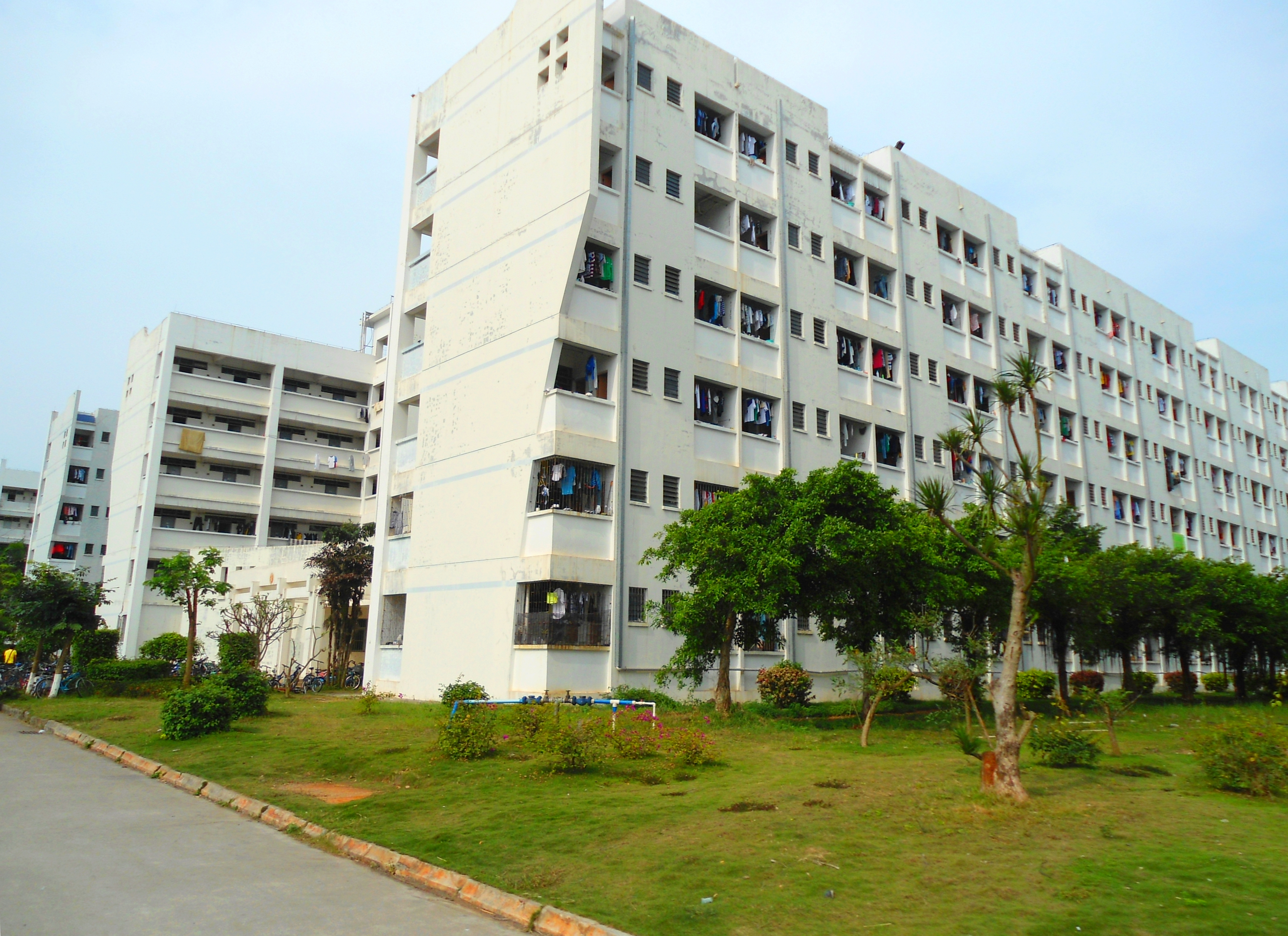

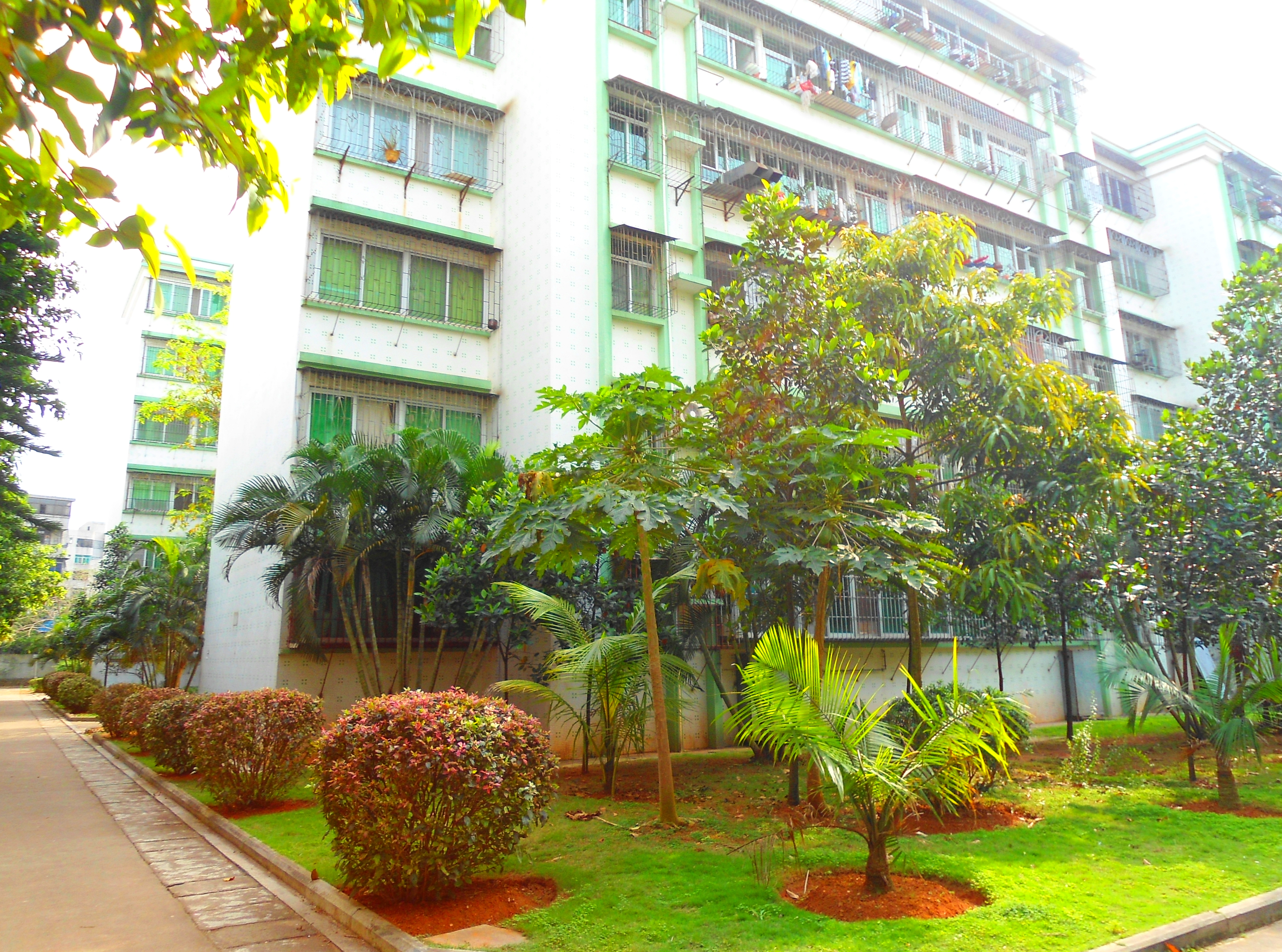

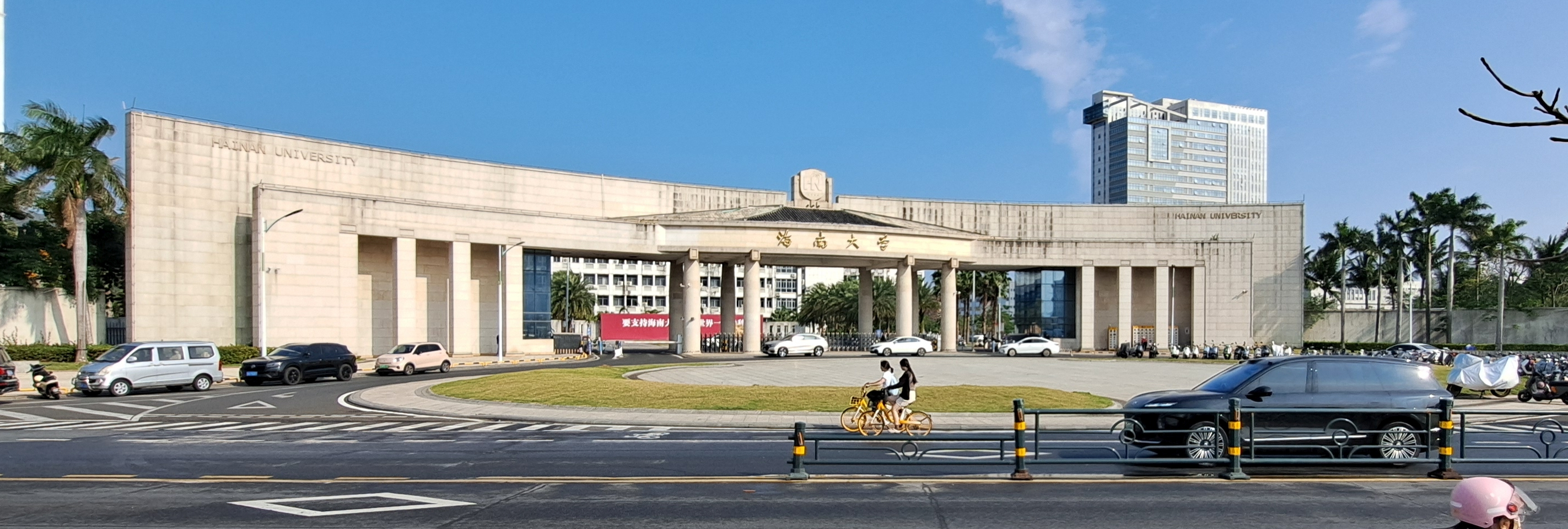

== See also ==
- Double First-Class Construction
- List of universities and colleges in Hainan
- List of universities in China
- Higher education in China
