= Longhua, Haikou =

Longhua 龙华区
- District
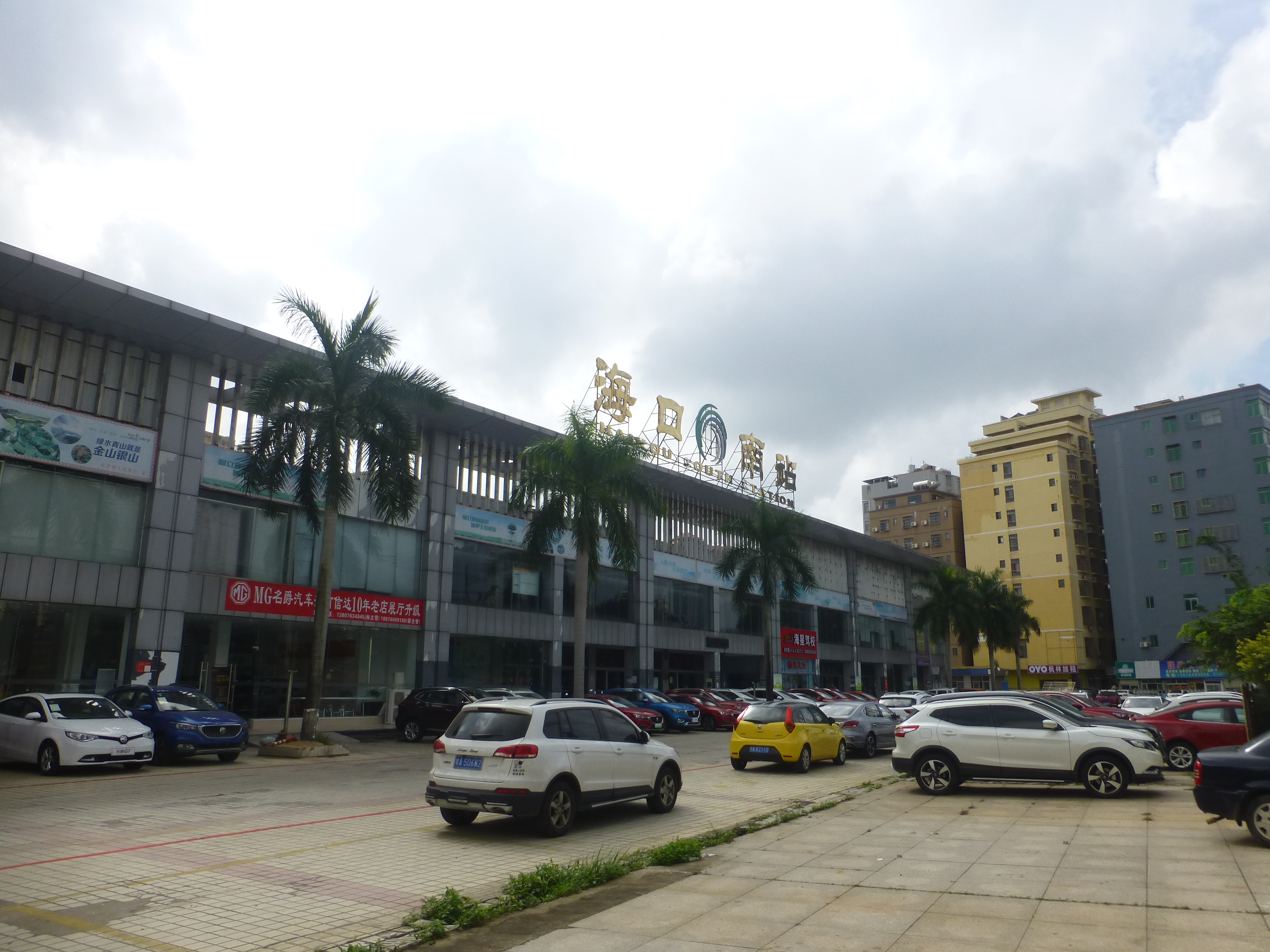

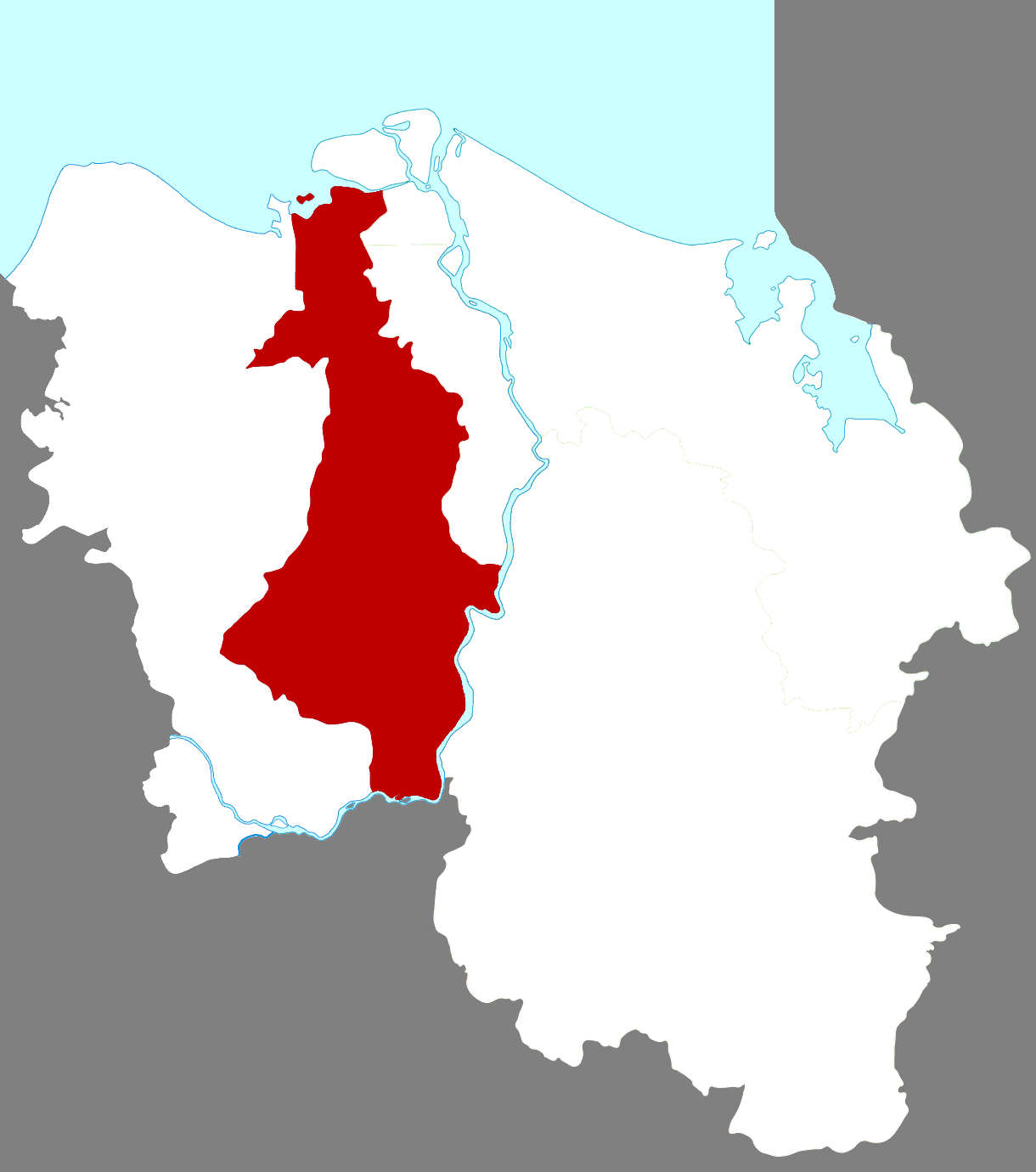
- Location of Longhua District Prefecture within Haikou
- Coordinates: 20°1′33″N 110°19′1″E
- Country: People's Republic of China
- Province: Hainan
- Prefecture-level city: Haikou

Area
  - Total: 302.49 km^{2} (116.79 sq mi)

Population (2010)
  - Total: 593,018
  - Density: 1,960.5/km^{2} (5,077.6/sq mi)
- Time zone: UTC+8 (China standard time)
- Area code: 0898

Longhua (simplified Chinese: 龙华区; traditional Chinese: 龍華區; pinyin: Lónghuá Qū) is a district in Haikou City, Hainan. The district's total area is 302.49 km^{2} (117 sq mi), and its population was 593,018 people in 2010. The district has 11 sub divisions - 5 towns and 6 sub-districts.

The Mission Hills Haikou golf course (and Ritz-Carlton Haikou hotel), which is regarded as one of the best golf courses in China, is located within this district.
