= List of shipwrecks in 2016 =

The list of shipwrecks in 2016 includes ships sunk, foundered, grounded, or otherwise lost during 2016.

table of contents
2016
Jan	Feb	Mar	Apr
May	Jun	Jul	Aug
Sep	Oct	Nov	Dec
Unknown date

== January ==
=== 4 January ===
List of shipwrecks: 4 January 2016
Ship	State	Description
Barbie	Marshall Islands	The motor yacht was severely damaged by fire at Marmaris, Turkey.
The One	Portugal	The motor yacht was severely damaged by fire at Marmaris.

=== 7 January ===
List of shipwrecks: 7 January 2016
Ship	State	Description
Zuhairi	Malaysia	The ferry collided with an unlit barge and partially sank off Semporna. All 156 passengers and crew were rescued, with 22 of them requiring treatment in hospital. The barge is believed to have sunk.

=== 8 January ===
List of shipwrecks: 8 January 2016
Ship	State	Description
China Star 107	China	The bulk carrier foundered in the East China Sea 3 nautical miles (5.6 km) north of East Fuzhou Island. Her five crew were missing as of 12 January.

=== 10 January ===
List of shipwrecks: 10 January 2016
Ship	State	Description
City	Panama	The cargo ship was driven ashore and wrecked at Sakata, Yamagata, Japan. Her eighteen crew were rescued by a Japan Coast Guard helicopter.

=== 13 January ===
List of shipwrecks: 13 January 2016
Ship	State	Description
Ocean Wind	United States	The retired 82-foot (25 m) tug was scuttled in 82 feet (25 m) of water in the Gulf of Mexico off Escambia County, Florida, 10 nautical miles (19 km; 12 mi) southeast of Pensacola Pass at 30°10.99′N 87°12.025′W to form an artificial reef.

=== 16 January ===
List of shipwrecks: 16 January 2016
Ship	State	Description
Fu Long	Panama	The bulk carrier was abandoned in the Philippine Sea 100 nautical miles (190 km) east of Taiwan (23°23′N 122°58′E).
Sunway Maru	Japan	The coastal tanker collided with Daifuku Maru No. 8 (Japan) and sank in Tokyo Bay. Her three crew were rescued.

=== 18 January ===
List of shipwrecks: 18 January 2016
Ship	State	Description
USS Reuben James	United States Navy	The decommissioned Oliver Hazard Perry-class guided-missile frigate was sunk as a target in the Pacific Ocean near Hawaii by a Standard Missile 6 (SM-6) fired by the guided-missile destroyer USS John Paul Jones ( United States Navy).
PeeJay V	New Zealand	The excursion passenger vessel PeeJay V, owned and operated by White Island Tours, caught fire and burned to the waterline off the Whakatāne Bar. One crew member was treated for smoke inhalation, there were no fatalities. The NZ Transport Accident Investigation Commission found that the carbon dioxide fixed fire-fighting system installed in the engine room could not be fully effective in extinguishing the fire because the space it was protecting could not be fully closed down.

=== 20 January ===
List of shipwrecks: 20 January 2016
Ship	State	Description
Hua Xin 858	China	The cargo ship caught fire in the Bohai Sea off Yingkou and was abandoned.
Sabuk Nusantara 49	Indonesia	The ferry caught fire in the Savu Sea off Kupang. Her 81 passengers were evacuated. She was on a voyage from Kupang to North Malaku.

=== 22 January ===
List of shipwrecks: 22 January 2016
Ship	State	Description
VFM Alita	Panama	The cargo ship collided with another vessel off Colón, Panama and sank. Her crew survived.

=== 25 January ===
List of shipwrecks: 25 January 2016
Ship	State	Description
Dong Thien Phu Silver	Vietnam	The cargo ship collided with Ocean Osprey (Dominica) off the coast of Burma and sank. Her fourteen crew were rescued.
Xin Yang	China	The cargo ship was driven ashore on Dangan Island, Hong Kong. Her six crew were rescued.

=== 26 January ===
List of shipwrecks: 26 January 2016
Ship	State	Description
Modern Express	Panama	The car carrier developed a severe list in the Bay of Biscay 148 nautical miles (274 km) off Cape Ortegal, Spain. Her 22 crew were evacuated by helicopter. Modern Express proceeded to drift for several days, and was sighted off the coast of France, but was successfully taken under tow by the tug Centaurus (Spain) on 1 February. She arrived at Bilbao, Spain on 3 February. Modern Express was declared a total loss. She departed under tow on 20 September for scrapping at Aliağa, Turkey.

=== 29 January ===
List of shipwrecks: 29 January 2016
Ship	State	Description
New Mykonos	Panama	The bulk carrier ran aground south of Faux Cap, Madagascar. She broke in two and sank between 9 and 16 May.

=== 31 January ===
List of shipwrecks: 31 January 2016
Ship	State	Description
Sabuk Nusantara 55	Indonesia	The ro-ro ferry ran aground on a reef off Pulau Pamalikan. She was on a voyage from Kotabaru to Pulau Sembilan.

== February ==
=== 2 February ===
List of shipwrecks: 2 February 2016
Ship	State	Description
South Star	Mongolia	The cargo ship was severely damaged by fire in Tonkin Bay, Vietnam. Her eighteen crew were evacuated.

=== 3 February ===
List of shipwrecks: 3 February 2016
Ship	State	Description
Amur 2516	Moldova	The cargo ship was holed by ice in the Azov Sea and was beached at Dolzhanskaya, Russia. She was on a voyage from Azov, Russia to Ambarli, Turkey.
CSCL Indian Ocean	Hong Kong	CSCL Indian Ocean. The container ship ran aground in the Elbe. She was refloated on 9 February and taken in to Hamburg.

=== 6 February ===
List of shipwrecks: 6 February 2016
Ship	State	Description
Condor	Germany	The 16.1-metre (52 ft 10 in) fishing vessel capsized in the Baltic Sea 3.5 miles (5.6 km) east of Fehmarn Island and sank (54°25′N 11°24′W). Her two crew both died. The wreck was raised on 7 March 2016 and was scrapped.

=== 11 February ===
List of shipwrecks: 11 February 2016
Ship	State	Description
414	United States Navy	The 34-foot (10 m) Dauntless-class patrol vessel ran aground at the mouth of the St. John River at Jacksonville, Florida. Her five crew were rescued.

=== 12 February ===
List of shipwrecks: 14 or 15 February 2016
Ship	State	Description
KM Azula	Indonesia	The tanker foundered in the Arafura Sea off Papua, Indonesia. At least thirteen crew were missing as of 17 February.

=== 13 February ===
List of shipwrecks: 13 February 2016
Ship	State	Description
Nusantara Akbar	Indonesia	The tanker sprang a leak and foundered in the Strait of Malacca off Dumai with the loss of one of her 27 crew.

=== 16 February ===
List of shipwrecks: xx February 2016
Ship	State	Description
Emily Anne	United States	The tug foundered off Deer Island, Massachusetts. Her three crew were rescued.

=== 18 February ===
List of shipwrecks: 18 February 2016
Ship	State	Description
KM Linasbelawan	Indonesia	The cargo ship caught fire in the Java Sea off the Maselembo Islands. Her nineteen crew were rescued. She was on a voyage from Jakarta to Makassar.
Lady Mary Joy 1	Mongolia	The cargo liner ran aground at Pampat Point, Bongao Island, Philippines. All 308 passengers were evacuated. She was on a voyage from Zamboanga to Bongao.

=== 20 February ===
List of shipwrecks: 20 February 2016
Ship	State	Description
Ha Tien 1	Vietnam	The cargo ship was abandoned off Da Nang (16°39′N 107°56′E). Her twenty crew were rescued.
Sinu-iwasa	Fiji	Cyclone Winston: The ferry capsized.
Sinu-i-wasa Tolu	Fiji	Cyclone Winston: The ferry capsized.
Spirit of Altruism	Fiji	Cyclone Winston: The ferry was driven aground off Natovi.
Spirit of Love	Fiji	Cyclone Winston: The ferry was driven aground off Natovi.
Westerland	Fiji	Cyclone Winston: The 58-metre (190 ft) ferry was driven ashore on Mosquito Island, Suva harbor in Lami Bay, Fiji. Refloated, repaired and returned to service sometime before December, 2018.

=== 21 February ===
List of shipwrecks: 21 February 2016
Ship	State	Description
Aurora Australis	Australia	The icebreaker drifted ashore at West Arm in Horseshoe Harbour, Antarctic during a blizzard. Thirty-seven passengers have been transferred to Mawson Station, while the remaining thirty-one crew attempted to refloat the ship. Aurora Australis was refloated on 27 February.

=== 25 February ===
List of shipwrecks: 25 February 2016
Ship	State	Description
New Katerina	Panama	The bulk carrier ran aground and sank at the bow in the Suez Canal. She was refloated on 9 March.
Yun Hai	Taiwan	The ro-ro ship ran aground in the Strait of Taiwan off Penghu Island. All eleven crew were rescued by helicopter.

=== 27 February ===
List of shipwrecks: 27 February 2016
Ship	State	Description
Ocean Dream	Togo	The abandoned cruise ship capsized off Laem Chebang, Thailand. Nobody was on board at the time. Later the above water section was demolished.

=== 28 February ===
List of shipwrecks: 28 February 2016
Ship	State	Description
KMP Swarna Bahtera	Indonesia	The ferry developed a severe list at Nusatara Parepare and was reported to be in danger of sinking.

=== 29 February ===
List of shipwrecks: 29 February 2016
Ship	State	Description
LC Mahalia	Vanuatu	The landing craft capsized in the Pacific Ocean north of Erromango (18°33′S 168°44′E). Her thirteen crew were rescued by Forum Pacific (Singapore).
New Mykonos	Panama	The bulk carrier ran aground south of Faux Cap, Madagascar (25°39′S 45°29′E). She was on a voyage from Richards Bay, South Africa to Vizag, India. She was declared a total loss.

== March ==
=== 1 March ===
List of shipwrecks: 1 March 2016
Ship	State	Description
Bao Jiang 88	China	The bulk carrier capsized and sank in the Yangtze near Shanghai. Her twelve crew were rescued by the Chinese Coast Guard.

=== 3 March ===
List of shipwrecks: xx March 2016
Ship	State	Description
Tatsu Maru No. 61	Japan	The cargo ship was driven ashore and wrecked at Kashiwajima. Her five crew were rescued.

=== 4 March ===
List of shipwrecks: 4 March 2016
Ship	State	Description
Rafelia 2	Indonesia	The ferry capsized and sank in the Bali Strait off Banyuwani. Four of the 75 people on board were reported missing.

=== 6 March ===
List of shipwrecks: 6 March 2016
Ship	State	Description
Kapan Wainami	Indonesia	The ferry was driven ashore in Wondama Bay. All 39 people on board survived. She was on a voyage from Nabire to Wondama Bay.

=== 7 March ===
List of shipwrecks: 7 March 2016
Ship	State	Description
Ayu Lestari	Indonesia	The tug was in collision with the tanker Mare Tirrenum (Italy) in the Strait of Malacca 5 nautical miles (9.3 km) south of Pulau Rupat and sank. Two of her four crew were reported missing.
Bo Feng You Gong 10	China	The tanker caught fire in Dalian Bay. Her crew were evacuated.

=== 10 March ===
List of shipwrecks: 10 March 2016
Ship	State	Description
Sagitaire	France	The trawler sank at Town Quay, Dartmouth, Devon, United Kingdom.
St Christophe	France	The trawler sank at Town Quay, Dartmouth, Devon.

=== 11 March ===
List of shipwrecks: 11 March 2016
Ship	State	Description
TS Taipei	Taiwan	The container ship ran aground off Shimen, Taiwan. Her 21 crew were rescued. On 25 March, it was reported that the hull had suffered a major rupture and had broken in two. The stern section was removed in late July and the bow section in early August.

=== 12 March ===
List of shipwrecks: 12 March 2016
Ship	State	Description
Magtymguly	Turkmenistan	The cargo ship struck a submerged object in the Volga River and was beached. She was on a voyage from Olya, Russia to Nowshahr, Iran.
Specialist	United States	The 84-foot (26 m) tug ran into an anchored barge on the Hudson River at the Tappan Zee Bridge, Tarrytown, New York and sank in 40 feet (12 m) of water. The wreck was raised on 24 March. All three crew on board were killed.

=== 14 March ===
List of shipwrecks: 14 March 2016
Ship	State	Description
Lu Yan Yuan Yu 010	China	The fishing vessel was sunk by the Argentinian coastguard for illegal fishing in Argentine waters. The thirty-two crew were rescued.
Viking	Nigeria	The fishing vessel, having been seized the previous month by the Indonesian Navy for illegal fishing, was scuttled.

=== 15 March ===
List of shipwrecks: 15 March 2016
Ship	State	Description
Shen Zhou 33	China	The cargo ship capsized and sank in the Taiwan Strait off Chongwu. Her six crew were rescued.

=== 17 March ===
List of shipwrecks: 17 March 2016
Ship	State	Description
HMS Bronington	Royal Navy	The Ton-class minesweeper sank at Birkenhead, Merseyside

=== 21 March ===
List of shipwrecks: 21 March 2016
Ship	State	Description
Selvamatha	India	The cargo ship foundered in the Laccadive Sea off the coast of Kerala. Her crew survived.
Sparna	Panama	The bulk carrier ran aground in the Columbia River and was severely damaged.

=== 23 March ===
List of shipwrecks: 23 March 2016
Ship	State	Description
KM Bunga Melati XV	Panama	The cargo ship struck a reef and sank at Tagulandang, Indonesia. Her eighteen crew were rescued.

=== 31 March ===
List of shipwrecks: 31 March 2016
Ship	State	Description
Paraguay Line	Paraguay	The cargo ship ran aground in the Paraná River. She was still aground on 8 April.

=== Unknown date ===
List of shipwrecks: Unknown date in March 2016
Ship	State	Description
Unidentified submarine	Korean People's Navy	An unidentified submarine was reported to have sunk off the coast of North Korea in early March.

== April ==
=== 1 April ===
List of shipwrecks: 1 April 2016
Ship	State	Description
Wanluijianghou	China	The cargo ship collided with Hua Lun 2788 (China) and sank in the Huangpu River. A crew member was reported missing.
Xiang Wang Cai 17	China	The dredger collided with Makassar Highway (Panama) off Zhangzhou and was damaged. Her nine crew were rescued.

=== 6 April ===
List of shipwrecks: 6 April 2016
Ship	State	Description
Wan Mu Chan 15	China	The cargo ship ran aground in the East China Sea (26°25′N 120°11′E) and was holed. Her fourteen crew were rescued. She was later refloated.

=== 9 April ===
List of shipwrecks: 9 April 2016
Ship	State	Description
Unnamed migrant ship		The trawler carrying more than three hundred migrants and towing a fishing boat with two hundred migrants capsized off the coast of Egypt. The fishing boat left the area leaving around one hundred people still alive. More than five hundred drowned.

=== 13 April ===
List of shipwrecks: xx April 2016
Ship	State	Description
Sinu-I-Wasa	Fiji	Cyclone Winston: The ferry was driven ashore at Levuka or Toki.
Sinu-I-Wasa-Tolu	Fiji	Cyclone Winston: The ferry was driven ashore at Levuka or Toki.
Spirit of Altruism	Fiji	Cyclone Winston: The ferry was driven ashore at Natovi.
Spirit of Love	Fiji	Cyclone Winston: The ferry was driven ashore at Natovi.
Westerland	Fiji	Cyclone Winston: The ferry was driven ashore at Suvasuva.

=== 17 April ===
List of shipwrecks: 17 April 2016
Ship	State	Description
Ocean Tango	South Korea	The car carrier was driven ashore at Busan.

=== 19 April ===
List of shipwrecks: 19 April 2016
Ship	State	Description
Ricky J Leboeuf	United States	The tug capsized in the San Jacinto River. One of her five crew was reported missing.

=== 20 April ===
List of shipwrecks: 20 April 2016
Ship	State	Description
Nova Cura	Netherlands	The cargo ship ran aground north of Lesbos, Greece. She was on a voyage from Istanbul to Aliağa, Turkey. Her seven crew and an insurer's representative were evacuated on 26 April, leaving five salvage assessors on board.
Zhe Hai 168	China	The cargo ship ran aground in the South China Sea north of Palawan Island, Philippines (9°31′N 118°20′E). She was still aground on 25 April.

=== 23 April ===
List of shipwrecks: 23 April 2016
Ship	State	Description
Nova Cura	Netherlands	The ship ran aground in the Müsellim Passage off Çanakkale, Turkey. Her crew were evacuated by helicopter on 27 April. Nova Cura was refloated on 6 May.
Palflot-2	Russia	The tanker caught fire in the Caspian Sea with the loss of one of her eleven crew. Survivors were rescued by helicopter.
Shao Dong Ji 958	China	The cargo ship caught fire near Suzhou. Her crew were evacuated.

=== 26 April ===
List of shipwrecks: 26 April 2016
Ship	State	Description
Panagia Tinou	Greece	The passenger ferry sank at Piraeus, where she had been laid up since 2015. Nobody was on board at the time.

=== 28 April ===
List of shipwrecks: 28 April 2016
Ship	State	Description
Last Stand	United States	The 42-foot (12.8 m) scallop-fishing boat capsized and sank in the Atlantic Ocean just east of Cape May, New Jersey, 60 seconds after colliding with the southward-bound 78-foot (23.8 m) tug Dean Reinauer (United States), which was pushing a 500-foot (152.4 m) barge. Wearing survival suits, Last Stand′s crew of three abandoned ship in a life raft and was rescued by a United States Coast Guard patrol boat 10 minutes after Last Stand sank.
HMBS Trident	Barbados Coast Guard	The decommissioned patrol vessel was scuttled in 70 to 80 feet (21 to 24 m) of water in Carlisle Bay off the coast of Barbados for use as a recreational diving site.

=== 29 April ===
List of shipwrecks: 29 April 2016
Ship	State	Description
Krasnoyarsk	Russian Navy	The Oscar-class submarine caught fire at Vilyuchinsk and was scuttled.

== May ==
=== 4 May ===
List of shipwrecks: 4 May 2016
Ship	State	Description
Tamaya 1	Nigeria	The tanker came ashore burnt out and crewless near Robertsport, Liberia.

=== 5 May ===
List of shipwrecks: 5 May 2016
Ship	State	Description
KM Sabuk Nusantara 46	Indonesia	The ferry ran aground off Pulau Gosong Island. Her 115 passengers were evacuated.

=== 7 May ===
List of shipwrecks: 7 May 2016
Ship	State	Description
Safmarine Meru	Hong Kong	The container ship collided with Northern Jasper (Germany) 120 nautical miles (220 km; 140 mi) east of Ningbo, China, and caught fire. Her 22 crew were evacuated onto Northern Jasper. Safmarine Meru was later towed in to Ningbo.

=== 9 May ===
List of shipwrecks: 9 May 2016
Ship	State	Description
Zhenpeng	China	The tanker collided with Yanzhan 58 (China) in the Pearl River and was beached. Her 15 crew were evacuated.

=== 21 May ===
List of shipwrecks: 21 May 2016
Ship	State	Description
AST Legend	Indonesia	Cyclone Roanu: The tug was driven ashore at Patenga.
Banglar Shikha	Bangladesh	Cyclone Roanu: The cargo ship was driven ashore at Chittagong, India.
Span Asia 17	Maldives	Cyclone Roanu: The cargo ship was driven ashore at Sitakunda, India.

=== 27 May ===
List of shipwrecks: 27 May 2016
Ship	State	Description
Roger Blough	United States	The lake freighter ran aground in Whitefish Bay, Lake Superior. She was refloated on 4 June.

=== 30 May ===
List of shipwrecks: 20 May 2016
Ship	State	Description
Pati Unus	Indonesian Navy	The Parchim-class corvette struck a sunken wreck in the Malacca Strait and sank in shallow water.
Shengyuan 58	China	The cargo ship was severely damaged by fire in the Yangtze River near Chongqing. Her eight crew were rescued.

=== 31 May ===
List of shipwrecks: 31 May 2016
Ship	State	Description
Amadeus Amethist	Netherlands	The cargo ship became trapped under a bridge over the Albert Canal at Antwerp, Belgium and was damaged. She was on a voyage from Antwerp to Genk.
ARA Espora; Saturn	Argentine Navy; Marshall Islands	The Espora-class corvette ARA Espora collided with the tanker Saturn off Puerto Belgrano. Both vessels were damaged.
Noorderlicht	Netherlands	The schooner ran aground on Vlieland, Friesland. Her 28 passengers were taken off by a KNRM rescue boat.

== June ==
=== 1 June ===
List of shipwrecks: 1 June 2016
Ship	State	Description
Sheng Yuan 508	China	The cargo ship caught fire in the Yangtze at Chongqing and was severely damaged. Her eight crew were rescued.

=== 9 June ===
List of shipwrecks: 9 June 2016
Ship	State	Description
LCT Putri Sritanjung 1	Indonesia	The landing craft foundered in the Bali Strait off Java. Her crew survived.

=== 11 June ===
List of shipwrecks: 11 June 2016
Ship	State	Description
Chang Hang Feng Hai	China	The bulk carrier ran aground off Cagdianao, Philippines.

=== 13 June ===
List of shipwrecks: 13 June 2016
Ship	State	Description
Belle Rose	Philippines	The bulk carrier ran aground on the Monad Shoal, 4 nautical miles (7.4 km) off Malapascua Island, Philippines. She was refloated on 20 June.

=== 16 June ===
List of shipwrecks: 16 June 2016
Ship	State	Description
Masaccio	Italy	The high-speed passenger ferry struck a pier at Stromboli and partially sank. Her 117 passengers and six crew safely evacuated the vessel.
Ohio	United States	The retired 70-foot (21.3 m) barge was scuttled as an artificial reef in the North Atlantic Ocean 4.5 nautical miles (8.3 km; 5.2 mi) off Ocean City, New Jersey, at 39°9.993′N 074°34.095′W.
Tobacco Pointe	United States	The retired 89-foot (27.1 m) tug was scuttled as an artificial reef in 75 feet (23 m) of water in the North Atlantic Ocean east of Ocean City, New Jersey, at 39°14.038′N 074°12.568′W.

=== 17 June ===
List of shipwrecks: 17 June 2016
Ship	State	Description
Benita	Liberia	The bulk carrier ran aground at Le Bouchon, Mauritius following a fight amongst crew members. She was refloated on 25 July and taken under tow for Alang, India for scrapping. Benita foundered under tow and sank on 30 July 2016 whilst 93.5 nautical miles (173.2 km) off the coast of Mauritius. As of February 2017, the ship's insurer, the London P&I Club expected gross claims mostly in liability to the salvor, to be only around US$15m.

=== 18 June ===
List of shipwrecks: 18 June 2016
Ship	State	Description
Nusantara Dolphin 1	Indonesia	The cargo ship foundered in the Java Sea off Tanjung Putting with the loss of two of her fifteen crew. Twelve were rescued, one was reported missing. She was on a voyage from Gresik to Kumai.
Ursa Major	Italy	The tug caught fire off Gioia Tauro. Her thirteen crew were rescued by the Italian Coast Guard.

=== 27 June ===
List of shipwrecks: 27 June 2016
Ship	State	Description
Macuti	Mozambique	The dredger was in collision with MSC Chiara (Panama) and was beached at Beira.

=== 28 June ===
List of shipwrecks: 28 June 2016
Ship	State	Description
Juan Yun 1	China	The cargo ship capsized and sank in the Yangtze River at Yueyang. Nine of her eleven crew were rescued, two were reported missing.

== July ==
=== 5 July ===
List of shipwrecks: 5 July 2016
Ship	State	Description
Hansita V	India	The dredger was driven ashore near Kollam.

=== 9 July ===
List of shipwrecks: 9 July 2016
Ship	State	Description
Johanna	Norway	The sailing ship sprang a leak and was beached at Nesoddtangen, Norway, where she sank. All 156 passengers and crew were rescued.

=== 10 July ===
List of shipwrecks: 10 July 2016
Ship	State	Description
Royal Iris of the Mersey	United Kingdom	The passenger ferry ran aground and partially sank at the entrance to the Manchester Ship Canal. All 75 passengers and crew were rescued by Deo Gloria (Netherlands).

=== 13 July ===
List of shipwrecks: 13 July 2016
Ship	State	Description
General Pereira D’Eça	Portuguese Navy	The decommissioned corvette was scuttled as an artificial reef off Porto Santo Island in the Madeira Islands.
Zhong Heng 9	China	The cargo ship collided with Chang Rong Men (China) and sank in the Yangtze River. Her fifteen crew were rescued.

=== 14 July ===
List of shipwrecks: 14 July 2016
Ship	State	Description
USS Thach	United States Navy	The decommissioned Oliver Hazard Perry-class guided-missile frigate was sunk as a target in the Pacific Ocean 55 nautical miles (102 km) north of Kauai, Hawaii, during the naval exercise RIMPAC 2016.

=== 15 July ===
List of shipwrecks: 15 July 2016
Ship	State	Description
Nica I	Malaysia	The container ship ran aground in the South China Sea (2°11′S 107°03′E). She was on a voyage from Esperance, Western Australia to Port Klang. She was refloated on 3 September and resumed her voyage.
Yamato Maru No.8	Japan	The cargo ship collided with Hoshu Maru (Japan) off Ueshima Island. She capsized and sank with the loss of two of her crew.

=== 18 July ===
List of shipwrecks: 18 July 2016
Ship	State	Description
Captain Ufuk	Philippines	The unmanned cargo ship sank in Manila Bay.

=== 19 July ===
List of shipwrecks: 19 July 2016
Ship	State	Description
USS Crommelin	United States Navy	The decommissioned Oliver Hazard Perry-class guided-missile frigate was sunk as a target in the Pacific Ocean north-northwest of Kauai, Hawaii, at approximately 23°00′N 159°55′W during the naval exercise RIMPAC 2016.
RFNS Kiro	(Fiji) Fijian Navy	The Pacific-class patrol boat ran aground on the Cakauyawa Reef, 6 nautical miles (11 km) off Makuluva Island and was severely damaged.

=== 20 July ===
List of shipwrecks: 20 July 2016
Ship	State	Description
HMS Ambush	Royal Navy	The Astute-class submarine collided with Andreas whilst submerged in the Strait of Gibraltar and was damaged.
Sorrento Jet	Italy	The ferry was severely damaged by fire at Marina di Veste. Arson was suspected.
Unilink II	Philippines	The cargo ship ran aground and sank in shallow water at Lapu-Lapu. Her crew survived.

=== 22 July ===
List of shipwrecks: 22 July 2016
Ship	State	Description
Thomas Dann	United States	The tug caught fire off Marineland, Florida. Her six crew were rescued by a fishing vessel.

== August ==
=== 1 August ===
List of shipwrecks: 1 August 2016
Ship	State	Description
LS-01	Brazil	The catamaran ferry was severely damaged by fire at Vicente de Carvalho.
Menina da Praia	Brazil	The high-speed catamaran passenger ferry was severely damaged by fire at Guaruja.

=== 2 August ===
List of shipwrecks: 2 August 2016
Ship	State	Description
Dabo 5	Indonesia	The tug was abandoned off Bintam Island. Her seven crew were rescued.

=== 3 August ===
List of shipwrecks: 3 August 2016
Ship	State	Description
American Eagle	United States	The schooner ran aground in Somes Sound, Maine. All 25 passengers were removed by the United States Coast Guard.
Dabo 5	Indonesia	The tug sprang a leak and was abandoned off the Riau Archipelago. Her seven crew were rescued by fishing vessels.

=== 6 August ===
List of shipwrecks: 6 August 2016
Ship	State	Description
Reaper	United Kingdom	The historic fishing vessel partially sank at Johnshaven, Aberdeenshire. She was later refloated.

=== 7 August ===
List of shipwrecks: xx August 2016
Ship	State	Description
Keihin Maru 8	Japan	The tanker collided with Eastern Phoenix (Panama) and partially sank 2 nautical miles (3.7 km) off Kehin. Her crew were rescued.

=== 8 August ===
List of shipwrecks: 8 August 2016
Ship	State	Description
Than Dat 01	Vietnam	The cargo ship collided with Guo Shun 21 (China) in the South China Sea and sank. Nine of her eleven crew were rescued.

=== 9 August ===
List of shipwrecks: 9 August 2016
Ship	State	Description
Angela Arcella	Italy	The fish farming vessel collided with Maria (Antigua and Barbuda) near Laboratory Wharf in the Grand Harbour, Malta, and it capsized. Two crewmen jumped into the sea and were rescued.
Med Star	Lebanon	The ro-ro ferry was severely damaged by fire at Tripoli, Lebanon.
New York Harbor Charlie	United States	The retired 65-foot (19.8 m) New York Police Department crew boat was scuttled as an artificial reef in the North Atlantic Ocean 2 nautical miles (3.7 km; 2.3 mi) off Mantoloking, New Jersey, in 80 feet (24 m) of water at 40°03.788′N 073°59.380′W.

=== 14 August ===
List of shipwrecks: 14 August 2016
Ship	State	Description
Tokay Akar	Turkey	The cargo ship was driven ashore at Samsun.

=== 15 August ===
List of shipwrecks: 15 August 2016
Ship	State	Description
Lady Gertrude	United States	The 72-foot (21.9 m) fishing trawler and scallop dredger suffered a broken propeller shaft, which caused her to flood, capsize, and sink three hours later in 135 feet (41 m) of water in the North Atlantic Ocean east of New Jersey. She reported her position within an hour of sinking as 40.06703°N 073.2793°W. Her entire crew of three survived.
Sirena	Portugal	The container ship was driven ashore at Sint Eustatius. She was on a voyage from Galisbay, Sint Maarten, to Martinique.

=== 17 August ===
List of shipwrecks: 17 August 2016
Ship	State	Description
Caribbean Fantasy	Panama	The ferry caught fire off San Juan. All 511 passengers and crew were disembarked before the ferry ran aground. She was refloated on 19 August and towed in to San Juan.
SG-25	(Turkey) Turkish Coast Guard	The ship collided with Tolunay (Cook Islands) and sank in the Bosphorus. One of her seven crew was reported missing.

=== 18 August ===
List of shipwrecks: 18 August 2016
Ship	State	Description
USS Louisiana	United States Navy	The Ohio-class submarine collided with USNS Eagleview ( United States Naval Service) in the Strait of Juan de Fuca. Both vessels were damaged.

=== 20 August ===
List of shipwrecks: 20 August 2016
Ship	State	Description
Alfa	Togo	The cargo ship developed a severe list off Yeosu, South Korea after her cargo shifted. All fifteen crew were evacuated by the South Korean Coast Guard. Alfa subsequently came ashore between Jeju and Tsushima Island.

=== 29 August ===
List of shipwrecks: 29 August 2016
Ship	State	Description
Espiritu Paraguayo	Chile	The tug struck a submerged object and sank in the Paraná River at Bella Vista, Buenos Aires, Argentina.

=== Unknown date ===
List of shipwrecks: Unknown August 2016
Ship	State	Description
Jaguar	Australia (?)	The 130.6-foot (39.8 m), 355-ton sailing ship, a converted trawler, dragged anchor and was wrecked, half sunk, on the rocks at Pulau Bumbong, Malasia.

== September ==
=== 3 September ===
List of shipwrecks: 3 September 2016
Ship	State	Description
Donbas	Ukrainian Navy	The command ship was damaged by fire at Odesa.
Saffet Bey	Turkey	The ro-ro ship ran aground at Lakonias, Greece. She was refloated on 7 September.

=== 4 September ===
List of shipwrecks: 4 September 2016
Ship	State	Description
Kurt C	Turkey	The sailing ship capsized and sank 2 nautical miles (3.7 km) off Antalya. Nine people were reported missing, 73 were rescued.
Liao He Yi Hao	China	The heavy lift ship suffered hogging and sank in shallow water north of Shanghai.

=== 9 September ===
List of shipwrecks: 9 September 2016
Ship	State	Description
Al Zaman	Iran	The cargo dhow capsized and sank in the Arabian Sea 96 nautical miles (178 km) off Ras Al Hadd. Her fifteen crew were rescued in a joint operation between the Oman Coast Guard and Royal Navy.
M Star 1	South Korea	The cargo ship sprang a leak and foundered in the Andaman Sea 25 nautical miles (46 km) south west of the "Great Western Torres Islands", Burma. Her fourteen crew were rescued by the tug Lewek (flag unknown).

=== 13 September ===
List of shipwrecks: xx September 2016
Ship	State	Description
Noorderlicht	Netherlands	The schooner ran aground at Trygghamna, Norway. She was refloated with assistance from Polarsyssel (Norway).

=== 14 September ===
List of shipwrecks: 14 September 2016
Ship	State	Description
Chengzing 012	China	Typhoon Meranti: The floating crane was abandoned in the Taiwan Strait. Her eight crew were rescued. Vessel presumed foundered.
Rigel A	Panama	The cargo ship sank in the Gulf of Aden off Mukalla, Yemen. Her eight crew were rescued by the Yemeni Coastguard.
Shun Tien No. 606	South Korea	Typhoon Meranti: The fishing trawler capsized and sank at Kaohsiung with the loss of one of her 22 crew.
YM Wind	Unflagged	Typhoon Meranti: The unfinished container ship was driven ashore at Kaohsiung, Taiwan, damaging two cranes and demolishing two others.
Yung Hsing Fa No. 168	South Korea	Typhoon Meranti: The fishing trawler capsized and sank at Kaohsiung.

=== 15 September ===
List of shipwrecks: 15 September 2016
Ship	State	Description
Gang Tai Tai Zhou	China	Typhoon Meranti: The container ship was driven ashore at Kinmen Island, Taiwan.
Heng Yu 9	China	Typhoon Meranti: The tanker was driven ashore in Quangzhou Bay. She was refloated the next day.

=== 18 September ===
List of shipwrecks: 18 September 2016
Ship	State	Description
Unknown	Thailand	The overloaded boat sank in Ayutthaya Province, Thailand in the Chao Phraya River. 26, including a child, drowned.

=== 19 September ===
List of shipwrecks: 19 September 2016
Ship	State	Description
Murat Hacibekiroglu II	Turkey	The cargo ship sprang a leak and foundered in the Mediterranean Sea north west of Cyprus. Her ten crew were rescued by Electra A (Turkey).
Wan Hai 307	Singapore	The container ship was damaged by fire at Hong Kong. She was on a voyage from Kaohsiung, Taiwan to Hong Kong.

=== 20 September ===
List of shipwrecks: 20 September 2016
Ship	State	Description
Domingue	Madagascar	The tug capsized and sank whilst assisting CMA CGM Simba (United Kingdom) at Tulear with the loss of two of her five crew.

=== 21 September ===
List of shipwrecks: 21 September 2016
Ship	State	Description
Austin	United States	The retired 68-foot (20.7 m) fishing trawler was scuttled as an artificial reef in the North Atlantic Ocean 2 nautical miles (3.7 km; 2.3 mi) off Mantoloking, New Jersey, in 80 feet (24 m) of water at 40°02.900′N 073°59.000′W.
Unidentified boat	Egypt	2016 Egypt migrant shipwreck: Carrying about 600 migrants, the boat capsized in the Mediterranean Sea off the coast of Egypt, killing an estimated 300 people. There were about 160 survivors, and 204 bodies were recovered.

=== 22 September ===
List of shipwrecks: 22 September 2016
Ship	State	Description
Danica Joy	Philippines	The passenger ferry capsized at Zamboanga due to errors in ballasting the vessel whilst it was being unloaded.

=== 23 September ===
List of shipwrecks: 23 September 2016
Ship	State	Description
Mustafa Kan	Panama	The cargo ship capsized in the Mediterranean Sea off Syracuse, Sicily, Italy. Her sixteen crew were rescued by the Italian Coast Guard. A Greek tug was tasked by the insurance company to bring the capsized ship to Cyrus. She was on a voyage from Dakar, Senegal to Šibenik, Croatia.

=== 24 September ===
List of shipwrecks: 24 September 2016
Ship	State	Description
Burgos	Mexico	The tanker caught fire in the Gulf of Mexico off Veracruz. Her 31 crew were evacuated.

=== 25 September ===
List of shipwrecks: 25 September 2016
Ship	State	Description
Hebrides	United Kingdom	The ferry ran aground at Lochmaddy, North Uist, Outer Hebrides.

=== 26 September ===
List of shipwrecks: 26 September 2016
Ship	State	Description
Kathleen	United States	The decommissioned tugboat was sunk as an artificial reef off St. Lucie County, Florida in 140 feet (43 m) of water.

=== 30 September ===
List of shipwrecks: 30 September 2016
Ship	State	Description
Nagoya	Indonesia	The cargo ship sank in shallow water in the Java Sea off Sumenep (7°10′S 114°17′E). Her fourteen crew were rescued. She was on a voyage from Banyuwangi to Lamongan.
Yowa Maru	Japan	The coaster, a tanker, struck a submerged object, sprang a leak and sank off Kudamatsu. Her four crew were rescued.

== October ==
=== 1 October ===
List of shipwrecks: 1 October 2016
Ship	State	Description
Swift	United Arab Emirates	Yemeni Civil War: The hybrid catamaran was attacked off the coast of Yemen by Houthis rebels. She was severely damaged.

=== 5 October ===
List of shipwrecks: 5 October 2016
Ship	State	Description
Kn. Donskoy	Russia	The passenger ship sprang a leak and sank at Zvenigovo.

=== 10 October ===
List of shipwrecks: 10 October 2016
Ship	State	Description
Carmen Ernestina	Venezuela	The ferry sprang a leak and partially sank at Puerto la Cruz.

=== 12 October ===
List of shipwrecks: 12 October 2016
Ship	State	Description
Asptr-1	Russia	The floating crane sprang a leak, capsized and sank in the Black Sea 1.5 nautical miles (2.8 km) off Livadiya, Ukraine with the loss of three of her eight crew.

=== 14 October ===
List of shipwrecks: 14 October 2016
Ship	State	Description
Dharma Kencarna VIII	Indonesia	The ro-ro ferry struck a reef and capsized in the Flores Sea off East Nusa Tenggara Island. All 121 passengers on board were rescued, as were the crew.
Nathan E Steward	Canada	The tug ran aground and partially sank off Bella Bella, British Columbia. It was recovered on November 14 of that year. The damage from running aground caused a large fuel spill.

=== 15 October ===
List of shipwrecks: 15 October 2016
Ship	State	Description
unnamed ferry	Myanmar	The ferry capsized on the Chindwin river killing 73 people. One hundred and fifty-nine passengers were rescued. Over 300 passengers were estimated to be on board, while the official capacity was 120.

=== 18 October ===
List of shipwrecks: 18 October 2016
Ship	State	Description
Su Jia Hang 1	China	The cargo ship was beached on Nanao Island.

=== 19 October ===
List of shipwrecks: 19 October 2016
Ship	State	Description
Baroasaa	Maldives	The refrigerated cargo ship caught fire off the Maldive Islands with the loss of one of her eighteen crew.
Feng Sheng You 8	China	The tanker caught fire at Dongfang City with the loss of two of her seventeen crew.

=== 20 October ===
List of shipwrecks: 20 October 2016
Ship	State	Description
Feng Sheng You 8	China	The tanker exploded and caught fire at Dongfang, Hainan with the loss of one of her seventeen crew. One crew member was reported missing.
Hong Xing 88	China	Typhoon Haima: The cargo ship foundered off Wenzhou. Her seven crew were rescued by the Chinese Coast Guard.
Silver Sky	Panama	The car carrier was damaged by fire at Antwerp, Belgium.

=== 21 October ===
List of shipwrecks: 21 October 2016
Ship	State	Description
Su Jia Hang 1	China	Typhoon Haima: The cargo ship was driven ashore near Shantou City.

=== 22 October ===
List of shipwrecks: 22 October 2016
Ship	State	Description
Long Hao 1	China	The cargo ship collided with Xin Zhou 18 (China) off Zhenjiang and capsized. Three of her crew were rescued by a fishing vessel.

=== 23 October ===
List of shipwrecks: 23 October 2016
Ship	State	Description
Fom	Panama	The cargo ship suffered an engine failure in the Black Sea and was abandoned by her crew. She was later towed to a port in Turkey.

=== 25 October ===
List of shipwrecks: 25 October 2016
Ship	State	Description
Jin Long Da 98	China	The tanker sprang a leak and foundered in the East China Sea. Her thirteen crew were rescued.

=== 29 October ===
List of shipwrecks: 29 October 2016
Ship	State	Description
USS Montgomery	United States Navy	The Independence-class littoral combat ship struck a lock wall and was holed in the Panama Canal.

== November ==
=== 1 November ===
List of shipwrecks: 1 November 2016
Ship	State	Description
KM Dewaruci Perkasa	Indonesia	The cargo ship collided with Dolphin Nusantara 2 and KM Trijaya (both Indonesia) and foundered off Gresik with the loss of four of her thirteen crew.

=== 2 November ===
List of shipwrecks: 2 November 2016
Ship	State	Description
Lisa Kim	United States	The retired 115-foot (35.1 m) fishing trawler was scuttled as an artificial reef in the North Atlantic Ocean off Wildwood, New Jersey, at 38°57.900′N 074°41.050′W.
Verano	Russia	The factory ship was severely damaged by fire at Cape Town, South Africa. Her five crew survived.

=== 3 November ===
List of shipwrecks: 3 November 2016
Ship	State	Description
Sumbar Bahagia Jaya	Indonesia	The landing craft partially sank in the Makassar Strait 47 nautical miles (87 km) off Cape Tanjung with the loss of two of her eleven crew.
Migrant vessel	Libya	Around 240 people were killed during the November 2016 Libya migrant shipwrecks

=== 4 November ===
List of shipwrecks: 3 November 2016
Ship	State	Description
Migrant vessel	Indonesia	At least 54 people were killed when a boat carrying migrant workers sunk.

=== 7 November ===
List of shipwrecks: 7 November 2016
Ship	State	Description
Masrour	Iran	The tanker sprang a leak and foundered in the Persian Gulf. Her twelve crew were rescued.

=== 9 November ===
List of shipwrecks: 9 November 2016
Ship	State	Description
Mina I	Turkey	The cargo ship was driven ashore at Maltepe, Turkey.

=== 10 November ===
List of shipwrecks: 10 November 2016
Ship	State	Description
Chang Rong 8	China	The container ship ran aground and was damaged in the Taiwan Strait off Dongjia Island (25°17′N 119°45′E). Seven of her sixteen crew were evacuated.

=== 14 November ===
List of shipwrecks: 14 November 2016
Ship	State	Description
Casanova	Colombia	The cargo ship was severely damaged by fire at Barranquilla.

=== 15 November ===
List of shipwrecks: 15 November 2016
Ship	State	Description
Casanova	Sao Tome and Principe	The cargo ship was severely damaged by fire at Barranquilla, Colombia.
Dumai Line 3	Indonesia	The ferry was beached on Pulau Pedang Island. All passengers were evacuated. She was on a voyage from Pulau Sambu to Dumai.
Navemar XII	Brazil	The cargo ship ran aground on a reef and sank in the Atlantic Ocean off Olinda. Her crew were rescued. She was on a voyage from Recife to Fernando de Noronha.

=== 16 November ===
List of shipwrecks: 16 November 2016
Ship	State	Description
KM Tradisi 8	Indonesia	The cargo ship capsized and sank at Gresik with the loss of one of her fourteen crew.

=== 17 November ===
List of shipwrecks: 17 November 2016
Ship	State	Description
Migrant vessel	Libya	At least one hundred people are believed to have drowned off the coast of Libya when their boat sank after they were abandoned off Libya without a motor. Twenty-seven survivors have been transported to Italy.

=== 20 November ===
List of shipwrecks: 20 November 2016
Ship	State	Description
Saga Sky	Hong Kong	Storm Angus: The 199-metre (653 ft) Hong Kong-registered general cargo vessel struck a barge full of rocks after losing engine power in high seas off Dover in the English Channel. Eleven of her crew were evacuated by UK Coast Guard helicopters, whilst 12 remained on board. A French tug was also sent to assist.

=== 22 November ===
List of shipwrecks: xx November 2016
Ship	State	Description
Lauri	Finland	The tug sank at Pargas.

=== 25 November ===
List of shipwrecks: 25 November 2016
Ship	State	Description
Araks	Russia	The refrigerated tanker ran aground in the Caspian Sea off Cape Sandy, Kazakhstan. She was still aground in January 2017.

=== 27 November ===
List of shipwrecks: xx November 2016
Ship	State	Description
Thuan Phat 8	Vietnam	The cargo ship foundered in the Gulf of Tonkin 30 nautical miles (56 km) off Quang Binh. Her eleven crew were rescued.

=== 28 November ===
List of shipwrecks: 28 November 2016
Ship	State	Description
Kanzam Express	Philippines	The catamaran passenger ferry sprang a leak and foundered off Itbayat Island with the loss of two of her seven crew. Survivors were rescued by Ingrid C (Marshall Islands).

=== 29 November ===
List of shipwrecks: 29 November 2016
Ship	State	Description
Hung Thai 17	Vietnam	The cargo ship capsized and sank in the South China Sea 1 nautical mile (1.9 km) off Vinh Son (17°57′N 106°30′E). Her ten crew were rescued.

== December ==
=== 2 December ===
List of shipwrecks: 2 December 2016
Ship	State	Description
Antaios	Liberia	The ship suffered an engine room fire in the Atlantic Ocean (34°10′S 0°59′E) and was abandoned. Her nineteen crew were rescued by NSU Empire (Panama). Antaios was subsequently taken in tow by the tug Smit Amandla (South Africa) and taken to Cape Town, South Africa.
Hilmi K	Turkey	The cargo ship was driven ashore at Kartal. Her crew were rescued.
Volgo-Don 203	Russia	The cargo ship was driven ashore and sank at Kartal. Her crew were rescued.

=== 3 December ===
List of shipwrecks: 3 December 2016
Ship	State	Description
Antaios	Liberia	The bulk carrier caught fire and sprang a leak in the Atlantic Ocean 860 nautical miles (1,590 km) west of Cape Town, South Africa and was abandoned. Her crew were rescued by NSU Inspire (Panama). Antaios was on a voyage from San Lorenzo, Argentina to Durban, South Africa. She was later taken in tow by the tug Smit Amandla (South Africa).
Muros	Spain	The cargo ship ran aground on the Haisborough Sands, in the North Sea off the coast of Norfolk, United Kingdom. She was on a voyage from Teesport, United Kingdom to Rochefort, Charente-Maritime, France. Muros was refloated on 9 December and towed to Rotterdam, South Holland, Netherlands for repairs.

=== 4 December ===
List of shipwrecks: 4 December 2016
Ship	State	Description
Volgo-Don 203	Russia	The cargo ship ran aground and sank in shallow water at Kartal, Turkey. Her fourteen crew were rescued.

=== 5 December ===
List of shipwrecks: 5 December 2016
Ship	State	Description
INS Betwa	Indian Navy	The Brahmaputra-class frigate capsized in a graving dock at Mumbai, killing two of her crew.
Cargo ship	Unknown	The ship foundered in the Arabian Sea whilst on a voyage from Mukallah to Socotra Island, Yemen with some loss of life. Thirty-five people were rescued.

=== 7 December ===
List of shipwrecks: 7 December 2016
Ship	State	Description
Exito	United States	The supply vessel foundered 14 nautical miles (26 km) north east of Dutch Harbor, Alaska. Two of her five crew were reported missing.

=== 9 December ===
List of shipwrecks: 9 December 2016
Ship	State	Description
Asko	Malta	The cargo ship ran aground and was damaged in Lake Malaren.

=== 12 December ===
List of shipwrecks: 12 December 2016
Ship	State	Description
Chong Gen	North Korea	The cargo ship capsized and sank in the East China Sea 30 nautical miles (56 km) south west off Fukue Island, Japan. Her 26 crew were rescued.

=== 14 December ===
List of shipwrecks: 14 December 2016
Ship	State	Description
Darin Darsab	India	The cargo ship ran aground, capsized and sank near Char Nurul Islam. Her crew were rescued.
Glorious Sreenagar	India	The cargo ship was run into by Titu (India) and capsized in the Hatiya Channel. Ten of her fourteen crew were rescued by the Indian Navy, two reached shore and two were reported missing.
Labs-1	India	The cargo ship was run into by another vessel and sank off Chittagong. Her thirteen crew were rescued.
Manju	India	The cargo ship sank off Patenga. Her fourteen crew were rescued.
Reia Faye	Philippines	The tanker caught fire and exploded in Manila Bay. Her crew abandoned ship and were rescued. Eighteen of them were injured.

=== 15 December ===
List of shipwrecks: 15 December 2016
Ship	State	Description
Hong Yuan 02	China	The container ship ran aground off Small Huanglong Island, off Zhoushan and partially sank in shallow water. Thirteen of her 21 crew were evacuated the next day. She was on a voyage from Humen to Jingtang.
Oscar V	Congo	The cargo ship Oscar V sank under bad weather inside of Alexandria port anchorage area. Her crew were rescued.

=== 23 December ===
List of shipwrecks: 23 December 2016
Ship	State	Description
Jouya 8	Iran	Yemeni Civil War: The cargo ship was sunk in the Red Sea off Hodeidah, Yemen by a rocket attack by Houthi rebels with the loss of all but one of her eight crew.
Maersk Searcher	Denmark	The offshore supply vessel capsized and sank in the Celtic Sea whilst under tow to Turkey to be scrapped.
Maersk Shipper	Denmark	The offshore supply vessel capsized and sank in the Celtic Sea whilst under tow to Turkey to be scrapped.
Sinaburg	Indonesia	The ferry ran aground in the Banda Sea off Tual. All passengers and crew were rescued.
Unknown fishing vessel	Vietnam	The fishing vessel was fired upon by a Papua New Guinea Defence Force patrol boat while being apprehended for illegal fishing. High explosive rounds penetrated gas cylinders that caused a fire and explosion, sinking the boat in Milne Bay near Budibudi Island in the Samarai-Murua District, Papua New Guinea. Her Captain was killed, rest of crew resxcued.

=== 24 December ===
List of shipwrecks: 24 December 2016
Ship	State	Description
Cabrera	Antigua and Barbuda	The cargo ship ran aground and sank on the north coast of Andros, Greece. Her nine crew were rescued by a Hellenic Navy helicopter. The wreck was removed in October 2017. Aft scrapped in Aliaga since 26 December 2017

=== 26 December ===
List of shipwrecks: 26 December 2016
Ship	State	Description
Alcatras	Turkey	The offshore supply vessel ran aground off Kos, Greece. Some of her crew abandoned ship, others remained aboard. Vessel was serving as a test bed for the Korkut air defense system.
Baleno 5	Philippines	Typhoon Nina: The ro-ro ferry was driven ashore at Puerto Galera.
Baleno 7	Philippines	Typhoon Nina: The ro-ro ferry was driven ashore at Puerto Galera.
Baleno 8	Philippines	Typhoon Nina: The ro-ro ferry was driven ashore at Puerto Galera.
Obama	Philippines	Typhoon Nina: The tanker was driven ashore at Gasan Marinduque.
OceanJet 10	Philippines	Typhoon Nina: The passenger ferry was driven ashore at Puerto Galera.
OceanJet 11	Philippines	Typhoon Nina: The passenger ferry was driven ashore at Puerto Galera.
Shuttle Roro 5	Philippines	Typhoon Nina: The ro-ro ferry was driven ashore at Matini, Batangas. All 25 passengers and crew were rescued.
Starlite Atlantic	Philippines	Typhoon Nina: The ro-ro ferry was driven ashore, capsized and sank off Barangay Corona with the loss of nine of the 23 people on board.
Starlite Ferry	Philippines	Typhoon Nina: ro-ro ferry was driven ashore at Puerto Galero.
Starlite Polaris	Philippines	Typhoon Nina: ro-ro ferry was driven ashore at Puerto Galero.

=== 28 December ===
List of shipwrecks: 28 December 2016
Ship	State	Description
La Bella	Philippines	The tug sank whilst assisting Gold Eagle (Panama) at Zamboanga. Both crew survived.

=== 31 December ===
List of shipwrecks: 31 December 2016
Ship	State	Description
Euro Uno	Philippines	The cargo ship was driven ashore at Misamis Oriental.
Güneyin	Turkey	The cargo ship was driven ashore at Kartal Kumcular Iskelesi. She was refloated.
Yakupaga	Turkey	The cargo ship was driven ashore at Kartal Kumcular Iskelesi. She was refloated.

== Unknown date ==
List of shipwrecks: Unknown date in 2016
Ship	State	Description
ARA Ingeniero Julio Krause	Argentine Navy	The tanker was sunk as a target in the Argentine Sea.
