= List of major power stations in Hainan province =

This article lists the major power stations located in Hainan Province.

== Coal ==
Station	Name in Chinese	Coordinates	Capacity (MW)	Operational units	Under construction units	Reference
Haikou Power Station	海口电厂	19°57′35″N 110°01′49″E	1,860	2×330 MW, 2×600 MW		
Dongfang Power Station	东方电厂	19°02′57″N 108°38′10″E	1,400	4×350 MW		
Hainan Southwest Power Station	海南西南部电厂	18°32′16″N 108°40′58″E	700	2×350 MW		
Jinhai Mill Power Station	金光集团金海浆纸业发电厂	19°46′24″N 109°11′02″E	300	2×150 MW		

== Natural gas ==
Station	Name in Chinese	Coordinates	Capacity (MW)	Operational units and (type)	Under construction units	Reference
Wanning Natural Gas Power Station	大唐万宁燃气电厂	18°54′44″N 110°22′21″E	920	2×460 MW		
Wenchang Natural Gas Power Station	文昌燃气电厂	19°47′18″N 110°43′00″E	920	2×460 MW		
Nanshan Power Station	南山电厂	18°19′7″N 109°9′46″E	920	2×460 MW		
Yangpu Natural Gas Power Station	洋浦燃气电厂	19°43′28″N 109°10′47″E	444	2×139 MW		

== Nuclear ==
Station	Name in Chinese	Coordinates	Capacity installed and underconstructed (MW)	Operational reactors and (type)	Under construction reactors	Reference
Changjiang Nuclear Power Plant	昌江核电站	19°27′31″N 108°53′56″E	1,300	2×650 MW (CNP600)		

== Renewable ==
=== Hydroelectric ===
==== Conventional ====
Station	Name in Chinese	Coordinates	River	Capacity (MW)	Dam height (meters)	Status	Units	Reference
Daguangba Hydropower Station	大广坝水电站	19°01′10″N 108°56′46″E	Changhua	240	57	Operational	4×60 MW	
Gezhen Hydropower Station	戈枕水电站	19°10′47″N 108°57′58″E	Changhua	80	34	Operational	2×40 MW	
Niululing Hydropower Station	牛路岭水电站	19°00′26″N 110°11′45″E	Wanquan tributary	80	90.5	Operational	4×20 MW	
Songtao Hydropower Station	松涛水电站	19°19′59″N 109°40′45″E	Nandu	20	80.7	Operational	2×10 MW	

==== Pumped-storage ====
Station	Name in Chinese	Coordinates	Status	Capacity (MW)	Height difference (meters)	Operational units	Under construction units
Qiongzhong Pumped-storage Hydro Power Station	琼中抽水蓄能电站	19°12′31″N 109°42′28″E	Operational	600		3×200MW	

== See also ==
- List of power stations in China
