= Gåsøyane =

Islands in Svalbard

Coordinates: 60°15′N 4°58′E

Gåsøyane are two small islands off Bünsow Land at Spitsbergen, Svalbard. They are located at the split of Isfjorden into the two branches Billefjorden and Sassenfjorden, about two kilometers off the headland of Gåsodden. Gåsøyane were included in the Gåsøyane Bird Sanctuary in 1973.
