= Gezhen Dam =

- Location of Gezhen Dam Gezhen Dam (China)
- Country: China
- Location: Dongfang
- Coordinates: 19°10′47″N 108°57′58″E
- Status: Operational
- Construction began: 2007
- Opening date: 2009
- Owner: Huaneng Hainan Power Inc

Dam and spillways
- Type of dam: Gravity/Embankment
- Impounds: Changhua River
- Height: 34 m (112 ft)
- Length: 1,092 m (3,583 ft)
- Elevation at crest: 58.5 m (192 ft)
- Dam volume: 460,000 m^{3} (601,657 cu yd) (concrete gravity dam)
- Spillway type: 12 gates

Reservoir
- Total capacity: 146,000,000 m^{3} (118,364 acre⋅ft)
- Catchment area: 3,997 km^{2} (1,543 mi^{2})
- Surface area: 9.04 km^{2} (3 mi^{2})

Power Station
- Commission date: 2009
- Hydraulic head: 22.5 m (74 ft)
- Turbines: 2 x 40 MW Kaplan-type
- Installed capacity: 80 MW

The Gezhen Dam is a multi-purpose dam on the Changhua River in Hainan Province, China. It is located 34 km (21 mi) east of Dongfang. The dam serves mainly to provide run-of-the-river hydroelectric power and to supply water for irrigation. The dam's power plant has an installed capacity of 80 MW while it is designed to provide water for the irrigation of 8,667 ha (21,417 acres). Construction began in 2007, the reservoir began to fill in 2009 and the project was complete in December 2009.

== See also ==
- Daguangba Dam — located upstream
- List of major power stations in Hainan
- List of dams and reservoirs in China
