= Templet (Svalbard) =

Mountain in Svalbard, Norway

Coordinates: 78°25′02″N 16°43′06″E

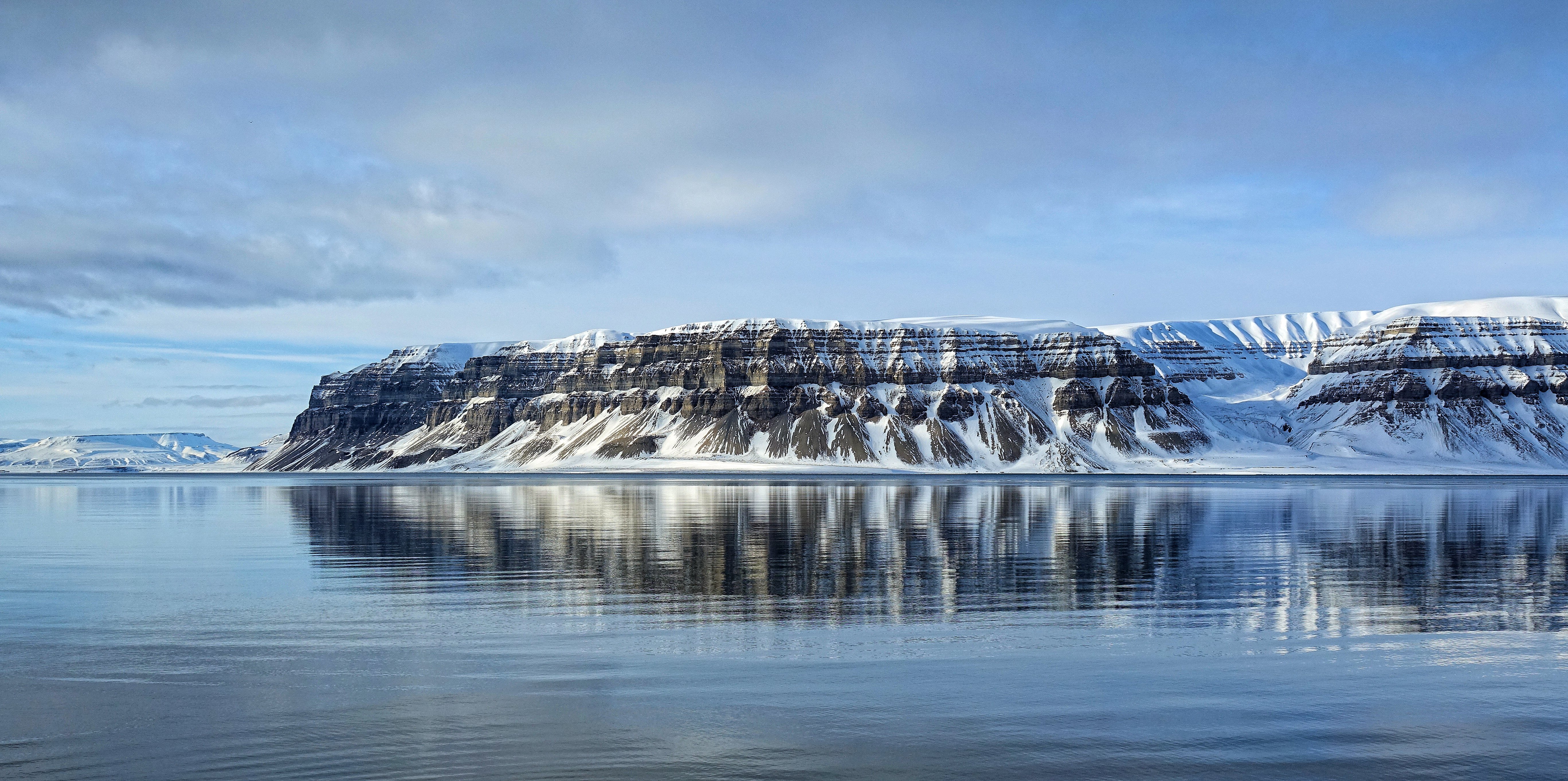
- Templet viewed from across Tempelfjorden

Highest point
- Elevation: 766 m (2,513 ft)

Geography
- Location: Bünsow Land at Spitsbergen, Svalbard, Norway

Templet is a mountain north of Sassenfjorden, at the south side of Bünsow Land at Spitsbergen, Svalbard. Its height is 766 metre. The name Templet stems from its resemblance to a ruined Gothic cathedral, consisting of eroded horizontal layers of shales, silicates and limestones.

The mountain lies within the Sassen – Bünsow Land National Park, and is regarded as a tourist attraction.
