= Gipsvika =

Bay in Svalbard, Norway

Coordinates: 78°25′54″N 16°30′54″E

Gipsvika is a bay in Bünsow Land at Spitsbergen, Svalbard. It is located at the mouth of Gipsdalen, at the northern side of Sassenfjorden. The bay has a width of about two nautical miles.

Gipsvika is included in the Sassen-Bünsow Land National Park. Relics from early mining industry at the site have now been defined as a cultural heritage.
