= Tunabreen =

Glacier in Svalbard, Norway

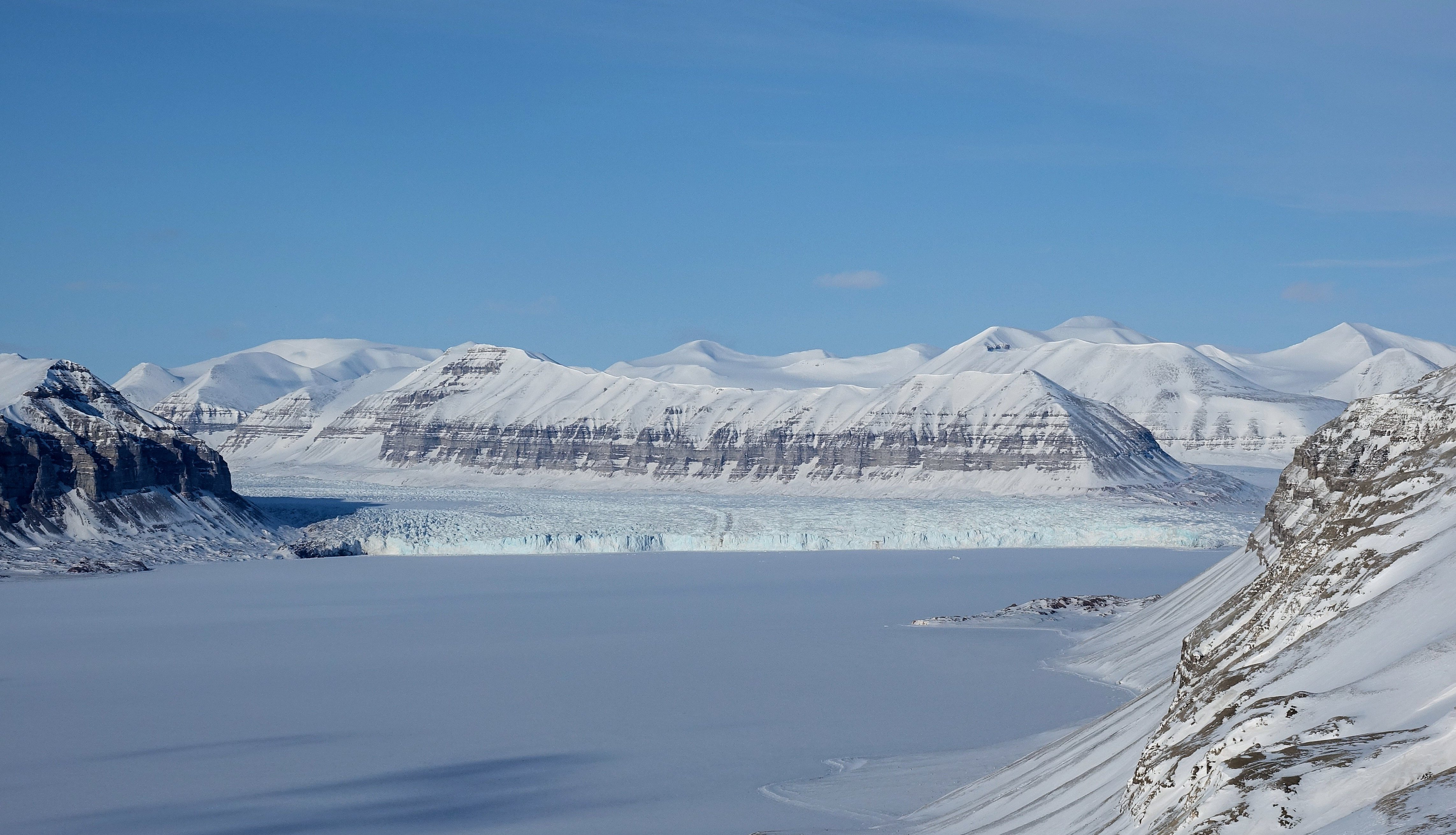
- Tunabreen seen from Fjordnibba, southwest of the glacier

- Location within Svalbard
- Type: Glacier stream
- Location: Sabine Land, Bünsow Land; Spitsbergen, Svalbard
- Coordinates: 78.4968°N 17.4321°E
- Length: 23 km (14 mi)

Tunabreen is a glacier stream at Spitsbergen, Svalbard. The glacier is about 23 kilometers long, and divides Sabine Land from Bünsow Land. It starts from Lomonosovfonna, flows southwards between the mountains of Langtunafjella and Ultunafjella, merges with Von Postbreen, and the combined glacier debouches into Tempelfjorden.
