= Gipsdalen =

Valley of Spitsbergen, Norway

Coordinates: 78°29′09″N 16°52′03″E

Gipsdalen is a valley in Bünsow Land at Spitsbergen, Svalbard. It has a length of about 22 kilometers. The river Gipsdalselva flows through the valley and debouches into Gipsvika in Sassenfjorden. At the western side of the valley are Norströmfjellet, Meakinsfjellet, Grahamkammen, Usherfjellet and Gipshuken.
