= Daguangba Dam =

- Location of Daguangba Dam Daguangba Dam (China)
- Official name: 广坝农场
- Country: China
- Location: Dongfang
- Coordinates: 19°01′10″N 108°58′46″E
- Status: Operational
- Construction began: 1990
- Opening date: 1995
- Construction cost: US$197.5 million
- Owner: Hainan Provincial Electric Power Company (HEPCO)

Dam and spillways
- Type of dam: Concrete gravity/Embankment
- Impounds: Changhua River
- Height: Concrete section: 57 m (187 ft); Embankment:44 m (144 ft)
- Length: Concrete section: 719 m (2,359 ft); Embankment:5,123 m (16,808 ft); Total:5,842 m (19,167 ft)
- Elevation at crest: Concrete section: 144 m (472 ft); Embankment:145 m (476 ft)
- Dam volume: Concrete section: 860,000 m^{3} (1,124,838 cu yd); Embankment: 7,800,000 m^{3} (10,202,015 cu yd)
- Spillway type: Controlled, 16 radial gates
- Spillway capacity: 35,564 m^{3}/s (1,255,931 cu ft/s)

Reservoir
- Total capacity: 1,710,000,000 m^{3} (1,386,320 acre⋅ft)
- Active capacity: 1,315,000,000 m^{3} (1,066,088 acre⋅ft)
- Catchment area: 3,498 km^{2} (1,351 mi^{2})
- Normal elevation: 140 m (459 ft)

Power Station
- Commission date: 1993–1995
- Turbines: 4 x 60 MW Francis-type
- Installed capacity: 240 MW

The Daguangba Dam is a multi-purpose dam on the Changhua River in Hainan Province, China. It is located 35 km (22 mi) east of Dongfang. As the primary component of the Daguangba Multipurpose Project, the dam was constructed between 1990 and 1995. It serves to provide water for both hydroelectric power generation and agriculture. It supports a 240 MW power station and supplies water for the irrigation of 12,700 ha (31,382 acres). It is also the largest dam and hydroelectric power station in Hainan.

== Background ==
Preliminary construction (roads, bridges, river diversion) on the project began in March 1990. On 29 December 1993, the first generator was commissioned, with the second and third in 1994. On 29 March 1995, the fourth and last generator was commissioned. In June 1995, the concrete portion of the dam was poured to its design height. In December of that year, the entire power station was placed into commercial operation. In November 1996, the reservoir was full. The project also includes the 16 km (10 mi) long Head Main Canal which connects to a designed network of 154 km (96 mi) of branch and lateral canals. Approximately 23,800 people were relocated because of either the reservoir or irrigation works. Of the project's US$197.5 million cost, US$67 million was funded by the World Bank.

== Design ==
The Daguangba Dam consists of a concrete gravity section flanked by two homogeneous earth-fill embankment dam sections. The gravity dam lies over the river and is 57 m (187 ft) high with a length of 719 m (2,359 ft). The embankments have a maximum height of 44 m (144 ft) and combined length of 5,123 m (16,808 ft). The total length of the entire dam is 5,842 m (19,167 ft), making it one of the longest in China. The volume of concrete (including roller-compacted concrete) in the gravity dam is 860,000 m^{3} (1,124,838 cu yd) while the embankments have a fill of 7,800,000 m^{3} (10,202,015 cu yd). It is the largest dam in Hainan Province. The reservoir withheld by the dam has a storage volume of 1,710,000,000 m^{3} (1,386,320 acre⋅ft). Of that volume, 1,315,000,000 m^{3} (1,066,088 acre⋅ft) is active (or "useful") volume. The spillway is located on the gravity section and is controlled by 16 radial gates. Its maximum discharge is 35,564 m^{3}/s (1,255,931 cu ft/s). The dam's power station is located on the right side of the gravity section and contains four 60 MW Francis turbine-generators for a total installed capacity of 240 MW. It is the largest hydroelectric power station in Hainan.

== See also ==
- Gezhen Dam – located downstream
- List of major power stations in Hainan
- List of dams and reservoirs in China
