= Von Postbreen =

Glacier in Svalbard, Norway

Coordinates: 78.4176°N 17.7151°E

Von Postbreen is a glacier stream in Sabine Land at Spitsbergen, Svalbard. The glacier is about fifteen kilometers long, and debouches into Tempelfjorden after merging with Tunabreen. It is named after Swedish geologist Hampus Adolf von Post.
