= Nansheng River =

- Native name: 南圣河 (Chinese); 通什河 (Chinese)

Location
- Country: China
- City: Wuzhishan City

Physical characteristics
- Mouth
  - coordinates: 18°52′07″N 109°23′09″E
- Length: 56.32 kilometers

The Nansheng River (Chinese: 南圣河), also known as Tongshi Water (通什水), Tongshi River (通什河), is a river in Wuzhishan City of Hainan Province. It is located in the western part of Hainan Island, and is a tributary of the upper Changhua River.

Nansheng River originates from Xianfang Ridge (贤芳岭) in the northern part of Baoting Li and Miao Autonomous County, flows westward through Nansheng Town (南圣镇) of Wuzhishan City, Tonggshi Town (formerly Chongshan Town), and turns northward to Maodao Township (毛道乡), where it flows into the Changhua River in Wanban Village (万板村), Panyang Town (番阳镇).

The river is 56.32 kilometers long, with a drop of 607 meters, and a watershed area of 660.1 square kilometers.
