= Usherfjellet =

Mountain in Svalbard, Norway

Highest point
- Coordinates: 78°29′02″N 16°38′50″E

Geography
- Location: Bünsow Land
- Country: Norway
- Region: Svalbard
- District: Spitsbergen

Usherfjellet is a mountain in Bünsow Land at Spitsbergen, Svalbard. It has a height of 683 m.a.s.l., and is located at the western side of Gipsdalen, near the mountain ridges of Grahamkammen and Skeltonfjellet. Usherfjellet is named after Scotsman Thomas Leslie Usher.

== See also ==
- Usherbreen
