= Ultunafjella =

Mountain ridge in Svalbard, Norway

Coordinates: 78.4862°N 17.3387°E

Ultunafjella is a mountain ridge in Bünsow Land at Spitsbergen, Svalbard. It has a length of about seven kilometers. At the western side of the ridge is the glacier Brucebreen, and at the eastern side is Tunabreen. The ridge is named after Ultuna, Sweden.
