= Gåsøyane Bird Sanctuary =

Protected area in Svalbard, Norway

Coordinates: 78°27′11″N 16°12′30″E

Designations

Ramsar Wetland
- Official name: Gåsøyane
- Designated: 24 July 1985
- Reference no.: 317

Gåsøyane Bird Sanctuary (Norwegian: Gåsøyane fuglereservat) is a bird reserve at Svalbard, Norway, established in 1973. It includes Gåsøyane in Bünsow Land. The protected area covers a total area of around 2,400,000 square metres.
