= Sanjia =

Sanjia could refer to the following places in China:

Towns

- Sanjia, Yangchun (三甲镇), Guangdong
- Sanjia, Dongfang, Hainan (三家镇)
- Sanjia, Gaoping (三甲镇), Shanxi
- Sanjia, Suining (三家镇), in Anju District, Suining, Sichuan

Townships

- Sanjia (三家乡) in Hebei's Chengde County
- Sanjia (三佳乡) in Shanxi's Jiexiu Prefecture

Subdistrict

- Sanjia, Leiyang (三架街道), a subdistrict of Leiyang City, Hunan.
