= Gan'en River =

Location
- Country: Dongfang City, China

Physical characteristics
- Mouth
  - coordinates: 18°52′00″N 108°37′56″E
- Length: 54.5 kilometres

Gan'en River
- Chinese: 感恩河
- Literal meaning: Thanksgiving River
- Hanyu Pinyin: Gǎn'ēn hé

The Gan'en River or Gan'en He or Thanksgiving River (Chinese: 感恩河), also known as Yulong River (雨龙江), Chengdong River (城东河), Thanksgiving Water (感恩水), is a river in Hainan Province of People's Republic of China, located in the southern part of Dongfang City.

Thanksgiving River is the fifth largest river in Hainan Province, it originates from the Mengtong Ridge (蒙瞳岭) at the junction of Dongfang City and Ledongli Autonomous County, meanders north to Nanlong Village (南龙村) of Jiangbian Township (江边乡), turns west to flow through Tuoxing Reservoir, and merges into the South China Sea at Gancheng Township (感城镇).

The river is 54.5 kilometers long, with a watershed area of 381 square kilometers. The river has an average annual runoff of 224 million cubic meters.
