= Gåsodden =

Headland in Spitsbergen, Svalbard

Coordinates: 78.4557°N 16.3055°E

Gåsodden (The Goose Point) is a headland in Bünsow Land at Spitsbergen, Svalbard. It is the southwestern point of Bünsow Land. At the southern side of Gåsodden is Sassenfjorden, and at the northwestern side is Billefjorden.
