= Langtunafjella =

Coordinates: 78.5052°N 17.5712°E

Langtunafjella is a mountain ridge in Sabine Land at Spitsbergen, Svalbard. It has a length of about twelve kilometers. The highest peak is 933 m.a.s.l. At the western side of the ridge is the glacier Tunabreen, and at the eastern side is Bogebreen.
