= Dongfang Power Station =

Coordinates: 19°2′57″N 108°38′10″E

Dongfang Power Station 东方电厂
- Interactive map of Dongfang Power Station 东方电厂
- Country: China
- Location: Dongfang City, Hainan Province
- Purpose: Power
- Construction began: 28 September 2007
- Construction cost: ¥5.85 billion

The Dongfang Power Station (Chinese: 东方电厂), also spelled Dongfang Power Plant, is a generating plant project in Hainan, located in Xiaozhou Industrial Development Zone, Dongfang City. It is the first supercritical coal-fired power plant in the history of Hainan Province.

== History ==
The construction of Dongfang Power Station started on 28 September 2007, and the first phase of the project was put into operation on 28 December 2009, with a total investment of 3.25 billion yuan.

At the end of 2010, the second phase of Dongfang Power Station was officially started, approved by the National Development and Reform Commission, with a total investment of 2.6 billion yuan.

On May 6, 2012, the No. 3 unit of Dongfang Power Plant Phase II 2×350 MW coal-fired unit project completed 168 hours of trial operation and was directly transferred to operation.
