= Niululing Dam =

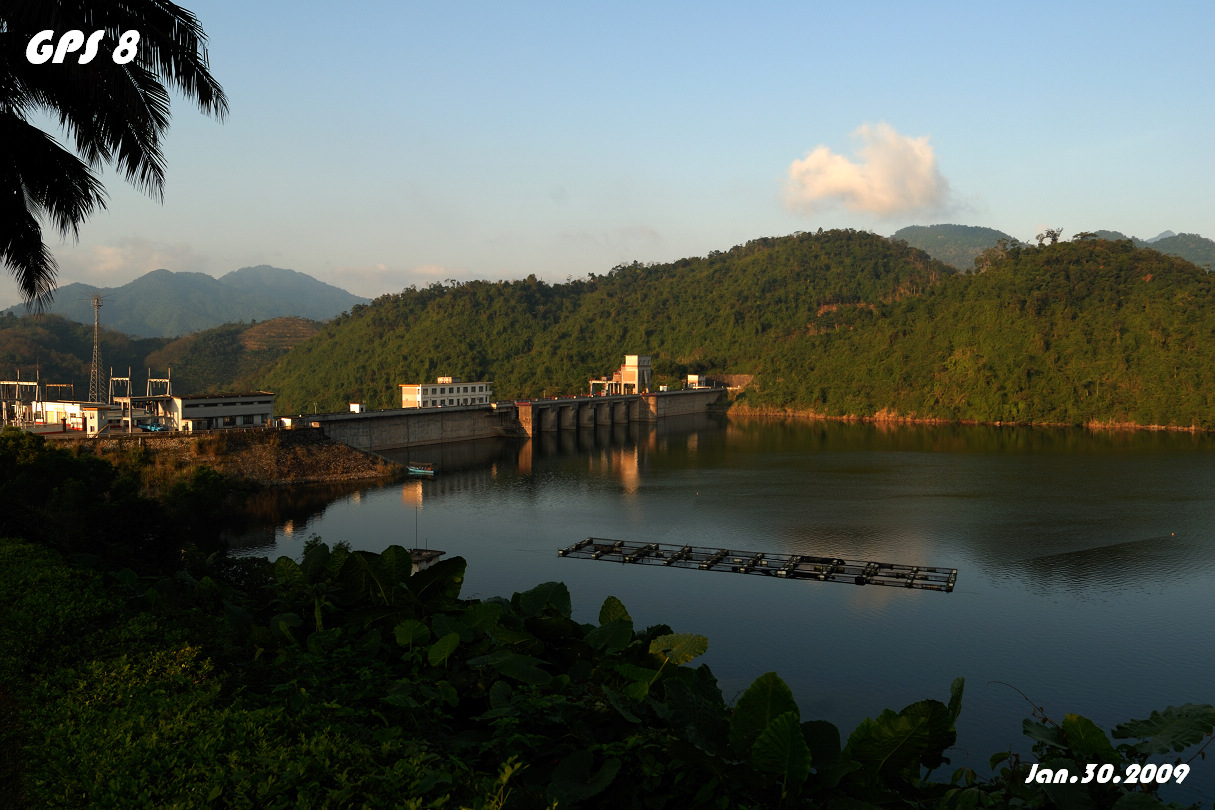

- Location of Niululing Dam Niululing Dam (China)
- Official name: 牛路岭水电站
- Country: China
- Location: Qionghai
- Coordinates: 19°00′26″N 110°11′45″E
- Status: Operational
- Construction began: 1976
- Opening date: 1982
- Owner: Hainan Provincial Electric Power Company (HEPCO)

Dam and spillways
- Type of dam: Gravity
- Impounds: Wanquan River tributary
- Height: 90.5 m (297 ft)
- Length: 341 m (1,119 ft)
- Elevation at crest: 115.5 m (379 ft)
- Spillway type: 7 gates

Reservoir
- Total capacity: 778,000,000 m^{3} (630,735 acre⋅ft)
- Catchment area: 1,236 km^{2} (477 mi^{2})
- Normal elevation: 105 m (344 ft)

Power Station
- Commission date: 1979-1982
- Hydraulic head: 61 m (200 ft) (design)
- Turbines: 4 x 20 MW Francis-type
- Installed capacity: 80 MW
- Annual generation: 281 million kWh

The Niululing Dam is a gravity dam on a tributary of the Wanquan River in Hainan Province, China. It is located 39 km (24 mi) southwest of Qionghai. The dam serves to produce hydroelectricity and protect against floods. Plans for the dam began in 1965 and construction began in 1976. All four generators were commissioned between 1979 and 1982. Its power station has an 80 MW installed capacity.

== See also ==
- List of major power stations in Hainan
- List of dams and reservoirs in China
