= Basuo =

Basuo 八所镇
- Town
- Location of the town in Hainan
- Coordinates (Basuo government): 19°05′31″N 108°40′16″E
- Country: People's Republic of China
- Province: Hainan
- County-level city: Dongfang
- Elevation: 11 m (36 ft)
- Time zone: UTC+8 (China Standard)
- Postal code: 572600
- Area code: 0898

Basuo
- Simplified Chinese: 八所
- Literal meaning: Eight Place
Transcriptions
Standard Mandarin
- Hanyu Pinyin: Bāsuǒ

Basuo is a town on the west coast of Hainan Province, China. It is the administrative center of the county-level city of Dongfang; in other words, Basuo is Dongfang's main urban area, and Basuo's location is usually shown on less-detailed maps by a circle labeled "Dongfang".

== History ==
Basuo's port has been the outlet for the Shilu iron-ore mine since the early 1940s, when it was first connected to Shilu by a narrow-gauge railway. The railway since been converted to the standard gauge, and is a part of the Hainan Western Ring Railway.

Basuo was one of the landing zones of communist forces during the Landing Operation on Hainan Island at the end of the Chinese Civil War in 1950.

== Basuo Port ==
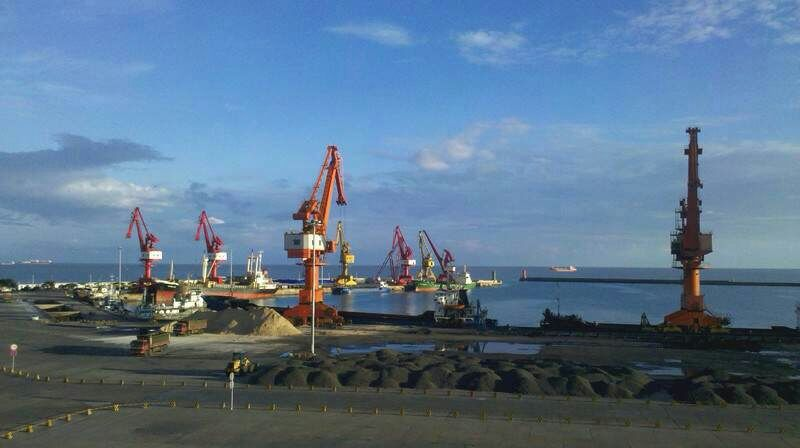
Basuo Port

A fishing and commercial port, Basuo operates under the UN/LOCODE CNBAS.
