= SV Noorderlicht =

Schooner launched in 1910

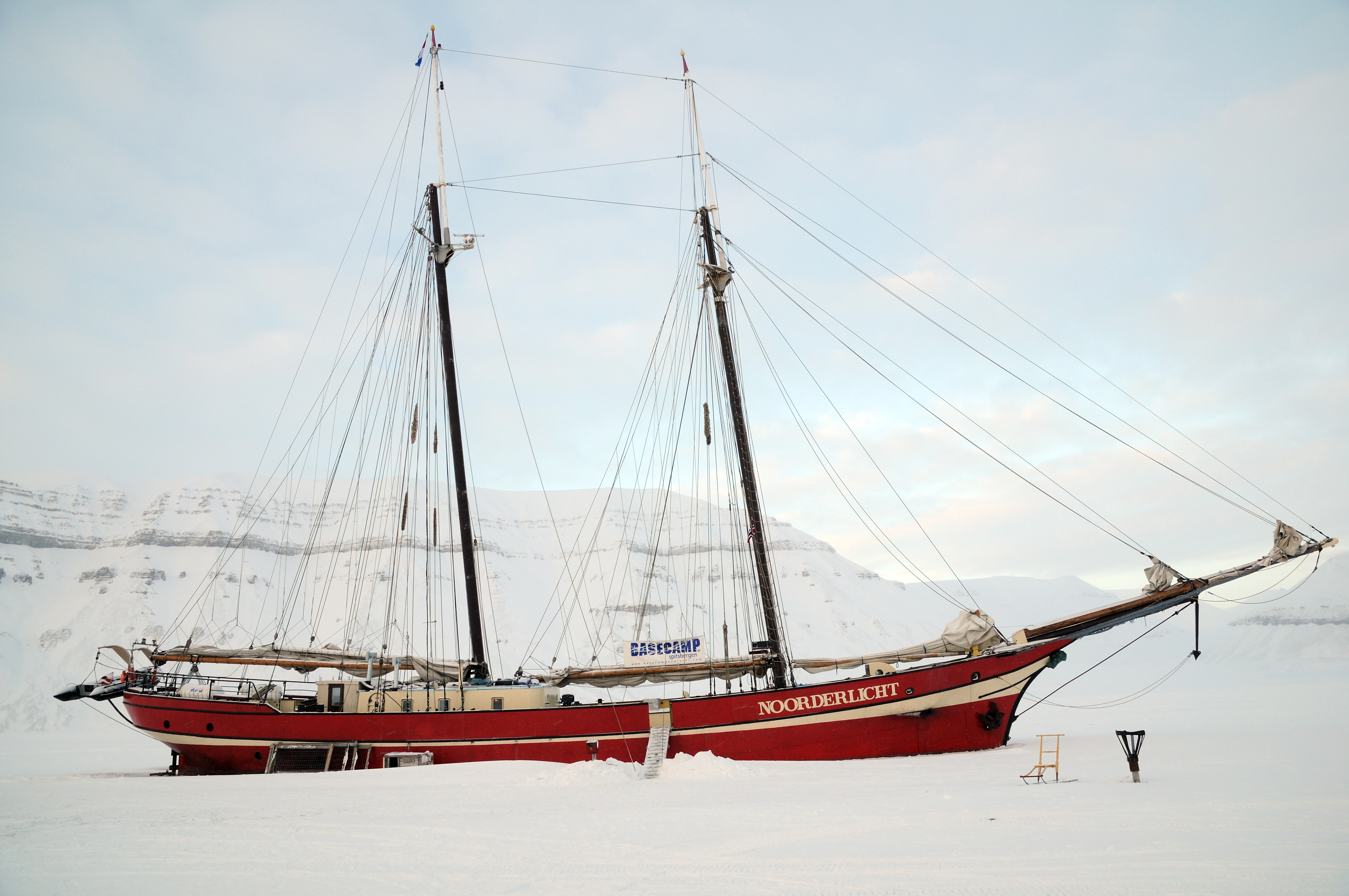
- Noorderlicht during the winter season, intentionally frozen in ice as an expedition base camp

History
- Name: Kalkgrund II (1910–1925); Flensburg (1925–1992); Noorderlicht (1992–present)
- Owner: Fa. Holm & Moltzen (1963–1966); Möltenorter Seglerkameradschaft (1967–1988); Ted van Broeckhuysen and Gert Ritzema (Ribro Boot BV), Muiden (1992–2016); Floris de Waard and Mariëlle van Twillert (Ocean going BV), Kampen (2017–2021); Swan Expeditions, Akkrum (2021-present)
- Operator: Imperial German Navy (1910–1919); Seezeichenbehörde (1920–1924); Wasserbauamt Kiel (1925–1938); Kriegsmarine (1939–1945); Oceanwide Expeditions (1992–2021); Swan Expeditions (2021-present)
- Builder: Flensburger Schiffbau-Gesellschaft
- Yard number: 300
- Launched: April 1910
- In service: 2 July 1910
- Out of service: October 1963
- Identification: IMO number: 8650813; MMSI number: 244091000; Call sign: PGJG
- Status: Light vessel (1910–1962); Floating hostel (1963–1966); Club house (1967–1986); Sail cruise vessel (1992–present)

General characteristics
- Class & type: Schooner
- Tonnage: 140 GRT, 60 NRT, 250 DWT (155 GRT as built)
- Displacement: 255 t (251 long tons) (as built)
- Length: 46.20 m (151 ft 7 in) (36 m (118 ft 1 in) as built)
- Beam: 6.50 m (21 ft 4 in)
- Draught: 3 m (9 ft 10 in)
- Depth: 3.20 metres (10 ft 6 in)
- Installed power: 360 horsepower (270 kW)
- Propulsion: Sails and diesel engine
- Sail plan: Schooner
- Speed: 7 knots (13 km/h)
- Capacity: 20 passengers + crew
- Armament: 2 cm (0.79 in) anti-aircraft gun (1940)

SV Noorderlicht (Northern Light or Aurora Borealis) is a two-masted schooner built in 1910 as a light sailing vessel for the Imperial German Navy. Since the 1990s, she has served as one of the expedition cruise vessels for Oceanwide Expeditions, and from 2021 she is owned by Swan Expeditions, sailing to some of the most remote locations in the Arctic, particularly the archipelago of Svalbard.

== History ==
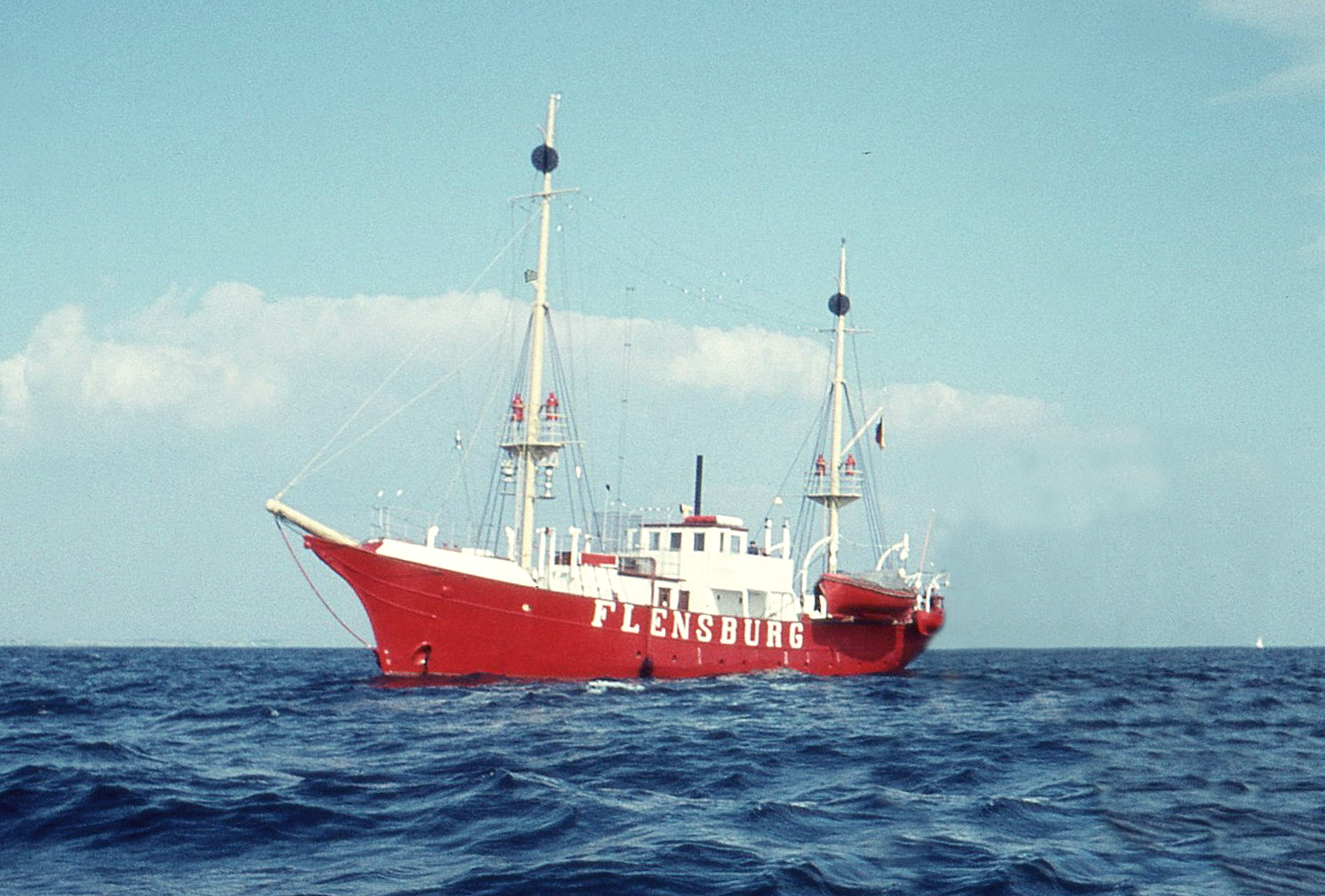
Flensburg underway in 1961

Noorderlicht is a steel two-masted schooner built in 1910 in Flensburg, Germany, by Flensburger Schiffbau-Gesellschaft for the Imperial German Navy. The ship was originally named Fs Kalkgrund II, rigged as a three-masted schooner, and used as a light vessel (Feuerschiff) on the Kalkgrund station off the Flensburg Firth. It also functioned as a weather ship and pilot station.

The middle mast was taken out to improve stability during World War II, when the vessel was in the service of Nazi Germany's Kriegsmarine and named Flensburg. An anti-aircraft gun was also fitted to it. After the war, the vessel continued to serve as a light ship until it was retired in 1963.

Between 1963 and 1992, the vessel had a number of owners. It was used as a workers' hostel for a time, and from 1967 to 1986, as a clubhouse for the sailing association Möltenorter Seglerkameradschaft at Heikendorf. Afterward, it was sold to the Netherlands. In 1991, the vessel was found in Leeuwarden, Netherlands, Ted van Broeckhuysen and Gert Ritzema. They had the ship re-rigged, restored, and equipped with an auxiliary engine. After renaming it Noorderlicht, the ship entered service as an expedition cruise vessel. Since 2011, it first has been operated in Svalbard by Oceanwide Expeditions, based in Vlissingen, Netherlands. From 2021 she is owned by Swan Expeditions, who continued sailing the vessel in Arctic sailing areas.

On 31 May 2016, Noorderlicht ran aground on the north coast of Vlieland. The 28 children on board were taken off by a KNRM rescue boat. On 18 September, she ran aground again at Trygghamna, Norway. She was re-floated with assistance from a tug deployed by the Norwegian tug Polarsyssel.

On 23 March 2023, she ran aground off Rugholmen, Norway. Twenty-four of the 26 people on board were rescued. Her captain and mate remained aboard awaiting the assistance of a tug.

== Cruise vessel ==
Noorderlicht's schedule is based at Longyearbyen, Svalbard. It runs voyages in the archipelago, the Lofoten islands, and to mainland locations within the polar regions. Ten cabins provide accommodation for up to 20 passengers, and two rigid-hulled inflatable boats are carried to enable close-up viewing of wildlife and landscapes in otherwise inaccessible areas.

Between 2002 and 2015, Noorderlicht was intentionally ice-locked at Tempelfjorden, Svalbard, during the winter months to provide base-camp accommodation for Arctic journeys.
