= MV Zhe Hai 168 =

Chinese bulk carrier

History

China
- Name: Zhe Hai 168
- Operator: Zhejiang Shipping Group
- Port of registry: Shanghai
- Completed: 2011
- Identification: IMO number: 9492373; MMSI number: 413376320; Call sign: BIAH8
- Status: Grounded off Eastern Samar on 18 April 2023, possibility for refloating

General characteristics
- Class & type: Supramax bulk carrier
- Tonnage: 33,147 GT; 57,033 DWT
- Length: 190 m (623 ft 4 in)
- Beam: 32.3 m (106 ft 0 in)
- Draft: 11.3 m (37 ft 1 in)
- Crew: 20

MV Zhe Hai 168 (浙海168) is a Chinese Supramax bulk carrier operated by Zhejiang Shipping Group that ran aground in the Philippines in April 2016 and April 2023. It has an overall length of 190 m (620 ft), a width of 32.3 m (106 ft), and a draft of 11.3 m (37 ft). It has a gross tonnage of 33,147 GT and a carrying capacity of 57,033 DWT.

== History ==
Zhe Hai 168 was built in 2011. On 20 April 2016, the ship ran aground north of Palawan Island in the Philippines while transiting to a nickel corporation terminal in Quezon. It remained stuck where it ran aground until at least 25 April.

On 18 April 2023, the ship was transiting off the southeast coast of Samar Island in the Philippines while carrying a cargo of 55,000 tons of nickel ore towards Caofeidian, China. While in route, Zhe Hai 168 was caught in stormy weather and attempted to find shelter. However, the ship ran aground on a shallow reef at 2000 local time and became stuck. Its AIS went offline on 20 April. Early on the morning of 23 April, the ship was approached by Malasuigi 1, a tugboat, and its AIS connection was reestablished. All twenty Chinese crew aboard were reported to be unharmed and safe.

Local authorities were concerned about environmental damage following the vessel's grounding. While no breaches in the hull or oil spills were recorded, damage to the reef and surrounding marine area was still possible, and the Philippine Coast Guard quickly began an investigation into the incident. Salvage operations began by 26 April, with the ultimate hope of refloating the vessel. Cargo began to be transferred to MV Zhe Hai 169, the grounded vessel's sister ship, while a Singapore-based salvage company made its way to the shipwreck. Cargo transfer was projected to be completed by 10 May.
