= MV Modern Express =

Scrapped vehicles carrier

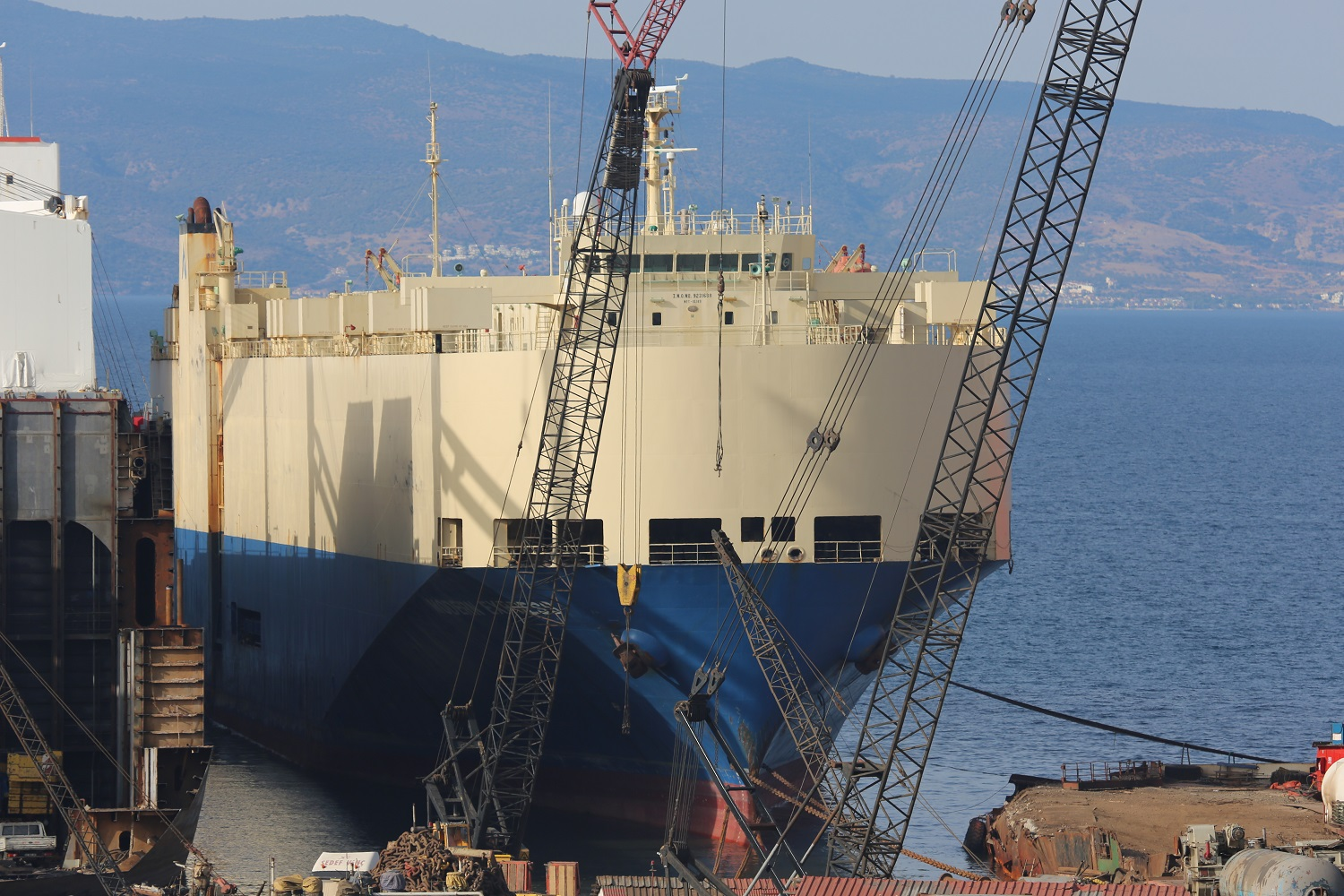
Modern Express, after arrival in Aliağa, after its dramatic salvage.

The MV Modern Express was a Panama-registered car carrier that developed a list in the Bay of Biscay in January 2016, while carrying earthmoving equipment, trucks and logs. It was a Pure Car Truck Carrier (PCTC) built in 2001 in South Korea, managed by Cido Shipping.

== January 2016 shipwreck ==
On 26 January 2016, Modern Express was en route to Le Havre, France carrying 3,600 tons of earthmoving equipment, and logs. Heavy winds caused it to develop a 40° list while sailing on the Bay of Biscay, 150 nautical miles off the coast of Spain. Salvamento Maritimo responded to its "mayday" call. By the afternoon of January 26, all 22 crew were carried to safety by two Spanish helicopters. An immediate rescue operation was needed because the ship, now adrift, was heading towards the French coast, carried by the strong current and wind. There was great concern that it could run aground and cause an environmental disaster.

When weather improved on 1 February 2016, a second attempt by SMIT Salvage, a Dutch company, successfully attached a tow line. The ship was towed to Bilbao, Spain where it was brought upright, over three weeks, using its ballast tanks.

Maritime Executive, the ship's management, reported Modern Express's arrival in the shipbreaking port of Aliağa, Turkey, apparently confirming it would be scrapped rather than repaired.
