= Hainan Southwest Power Station =

Hainan Southwest Power Station 海南西南部电厂
- Location: Ledong Li Autonomous County, Hainan Province
- Purpose: Power
- Construction began: June 2014
- Construction cost: ¥3.784 billion

Hainan Southwest Power Station (Chinese: 海南西南部电厂), also known as Hainan Southwest Power Plant, is a Chinese thermal power plant located in Foluo Town (佛罗镇) on the west coast of Ledong Li Autonomous County, Hainan Province, with a total investment of 3.784 billion yuan.

== History ==
Hainan Southwest Power Station was approved by the National Development and Reform Commission in May 2014, and its construction started on June 30, 2014.

In July 2015, the generating station started trial operation. The No. 2 unit of the Southwest Power Plant was officially put into operation on October 16, marking the official launch of all units of the power plant into operation.
