= Haikou Power Station =

Haikou Power Station 海口电厂
- Interactive map of Haikou Power Station 海口电厂
- Country: China
- Location: Chengmai, Hainan
- Construction began: 1986
- Construction cost: ¥ 2.641 billion

The Haikou Power Station (Chinese: 海口电厂), also spelled Haikou Power Plant, is a coal-fired power plant in Hainan Province, located in Macunwan (马村湾), Laocheng Development Zone (老城开发区), Chengmai County. The plant has a total installed capacity of 1.21 million kilowatts, which is the first power plant in Hainan Province with an installed capacity of over one million kilowatts.

== History ==
The construction of Haikou Power Station started in 1986, with a total dynamic investment of 2.641 billion yuan.
