= Wenchang Natural Gas Power Station =

Wenchang Natural Gas Power Station 文昌燃气电厂
- Country: China
- Location: Wenchang, Hainan
- Purpose: Power
- Construction cost: ¥ 2.4 billion

The Wenchang Natural Gas Power Station (Chinese: 文昌燃气电厂), also known as Wenchang Gas-Fired Power Plant, is a natural gas peaking power plant in Hainan Province, located in Wenchang, adjacent to the Wenchang Spacecraft Launch Site. It is the first large-scale natural gas peaker plant on Hainan Island, with a total investment of 2.4 billion yuan.

== History ==
On March 12, 2020, the first unit of Wenchang Natural Gas Power Station completed a 168-hour trial operation and was officially put into operation.

On June 24, the generating station was fully put into operation for power generation. It is one of the key projects in the energy and power plan of Hainan Province during the 13th Five-Year Plan period.

Wenchang Natural Gas Power Station is designed to produce 2.276 billion kWh of electricity annually.
