= Sanjia, Hainan =

Sanjia 三家镇
- Town
- Location in Hainan
- Coordinates: 19°14′42″N 108°45′41″E
- Country: China
- Province: Hainan
- County-level city: Dongfang
- Elevation: 15 m (49 ft)
- Time zone: UTC+8 (China Standard)
- Area code: 0898

Sanjia (Chinese: 三家; pinyin: Sānjiǎ) is a town in the west of the island of Hainan, People's Republic of China. It is under the administration of the county-level city of Dongfang.
