= Tempelfjorden =

Fjord in Svalbard, Norway

Coordinates: 78°22′30″N 16°46′34″E

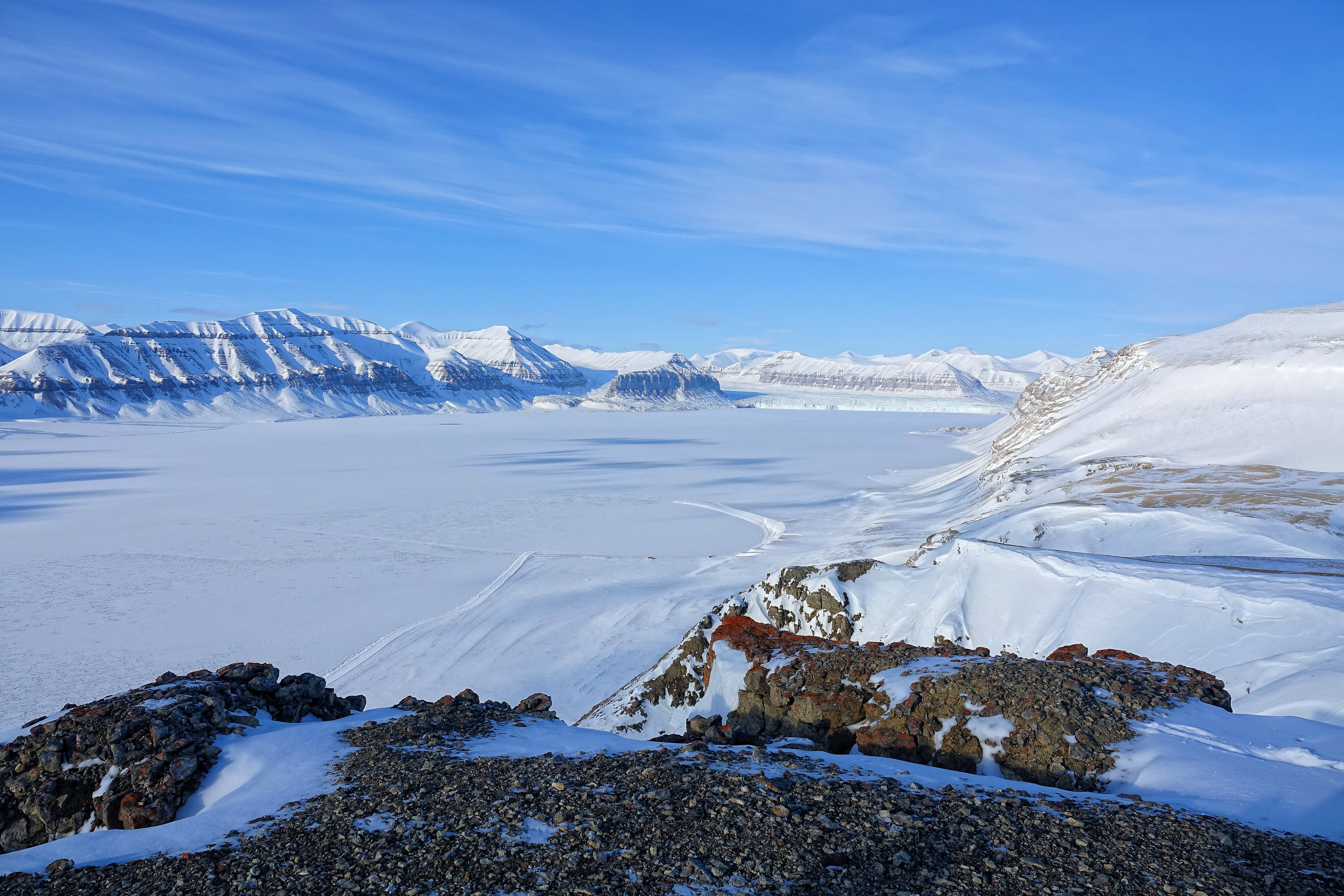
The northern part of Tempelfjorden seen from Fjordnibba

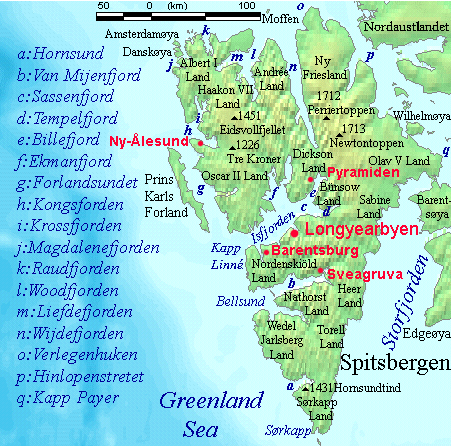
Tempelfjorden is located at the inner end of Sassenfjorden (in Isfjorden).

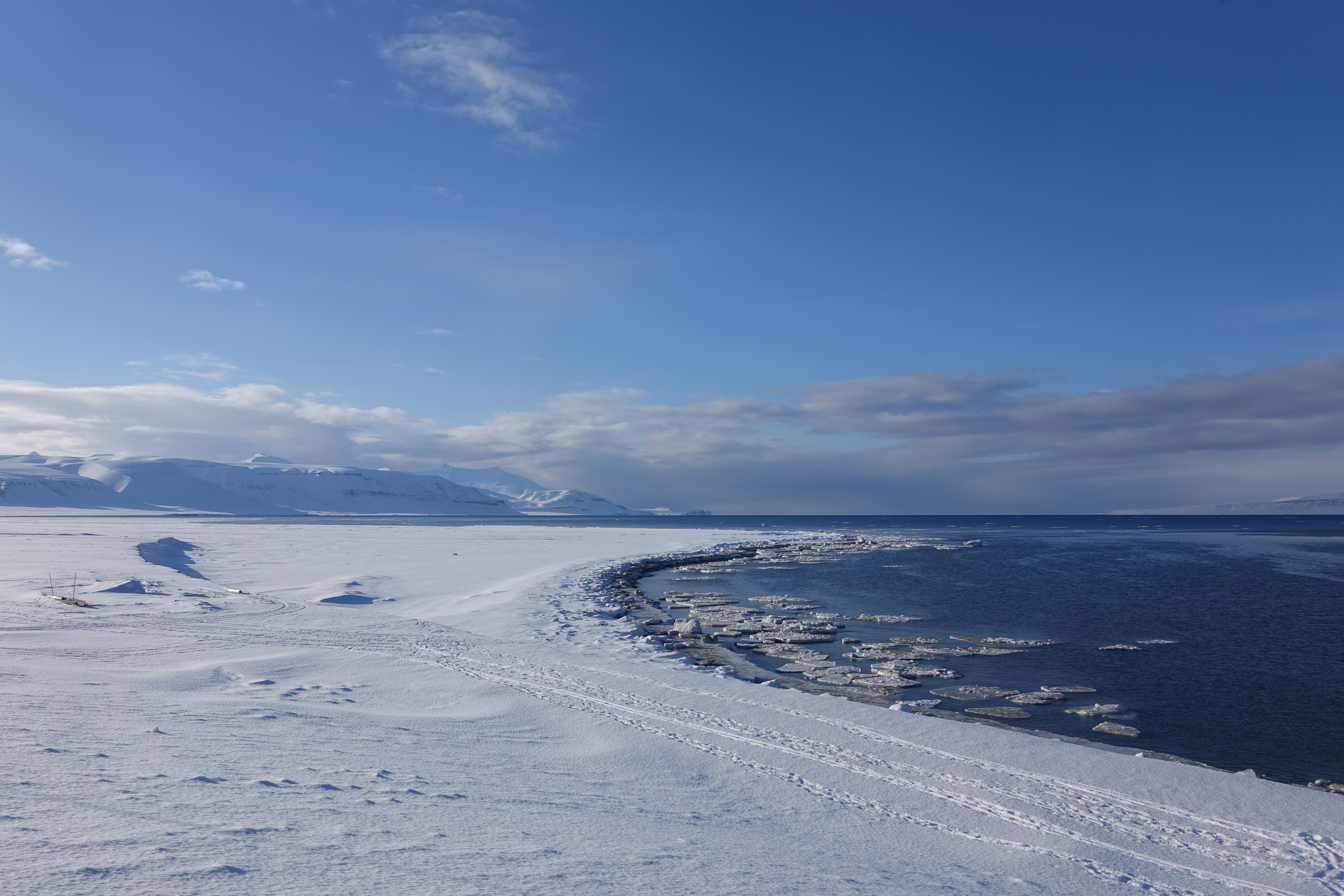
The seashore in Tempelfjorden where it meets Sassenfjorden

Tempelfjorden is a fjord branch at the inner end of Sassenfjorden, a part of Isfjorden at Spitsbergen, Svalbard. It is located between Sabine Land and Bünsow Land.

The fjord is named after the mountain Templet, which resembles a temple.

Between 2002 and 2015, the sailing vessel Noorderlicht was intentionally frozen into Tempelfjorden every winter.
