= Changhua River =

- Native name: 昌化江 (Chinese)

Location
- Country: Hainan Island, China

Physical characteristics
- Mouth
  - coordinates: 19°18′58″N 108°39′30″E
- Length: 232 kilometers

The Changhua River (Chinese: 昌化江), also known as Changhua Jiang, Chang River (昌江), is a river located in Hainan Province of the People's Republic of China. and is the second longest river in Hainan.

Changhua River originates from Kongshi Ridge (空示岭), Qiongzhong Li and Miao Autonomous County, and runs through the central and western parts of the island, passing through Qiongzhong, Baoting, Ledong, Dongfang and other cities and counties until it enters the sea at the Changhua Port (昌化港), with a total length of 232 kilometers and a watershed area of 5070 square kilometers.
