= Sassenfjorden =

Fjord in Svalbard, Norway

Coordinates: 78°25′15″N 15°55′09″E

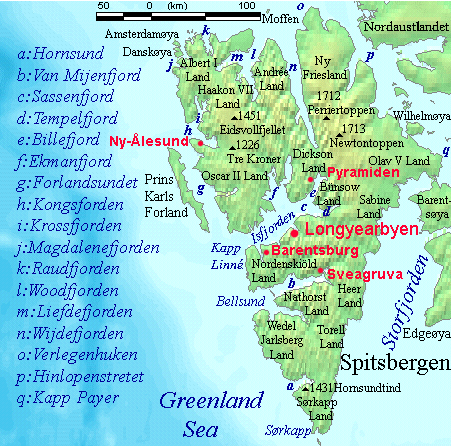
Sassenfjorden is part of Isfjorden.

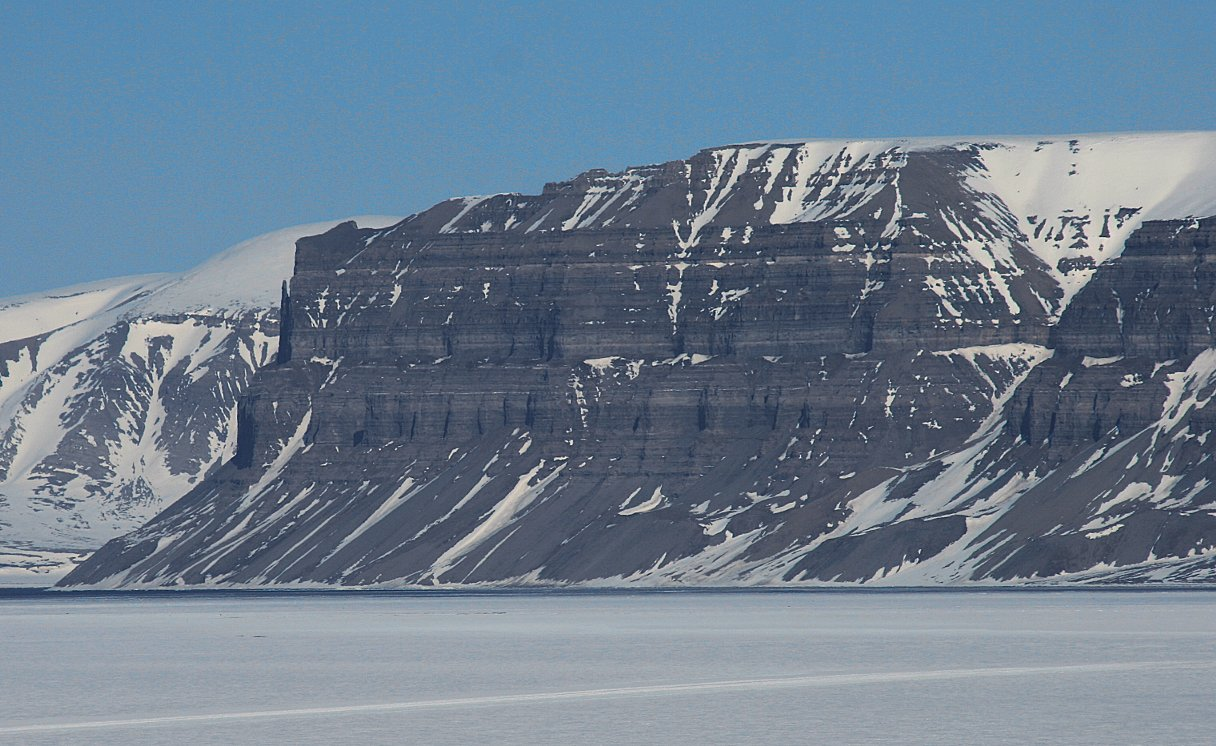
Sassenfjorden

Sassenfjorden is a part of Isfjorden at Spitsbergen, Svalbard, in between Bünsow Land and Nordenskiöld Land. The inner branch of Sassenfjorden is named Tempelfjorden.

Sassenfjorden is a continuation of the valley of Sassendalen.
