= Dongfang, Hainan =

Dongfang 东方市
- County-level & Sub-prefectural city
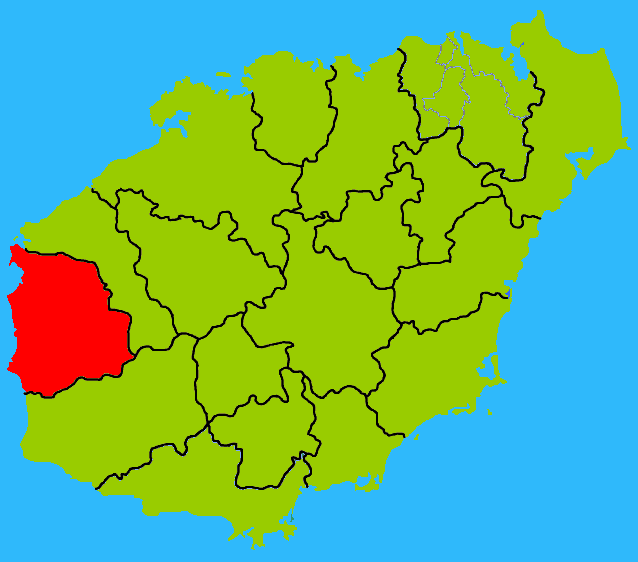
- Map showing entire Qionghai area within Hainan province
- Coordinates: 19°06′N 108°39′E
- Country: People's Republic of China
- Province: Hainan
- Township-level divisions: 8 towns 2 townships
- Municipal seat: Basuo

Area
  - Total: 2,256 km^{2} (871 sq mi)
- Elevation: 11 m (36 ft)

Population
  - Total: 435,000
  - Density: 193/km^{2} (499/sq mi)
- Time zone: UTC+8 (China Standard)
- Postal code: 572600
- Area code: 0898
- Licence plates: 琼D
- Website: dongfang.hainan.gov.cn

Dongfang (simplified Chinese: 东方; traditional Chinese: 東方; pinyin: Dōngfāng; lit. 'the East') is one of the five county-level cities of Hainan province, China. Although called a "city", Dongfang refers to a large land area in Hainan - an area which was once a county. Within this area is the main city, Dongfang City. It is located on the western coast of Hainan Island facing Vietnam across the Gulf of Tonkin, and in 2004 had a population of 435,000.

As all county-level units, Dongfang is administratively divided into township-level units (see the list). The main urban area of Dongfang (i.e., what used to be called "the county seat", when Dongfang was a county) is the town of Basuo.

The former county of Ganen (postal: Kumyan, Kanem or Kamyan) is now part of the city.

== Geography and climate ==
Dongfang has a tropical wet and dry climate (Köppen Aw). Monsoonal influences are strong, and the two seasons are the wet season and the dry season (November to April), when very little rainfall occurs. Rainfall is heaviest and most frequent from August to October, when typhoons may strike, and averages an annual total of 1,042.1 mm (41.0 in), far lower than much of the island. January through March features the highest relative humidity levels of the year, while May through August is very sunny, consistently averaging above 60% of possible sunshine. With monthly percent possible sunshine ranging from 50% in February to 67% in May, the city receives 2,574.3 hours of sunshine annually, a level not seen in the southern half of China outside of Tibet. The average low temperature remains above 26.0 °C (78.8 °F) from May to August, and the region has large tracts of virgin forest, gradually transitioning from desert steppe on the western coast to tropical seasonal forest in the eastern mountains.

Climate data for Dongfang, elevation 8 m (26 ft), (1991–2020 normals, extremes 1952–present)
Month	Jan	Feb	Mar	Apr	May	Jun	Jul	Aug	Sep	Oct	Nov	Dec	Year
Record high °C (°F)	33.2 (91.8)	35.1 (95.2)	37.3 (99.1)	38.9 (102.0)	38.7 (101.7)	38.1 (100.6)	37.9 (100.2)	36.5 (97.7)	35.3 (95.5)	35.0 (95.0)	33.8 (92.8)	32.3 (90.1)	38.9 (102.0)
Mean daily maximum °C (°F)	23.5 (74.3)	24.2 (75.6)	26.8 (80.2)	30.1 (86.2)	32.2 (90.0)	32.6 (90.7)	32.1 (89.8)	31.9 (89.4)	31.3 (88.3)	30.2 (86.4)	27.9 (82.2)	24.7 (76.5)	29.0 (84.1)
Daily mean °C (°F)	19.5 (67.1)	20.5 (68.9)	23.2 (73.8)	26.7 (80.1)	29.1 (84.4)	30.0 (86.0)	29.5 (85.1)	29.0 (84.2)	28.0 (82.4)	26.4 (79.5)	23.9 (75.0)	20.7 (69.3)	25.5 (78.0)
Mean daily minimum °C (°F)	16.7 (62.1)	17.8 (64.0)	20.5 (68.9)	23.9 (75.0)	26.4 (79.5)	27.7 (81.9)	27.1 (80.8)	26.4 (79.5)	25.3 (77.5)	23.6 (74.5)	21.1 (70.0)	18.0 (64.4)	22.9 (73.2)
Record low °C (°F)	1.4 (34.5)	6.7 (44.1)	7.6 (45.7)	11.5 (52.7)	18.2 (64.8)	20.2 (68.4)	20.4 (68.7)	20.4 (68.7)	17.7 (63.9)	9.3 (48.7)	6.6 (43.9)	4.8 (40.6)	1.4 (34.5)
Average precipitation mm (inches)	8.1 (0.32)	10.2 (0.40)	20.1 (0.79)	30.3 (1.19)	76.6 (3.02)	124.9 (4.92)	188.0 (7.40)	244.2 (9.61)	179.1 (7.05)	109.5 (4.31)	33.9 (1.33)	17.2 (0.68)	1,042.1 (41.02)
Average precipitation days (≥ 0.1 mm)	3.3	3.7	4.5	4.1	6.0	6.2	8.9	11.5	12.8	9.7	3.8	3.2	77.7
Average relative humidity (%)	80	81	80	77	74	74	76	79	81	78	77	77	78
Mean monthly sunshine hours	175.2	163.7	185.8	223.7	269.4	254.2	250.5	234.9	210.1	222.1	207.2	177.5	2,574.3
Percentage possible sunshine	51	50	50	59	67	64	62	60	58	62	62	52	58
Source: China Meteorological Administrationextremes

== Administrative divisions ==
Dongfang administers eight towns and two townships:

Towns:

- Basuo (八所镇)
- Donghe (东河镇)
- Datian (大田镇)
- Gancheng (感城镇)
- Banqiao (板桥镇)
- Sanjia (三家镇)
- Sigeng (四更镇)
- Xinlong (新龙镇)

Townships:

- Tian'an Township (天安乡)
- Jiangbian Township (江边乡)
