= Bünsow Land =

Coordinates: 78°32′10″N 16°59′55″E

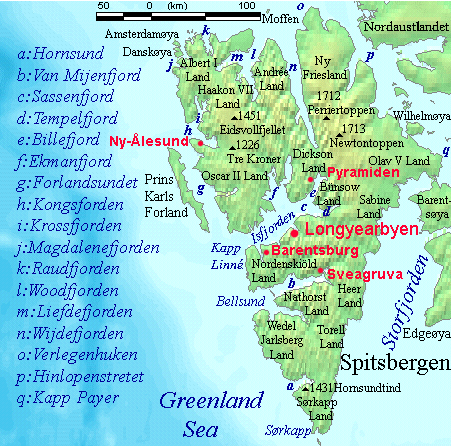
Bünsow Land is located at the inner end of Isfjorden.

Bünsow Land is a land area at the inner end of Isfjorden at Spitsbergen, Svalbard. It forms a peninsula between Billefjorden and Sassenfjorden and Tempelfjorden. Bünsow Land is named after Friedrich Christian Ernestus Bünsow.

Bünsow Land is included in the Sassen – Bünsow Land National Park.
