= List of Major National Historical and Cultural Sites in Hainan =

This is a list of Major Sites Protected for their Historical and Cultural Value at the National Level in the Province of Hainan, People's Republic of China.

Site	Date	Location	Image	Coordinates	Designation
Tomb of Hai Rui 海瑞墓	Ming	Haikou	Upload file	20°00′20″N 110°17′44″E	4-75
Double Pagoda of Meilang 美榔双塔	Yuan	Chengmai County	Upload file	19°48′08″N 110°09′46″E	4-86
Former Residence and Grave of Qiu Jun 丘浚故居及墓	Ming	Haikou	Upload file	19°59′14″N 110°21′06″E	4-155
Dongpo Academy 东坡书院	Ming, Qing	Danzhou	Upload file	19°44′26″N 109°21′27″E	4-182
Luobi Cave Site 落笔洞遗址	Palaeolithic	Sanya	Upload file	18°19′49″N 109°32′52″E	5-98
Temple of Five Lords 五公祠	Song to Qing	Haikou	Upload file	20°00′28″N 110°21′32″E	5-441
Qiongya Site of the First Communist Meeting 中共琼崖第一次代表大会旧址	1926	Haikou	Upload file	20°01′39″N 110°21′52″E	5-513
Ganquan Island Site 甘泉岛遗址	Tang to Song	Paracel Islands	Upload file		6-174
North Reef Wreck Sites 北礁沉船遗址	Tang to Qing	Paracel Islands-Spratly Islands-Macclesfield Bank	Upload file		6-175
Old Danzhou City 儋州故城	Tang to Qing	Danzhou	Upload file	19°44′24″N 109°21′18″E	6-176
Tengqiao Tombs 藤桥墓群	Tang to Ming	Sanya	Upload file	18°24′04″N 109°45′04″E	6-272
Xiuying Fort 秀英炮台	Qing	Haikou	Upload file	20°01′16″N 110°18′36″E	6-1031
Cai Family Residence 蔡家宅	Republic of China	Qionghai	Upload file	18°15′10″N 109°30′47″E	6-1032
Former Site of the Soviet Government in Lingshui County 陵水县苏维埃政府旧址	1927-28	Lingshui Li Autonomous County	Upload file	18°30′21″N 110°02′15″E	6-1033
Xinchong Cave Site 信冲洞遗址	Palaeolithic	Changjiang Li Autonomous County	Upload file		7-398
Zhuyaling Site 珠崖岭城址	Han to Tang	Haikou	Upload file		7-399
Huaguang Reef Wreck Sites 华光礁沉船遗址	Song to Qing	Sansha	Upload file	16°09′48″N 111°40′29″E	7-400
Doubing Pagoda 斗柄塔	Ming to Qing	Wenchang	Upload file	20°05′29″N 110°35′46″E	7-1291
Wenchang School House 文昌学宫	Qing	Wenchang	Upload file		7-1292
Yacheng School House 崖城学宫	Qing	Sanya	Upload file		7-1293
Lingaojiao Lighthouse 临高角灯塔	Qing	Lingao County	Upload file		7-1860
Qionghaiguan Site 琼海关旧址	1937	Haikou	Upload file		7-1861
Han Family Residence 韩家宅	1938	Wenchang	Upload file		7-1862
Yangpu Salt Field 洋浦盐田	Song to People's Republic of China	Danzhou	Upload file	19°44′17″N 109°13′05″E	7-1939

As well as sites protected at the national level, there are 108 sites in Hainan that are protected at the provincial level (see 海南省文物保护单位).

== See also ==
- Principles for the Conservation of Heritage Sites in China
- Nandu River Iron Bridge
