= Yangpu =

Yangpu may refer to:

- Yangpu District, a district of Shanghai, China
- Yangpu Peninsula, a peninsula on the northwest coast of Hainan Island, China
- Yangpu Economic Development Zone, an economic development zone on Yangpu Peninsula, Hainan Province, China
- Yangpu, a village in Meichuan, Wuxue, Huanggang, Hubei, China

== See also ==
- Yang Pu (900-939), Chinese Emperor
- Yang Pu (mandarin) (楊溥, 1372–1446), Chinese scholar-official during the Ming dynasty
- Yang Pu (footballer) (born 1978), Chinese football player and manager
