= Port of Yangpu =

Coordinates: 19.730654°N 109.198726°E

Port of Yangpu 洋浦港口
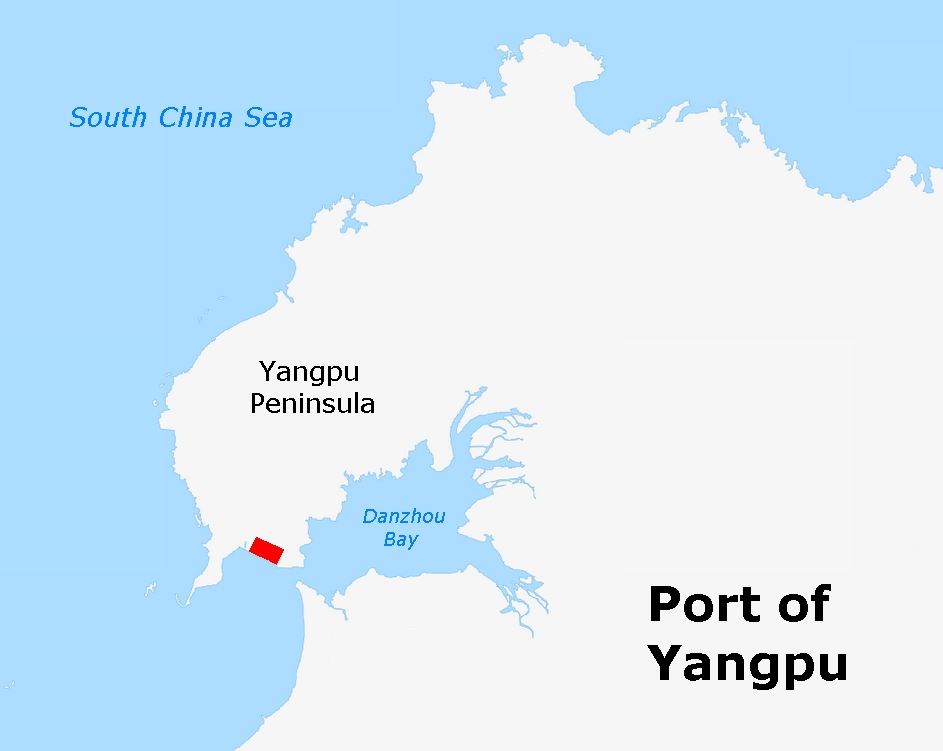
- Map showing location of Port of Yangpu within Yangpu Peninsula
- Click on the map for a fullscreen view

Location
- Country: China
- Location: Yangpu Economic Development Zone, Yangpu Peninsula, Hainan

Statistics
- UN/LOCODE: CNYPG
- Website http://www.ypport.com/

The Port of Yangpu (Chinese: 洋浦港口; pinyin: Yángpǔ Gǎngkǒu) is a seaport located within the Yangpu Economic Development Zone, Yangpu Peninsula, Hainan, China.

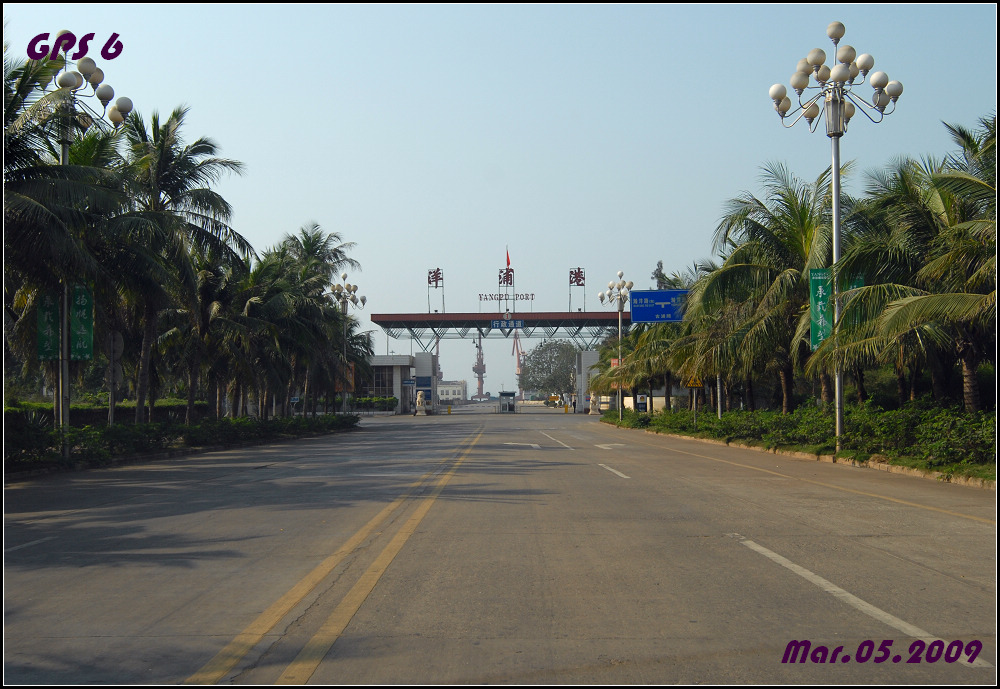

It has 25 berths with 15 shipping lines to Singapore, Vietnam and the Middle East, and is the biggest import and export port in the South China Sea. It is operated by SDIC Yangpu Ltd.
