= Heqing =

Heqing may refer to:

- Heqing County (鹤庆县), Dali Prefecture, Yunnan, China
- Heqing, Hainan (和庆镇), a town in Hainan, China
- Heqing, Shanghai (合庆镇), a town in Pudong, Shanghai, China
- Cai Yuanpei (1868–1940), also known by his courtesy name of Heqing (鶴卿), former president of Peking University
