= Xiuying Fort =

Military fort in Haikou, Hainan, China

Coordinates: 20.02118°N 110.30994°E

Xiuying Fort 秀英炮台
- Haikou, Hainan, China
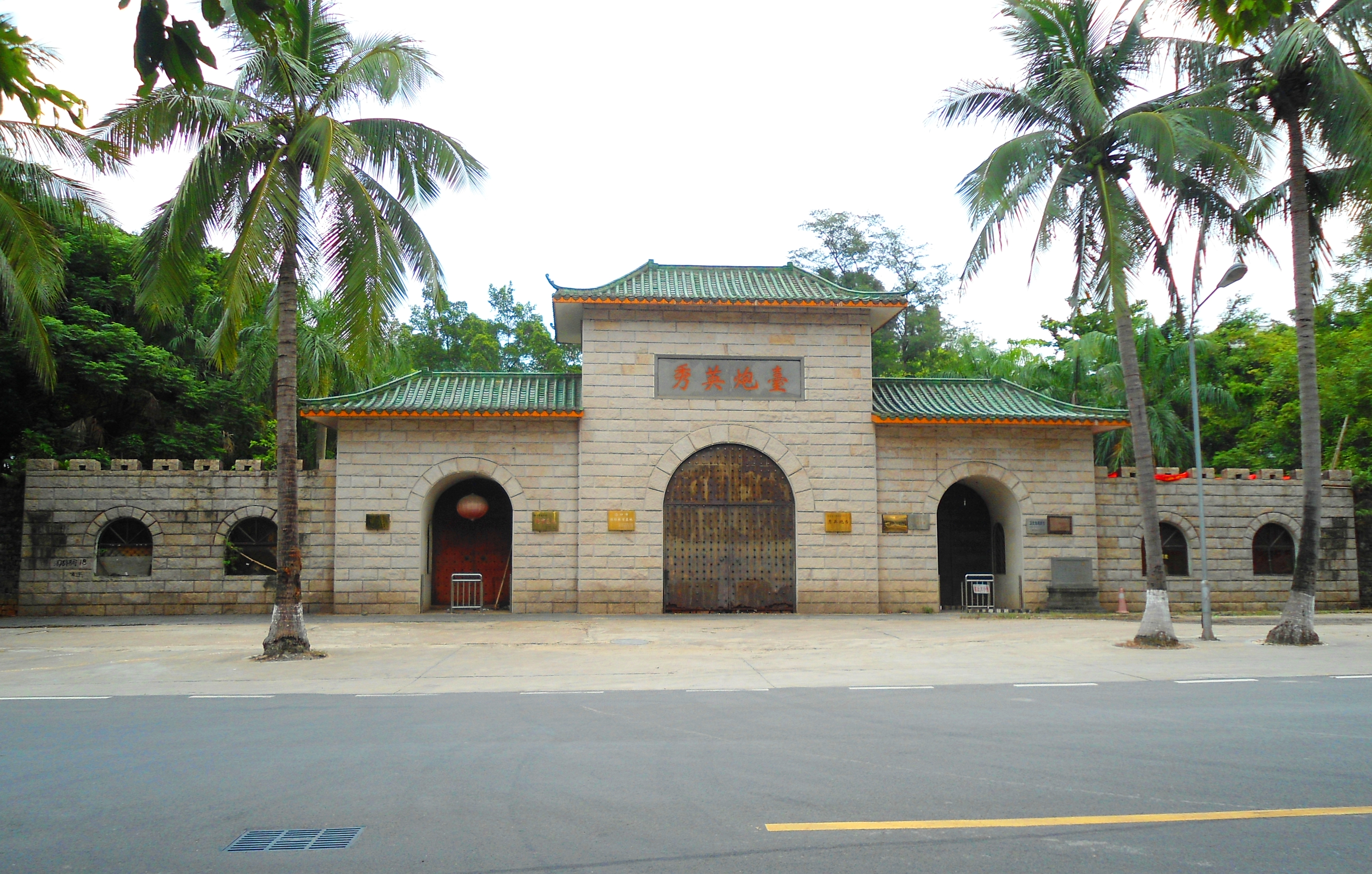

Xiuying Fort (simplified Chinese: 秀英炮台; traditional Chinese: 秀英砲臺; pinyin: Xiùyīng Paòtaí) (designation number: 6-1031) is located in Haikou City, Hainan Province, China.

== History ==
It was constructed in 1890 by the Qing government to counter the threat of the French.

It was used to defend against the 1890 invasion by France, and in 1932 against the Japanese during the Cole attack.

It is assigned the designation number 6-1031.

== See also ==
- Major national historical and cultural sites (Hainan)
