= Danzhou =

Danzhou 儋州市
- Prefecture-level city
- City of Danzhou
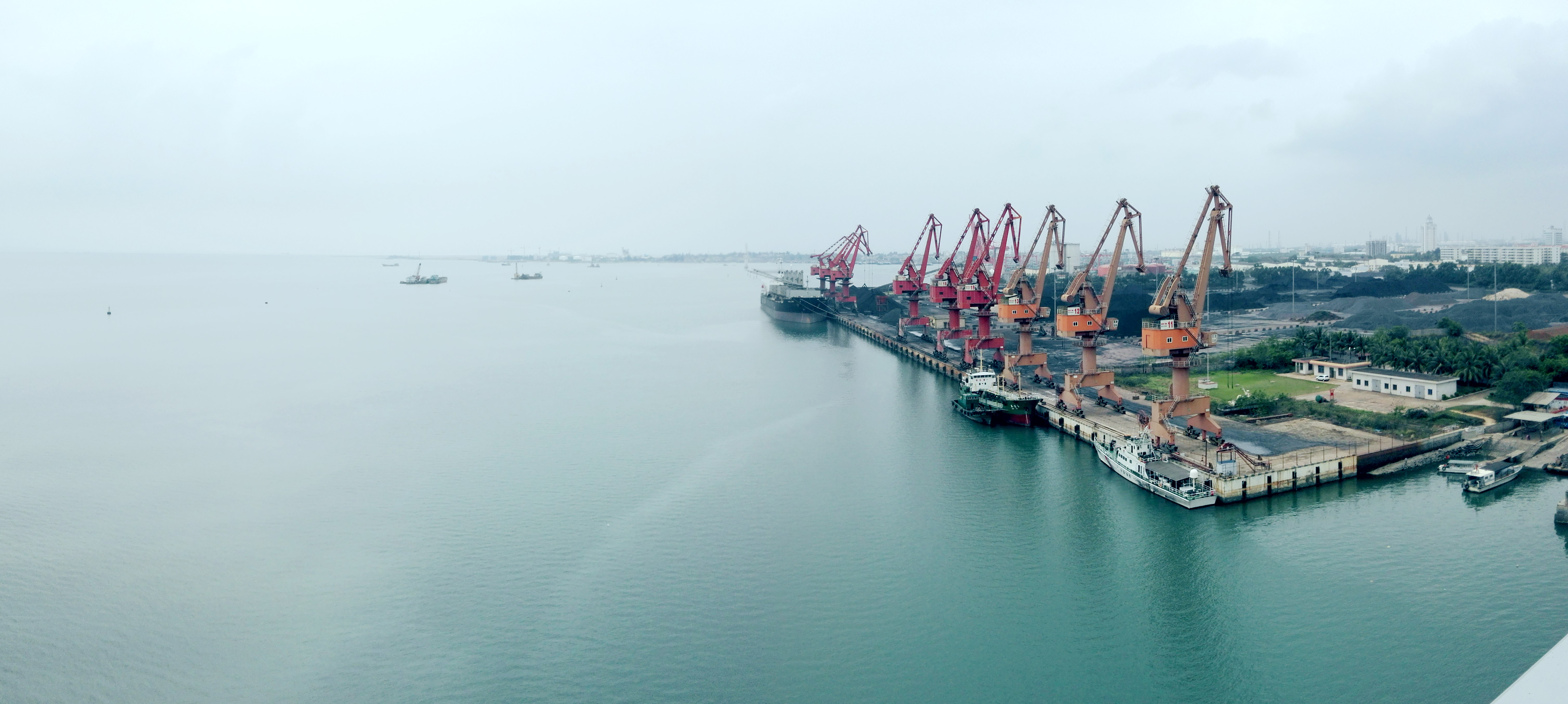
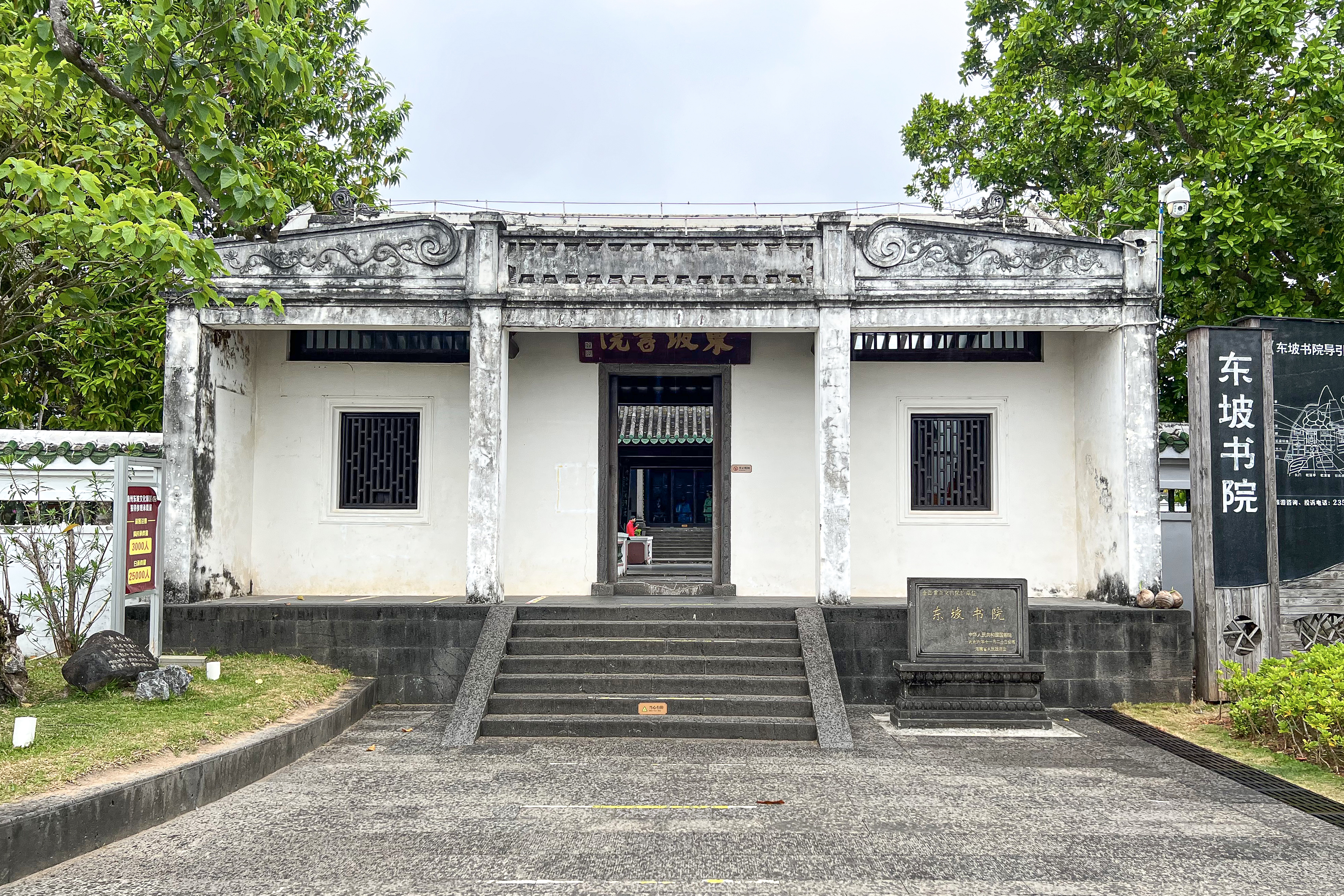
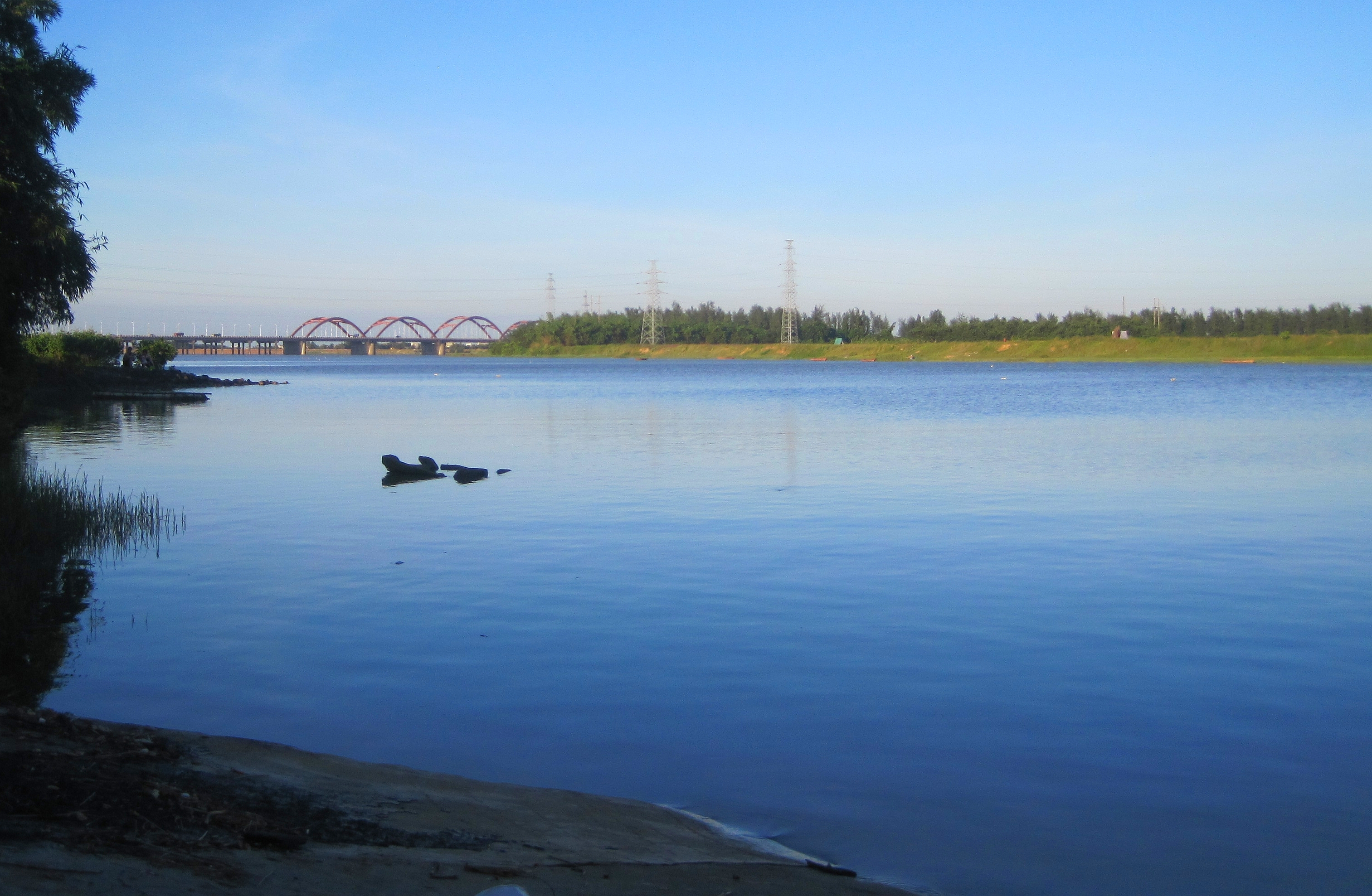
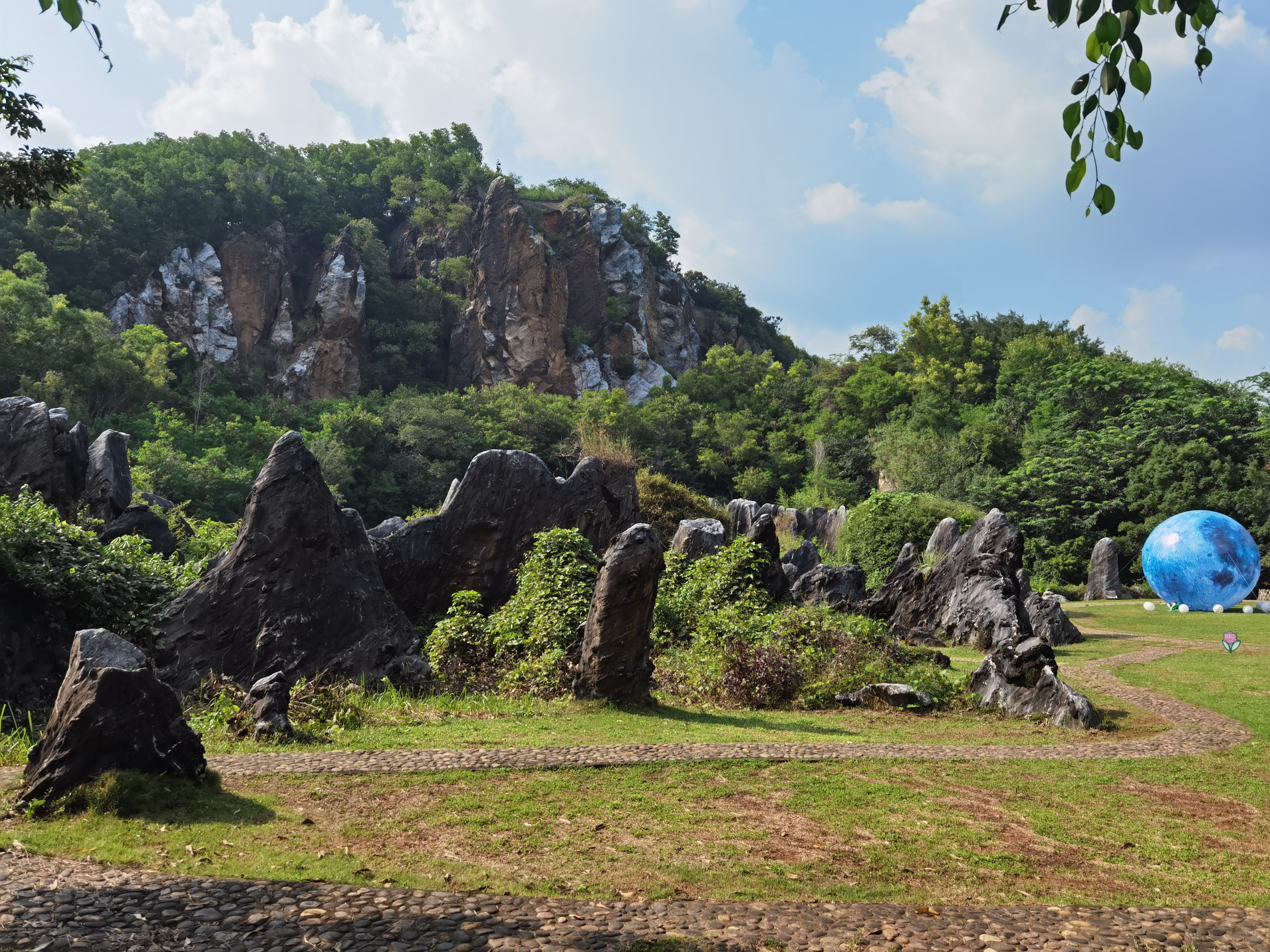
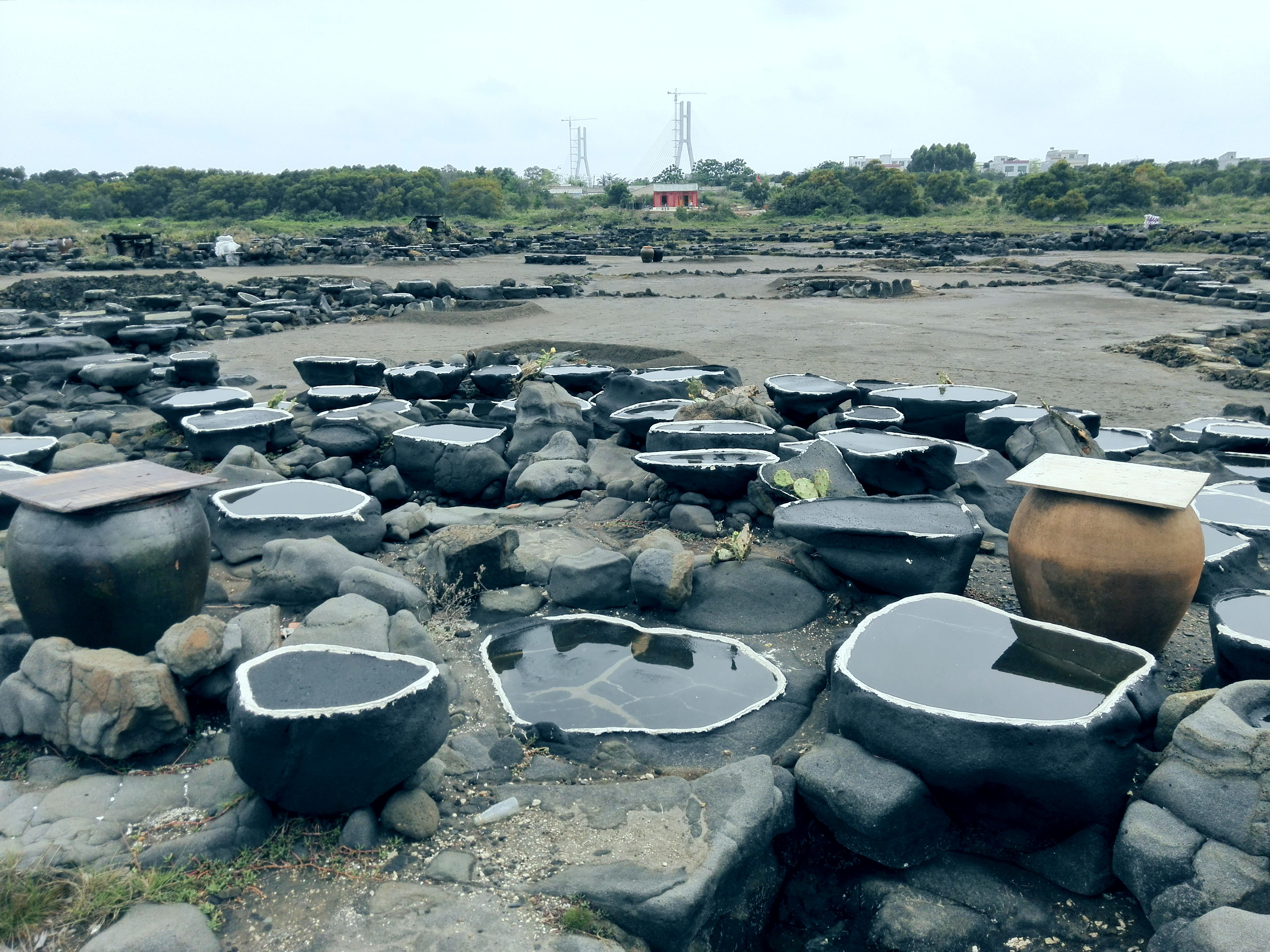
- Yangpu Port Dongpo Academy Nandu River Floral Rock Cave Geopark Yangpu Ancient Salt Field

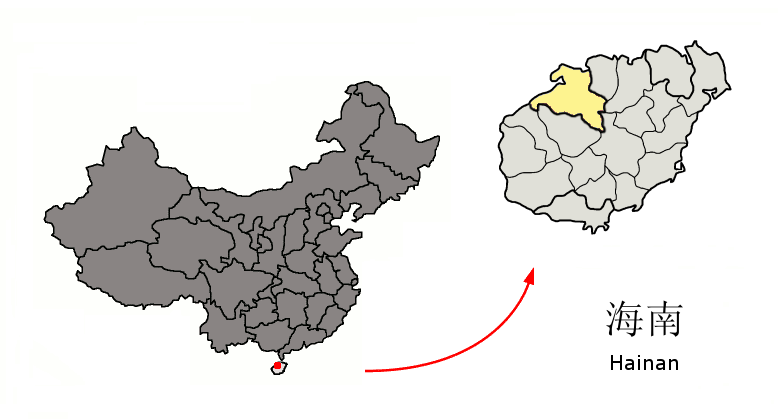
- Location of Danzhou City jurisdiction in Hainan
- Coordinates (Danzhou municipal government): 19°31′15″N 109°34′51″E
- Country: China
- Province: Hainan
- Seat: Nada

Government
  - Party Secretary: Zou Guang
  - Congress Standing Committee Chairman: Vacant
  - Mayor: Chen Yang
  - People's Political Consultative Conference Chairman: Jiang Mingqing

Area
  - Total: 3,394 km^{2} (1,310 sq mi)

Population (2020)
  - Total: 954,259
  - Density: 281.2/km^{2} (728.2/sq mi)

GDP
  - Prefecture-level city: CN¥ 83.2 billion US$ 12.9 billion
  - Per capita: CN¥ 85,755; US$ 13,292
- Time zone: UTC+8 (China Standard Time)
- Postal code: 571700
- ISO 3166 code: CN-HI-04
- Website: danzhou.gov.cn

Danzhou (Chinese: 儋州; pinyin: Dānzhōu) is a prefecture-level city in the northwest of the Chinese island province of Hainan. The administrative seat and urban center of Danzhou is Nada Town. Danzhou was upgraded from a county-level city into a prefecture-level city in February 2015.

== History ==
What is now Danzhou was firstly named Danzhou (儋州) in the 12th century during the Song dynasty and only renamed to Danxian in 1912 after hundreds of years, but later re-obtained its name Danzhou after the Communist takeover in the 1950s.

During World War II, Danzhou was among the top most devastated counties in Hainan as the Japanese had massacred more than 30,000 people in Danzhou, destroying over than 10,000 houses and 300 Danzhou villages.

== Politics and governance ==
=== Incumbent leadership ===
Party Secretary: Zou Guang (邹广), assumed office May 2023

Congress Standing Committee Chairman: Vacant since May 30, 2025

Mayor: Chen Yang (陈阳), assumed office July 28, 2023

People's Political Consultative Conference Chairman: Jiang Mingqing (蒋明清), assumed office January 8, 2023.

=== Danzhou Municipal Public Security Bureau ===
The Danzhou Municipal Public Security Bureau (儋州市公安局) is the municipal law enforcement agency of Danzhou. In 2024, it had a budget of 501.9 million RMB, and operated 177 police vehicles.

== Subdivisions ==
Danzhou is a prefecture-level city of the Hainan province. An uncommon administrative feature is that it has no county-level division. The city government directly administers over 17 towns (镇; zhèn), one state-run institute, and four state-run farms plus an economic development zone:

Map
Name	Simplified Chinese	Hanyu Pinyin	Population (2010 census)	Area (km^{2})	Density (/km^{2})	Division code	Residential communities	Administrative villages
Chengqu Area	城区片区	Chéngqū Piànqū	562,863	1,468.7	383.24	—	8 towns	
Nada (Note: Including Guoying Xilian Farm)	那大镇	Nàdà Zhèn	256,652	179.2	1432.20	460400100	10	20
Heqing	和庆镇	Héqìng Zhèn	20,729	188.4	110.03	460400101	1	11
Nanfeng	南丰镇	Nánfēng Zhèn	23,669	260.3	90.93	460400102	1	10
Dacheng (Note: Including Guoying Xipei Farm and South China Institute of Tropical Crops)	大成镇	Dàchéng Zhèn	84,620	295.4	286.46	460400103	1	5
Yaxing (Note: Including Guoying Bayi Farm)	雅星镇	Yǎxīng Zhèn	76,427	170	449.57	460400104	2	12
Lanyang (Note: Including Guoying Lanyang Farm)	兰洋镇	Lányáng Zhèn	23,711	186.9	126.86	460400105	1	14
Guangcun	光村镇	Guāngcūn Zhèn	27,803	72	386.15	460400106	1	10
Dongcheng	东成镇	Dōngchéng Zhèn	49,252	116.5	422.76	460400115	1	21
Binhai Area	滨海片区	Bīnhǎi Piànqū	369,493	811.6	455.26	—	1 subdistrict, 8 towns	
Sandu Administrative Zone (Note: Including Yangpu Economic Development Zone)	三都区	Sān dū qū	76,757	88	872.23	460401001		9
Mutang	木棠镇	Mùtáng Zhèn	40,373	84	480.63	460400107		25
Haitou	海头镇	Hǎitóu Zhèn	34,648	195.8	176.96	460400108	4	10
Eman	峨蔓镇	Émàn Zhèn	17,317	70.5	245.63	460400109		13
Wangwu	王五镇	Wángwǔ Zhèn	24,274	126.3	192.19	460400111	1	8
Baimajing	白马井镇	Báimǎjǐng Zhèn	59,585	54.7	1089.30	460400112	6	15
Zhonghe	中和镇	Zhōnghé Zhèn	31,646	51.5	614.48	460400113	1	11
Paipu	排浦镇	Páipǔ Zhèn	17,577	95.8	183.47	460400114	1	7
Xinzhou	新州镇	Xīnzhōu Zhèn	67,316	45	1495.91	460400116	12	19

== Demographics ==
The city's population was 932,362 in 2010. The Han population is 857,342 and the minority population is 75,020.

== Language ==
The Danzhou natives mainly speak the Danzhou dialect of Yue language, unlike Hainan Min language that is spoken throughout most of eastern Hainan.

== Transportation ==
The area will be served by Danzhou Airport, an under-construction airport approximately 25 km (16 mi) northeast of Nada. It will be international-class, built to handle the increasing number of tourists visiting the area. The airport is scheduled for completion in 2022.

The Hainan Western Ring High-Speed Railway also provides access.

== National priority protected sites ==
- Dongpo Academy (4th Batch, 1996)
- Danzhou ancient city (6th Batch, 2006)
- Yangpu Ancient Salt Field (7th Batch, 2013)

== Climate ==
The area has a tropical wet and dry climate (Köppen Aw), featuring very warm weather all year around. Monsoonal influences are strong, with a relatively lengthy wet season and a pronounced dry season. The coolest month is January, with an average high temperature of 22.7 °C (72.9 °F), while the hottest, unlike much of the rest of China, is June, with an average high temperature of 33.7 °C (92.7 °F); the mean annual high temperature is 29.2 °C (84.6 °F). Water temperatures remain above 19 °C (66.2 °F) year-round.

Climate data for Danzhou, elevation 169 m (554 ft), (1991–2020 normals, extremes 1955–present)
Month	Jan	Feb	Mar	Apr	May	Jun	Jul	Aug	Sep	Oct	Nov	Dec	Year
Record high °C (°F)	34.2 (93.6)	37.4 (99.3)	38.7 (101.7)	41.2 (106.2)	41.1 (106.0)	38.6 (101.5)	39.1 (102.4)	37.0 (98.6)	35.9 (96.6)	35.3 (95.5)	34.2 (93.6)	33.2 (91.8)	41.2 (106.2)
Mean daily maximum °C (°F)	22.7 (72.9)	24.9 (76.8)	28.6 (83.5)	31.5 (88.7)	33.2 (91.8)	33.7 (92.7)	33.3 (91.9)	32.5 (90.5)	31.1 (88.0)	29.1 (84.4)	26.5 (79.7)	22.9 (73.2)	29.2 (84.5)
Daily mean °C (°F)	18.0 (64.4)	19.6 (67.3)	22.7 (72.9)	25.7 (78.3)	27.5 (81.5)	28.5 (83.3)	28.1 (82.6)	27.5 (81.5)	26.5 (79.7)	24.7 (76.5)	22.2 (72.0)	18.8 (65.8)	24.2 (75.5)
Mean daily minimum °C (°F)	15.1 (59.2)	16.4 (61.5)	19.1 (66.4)	22.2 (72.0)	24.2 (75.6)	25.3 (77.5)	25.0 (77.0)	24.5 (76.1)	23.7 (74.7)	22.0 (71.6)	19.5 (67.1)	16.2 (61.2)	21.1 (70.0)
Record low °C (°F)	0.4 (32.7)	6.7 (44.1)	5.3 (41.5)	13.0 (55.4)	16.1 (61.0)	19.4 (66.9)	20.6 (69.1)	21.2 (70.2)	18.0 (64.4)	12.2 (54.0)	8.6 (47.5)	3.7 (38.7)	0.4 (32.7)
Average precipitation mm (inches)	18.9 (0.74)	19.6 (0.77)	45.1 (1.78)	92.8 (3.65)	231.0 (9.09)	209.8 (8.26)	267.6 (10.54)	363.2 (14.30)	323.1 (12.72)	234.6 (9.24)	82.2 (3.24)	43.8 (1.72)	1,931.7 (76.05)
Average precipitation days (≥ 0.1 mm)	9.8	8.8	9.3	11.4	17.9	15.6	17.4	18.9	18.0	12.6	9.3	9.7	158.7
Average relative humidity (%)	83	81	79	77	78	77	79	83	85	82	82	83	81
Mean monthly sunshine hours	121.0	124.9	156.4	174.3	206.2	204.8	213.9	194.7	157.1	159.5	131.7	102.0	1,946.5
Percentage possible sunshine	35	38	42	46	51	52	53	49	43	44	39	30	44
Source: China Meteorological Administration all-time extreme temperatureall-time October record

== See also ==
- List of administrative divisions of Hainan
- Danzhou dialect
- Ocean Flower Island
