= Dongpo Academy =

Coordinates: 19.742746°N 109.353397°E

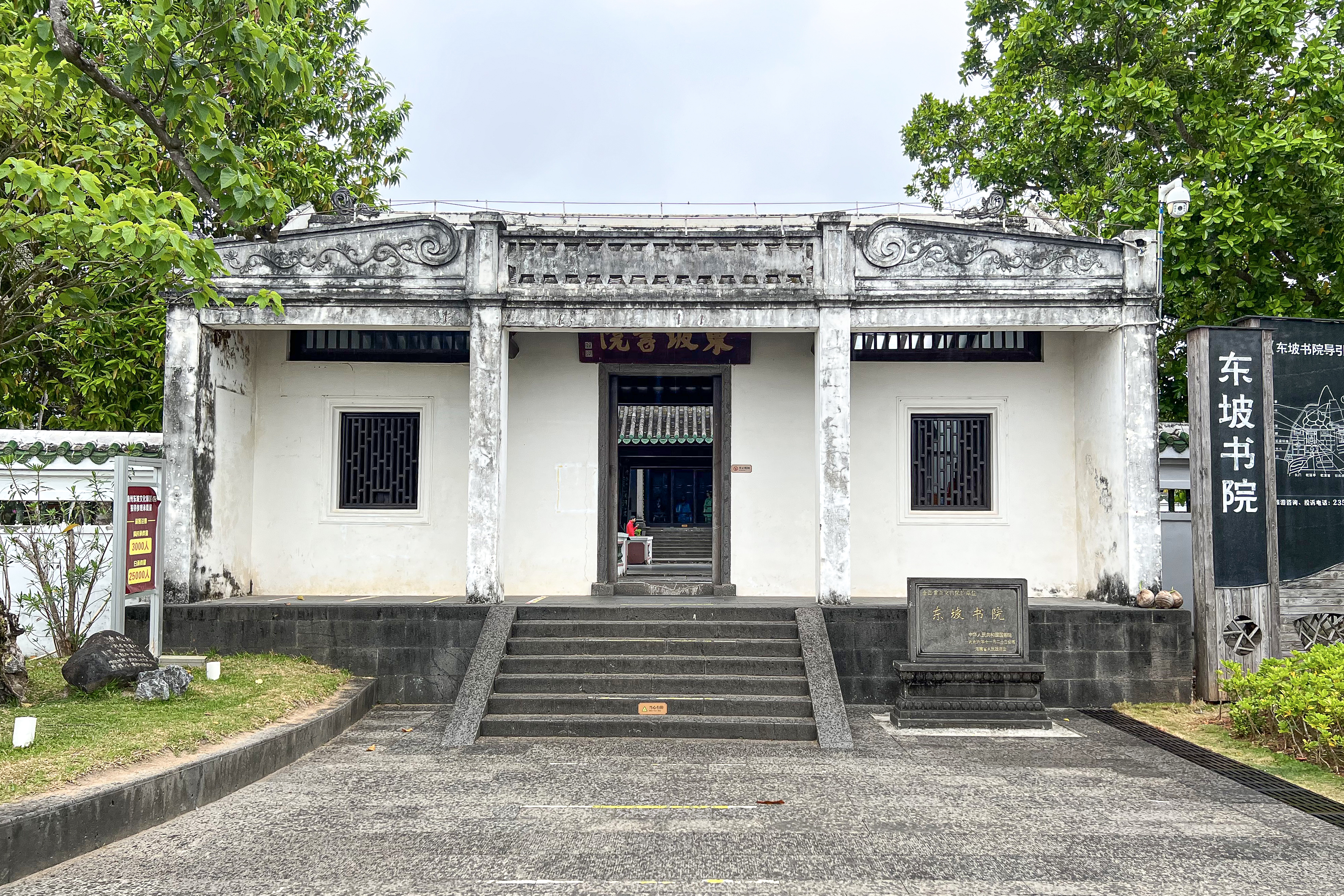
Entrance

The Dongpo Academy or Dongpo Shuyuan (Chinese: 东坡书院; pinyin: Dōngpō Shūyuàn), was an academy located in Hainan, China. It was originally built in 1098 in memory of the Song dynasty literary figure, Su Dongpo, who was exiled here.

The Zaijiutang (载酒堂 Zài jiǔ táng) is the building where Su Dongpo lived and gave lectures during exile. The Dongpo Academy is located near the town of Zhonghe, 40 km from Danzhou (Nada) city. It is now a tourist attraction.
