= Nada, Danzhou =

Nada 儋州市 那大镇
- Town
- Town of Nada, City of Danzhou
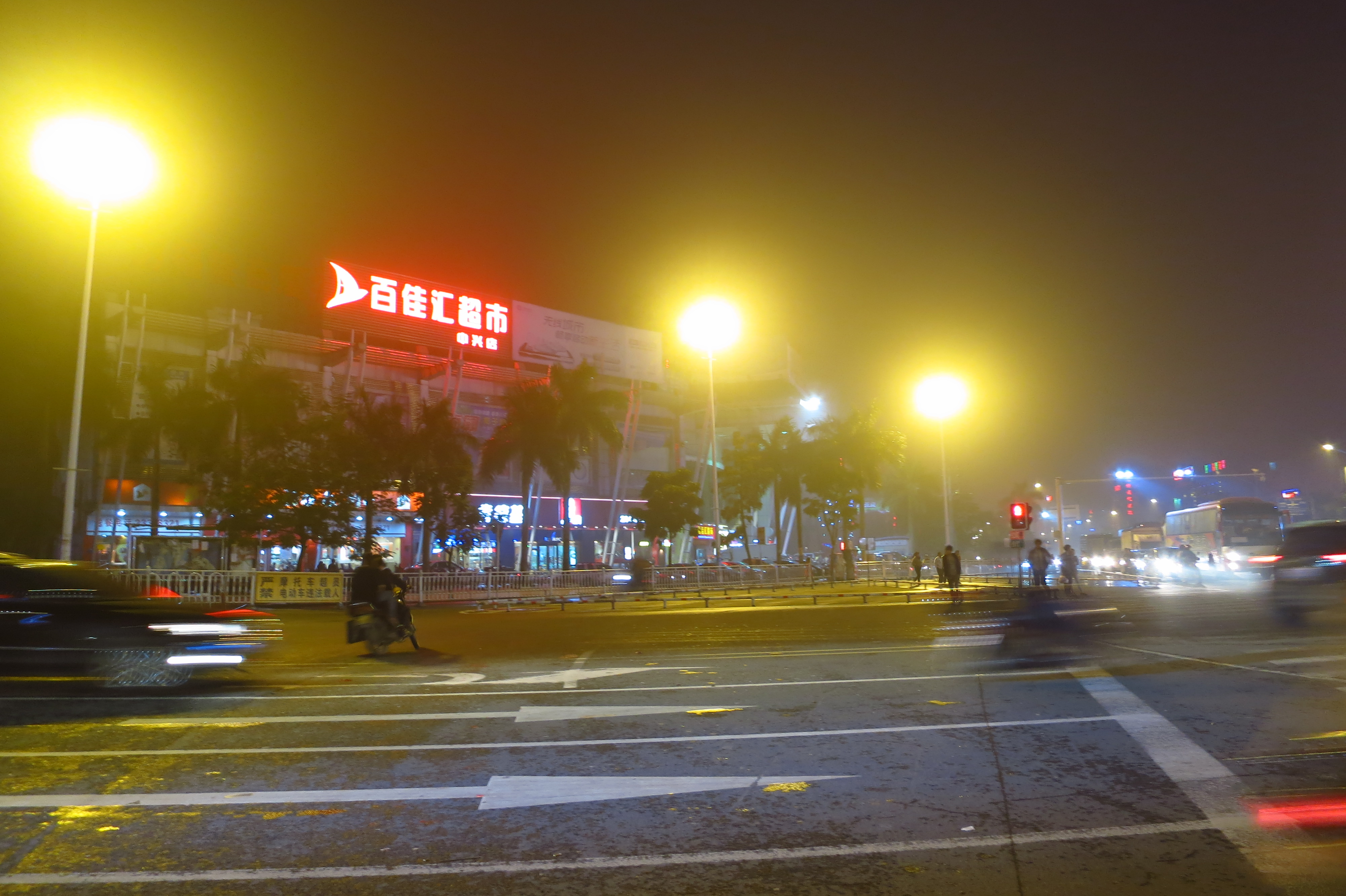
- Nada at night

- Location in Hainan
- Coordinates (Danzhou government): 19°31′15″N 109°34′50″E
- Country: People's Republic of China
- Province: Hainan
- Prefecture-level city: Danzhou

Area
  - Town: 194.05 km^{2} (74.92 sq mi)
  - Urban: 25 km^{2} (9.7 sq mi)

Population (2010)
  - Town: 220,000
  - Density: 1,100/km^{2} (2,900/sq mi)
- Time zone: UTC+8 (China Standard)
- Website: www.dna.gov.cn

Nada Town (Chinese: 那大镇; pinyin: Nàdà) is a township under Danzhou city, Hainan province, China. Nada was established more than 400 years ago, and has been the administrative seat and urban center of Danzhou (formerly Dan County) since 1958. It has a population of 220,000 as of 2010.

== Location ==
Nada is located in northwestern Hainan, 137 kilometres (85 mi) from the provincial capital Haikou city, and 288 kilometres (179 mi) from Sanya by expressway. It covers a total area of 238.76 square kilometres (92.19 sq mi), with a built-up area of 25 square kilometres (9.7 sq mi).

== History ==
Nada was founded more than 400 years ago with the merger of the villages of Nanian (那念) and Datong (大同). The name Nada was formed from the first syllables of the two villages. During the early 1950s, Nada was part of the seventh district of Dan County (Danxian). Nada County was established in May 1957, with Nada Town as its seat. In December 1958, Nada County was merged into Dan County, but the seat of Dan County was moved from Xinzhou to Nada Town. The town was called Nada Commune from 1958 to 1981, and its outskirts were split off as Qianjin Commune (later Qianjin District) in 1977, but merged back into Nada in 1987.

American Christian missionaries called the town Nodoa, and established a station there in 1888.

== Administrative divisions ==
As of 2013, Nada has 11 residential communities (社区), 21 villages, and 8 farms under its administration.

== Demographics ==
As of the 2010 National Census, Nada has a population of 220,000. Its residents speak a variety of languages and dialects, including Danzhou dialect, Cantonese, Hakka, Hainanese, Hlai, Miao, and Lingao. Mandarin is also widely spoken.

== Economy ==
In 2013, Nada's GDP grew by 23.3% to 5.8 billion yuan, including 0.5 billion from the primary sector, 2.33 billion from the secondary sector, and 2.96 billion from the tertiary sector (service). The per capita disposable income for urban residents was 22,310 yuan.

== Transportation ==
The area will be served by Danzhou Airport, an under-construction airport in approximately 25 km northeast of Nada. It will be international-class, built to handle the increasing number of tourists visiting the area.

== See also ==
- List of township-level divisions of Hainan
