= Danzhou Airport =

- IATA: none; ICAO: none

Summary
- Airport type: Public
- Location: Danzhou, Hainan, China
- Coordinates: 19.6945°N 109.7282°E

Map
- Location of the airport Danzhou Airport (China)

Danzhou Airport (Chinese: 儋州机场) is an under-construction airport in approximately 25 km northeast of Nada, Danzhou, Hainan, China. It will be international-class, built to handle the increasing number of tourists visiting the area.
