= Heqing, Danzhou =

Heqing 儋州市 和庆镇
- Town
- Town of Heqing, City of Danzhou
- Location in Hainan
- Coordinates (Danzhou government): 19°31′43″N 109°38′07″E
- Country: People's Republic of China
- Province: Hainan
- Prefecture-level city: Danzhou

Area
  - Total: 188.4 km^{2} (72.7 sq mi)

Population (2010)
  - Total: 20,729
  - Density: 110.0/km^{2} (285.0/sq mi)
- Time zone: UTC+8 (China Standard)

Heqing (和庆镇) is a township under Danzhou city, Hainan province, China. It has a population of 20,720 as of 2010.
