= Yangpu Ancient Salt Field =

Hainanese Archeological heritage site

Coordinates: 19.740353°N 109.213715°E

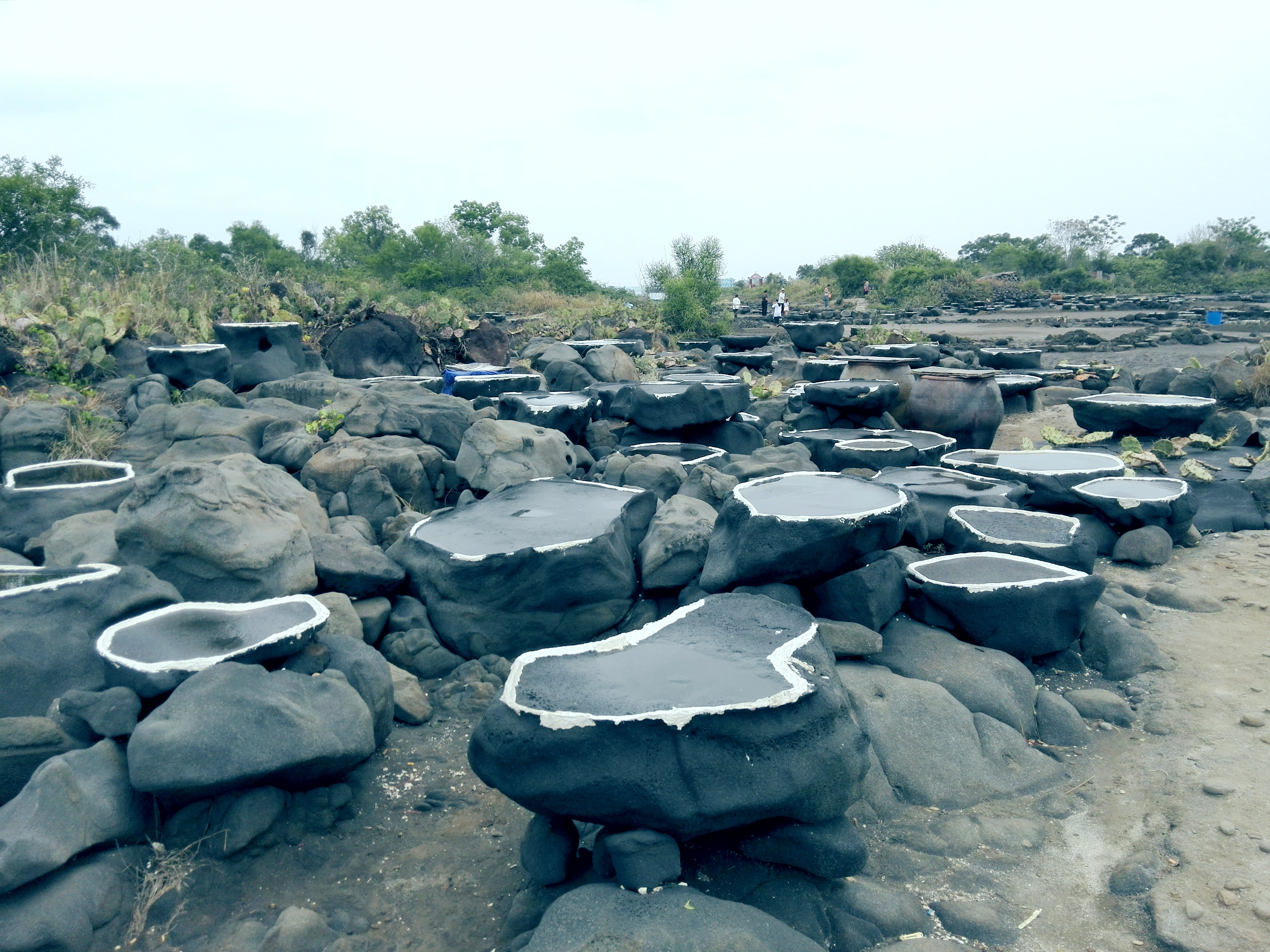
Stones are cut flat on top with a thin rim. Seawater remains from high tide. It then evaporates leaving the salt, which is collected.

The Yangpu Ancient Salt Field (simplified Chinese: 洋浦千年古盐田; traditional Chinese: 洋浦千年古鹽田; pinyin: Yángpǔ qiānnián gǔ yántián) is an archeological heritage site in Yantian village, on the Yangpu Peninsula in Hainan, China. The site is an example of salt's various roles in Chinese history. The area comprises more than 1,000 stones, cut flat on top, with a trough and narrow rim, which are used to evaporate seawater to produce salt.

== Salt production ==
Workers chiselled troughs into the volcanic rock, leaving the stones with a thin rim around the edge to contain the water. During high tide, the surface of the stones becomes filled with seawater. During low tide, this evaporates, leaving the salt, which is then collected. It is a labour intensive process. There are around 30 families who still produce salt using this method today. The salt is renowned for its flavour, and is often used in Chinese traditional medicine.

== History ==
The area was established around 800 AD, during the Northern Song Dynasty, when a group of salt workers migrating from Putian city in Fujian province moved to Yangpu. The workers used the volcanic rocks, chiselling out the salt troughs, with a small rim, to pioneer the method of sun-drying to produce salt, which is still used today. Today, only a small group of villagers continue to make salt using this method.

In 2024, the site was inscribed on China's National Industrial Heritage List.
