= Zhonghe, Hainan =

Zhonghe 中和镇
- Town
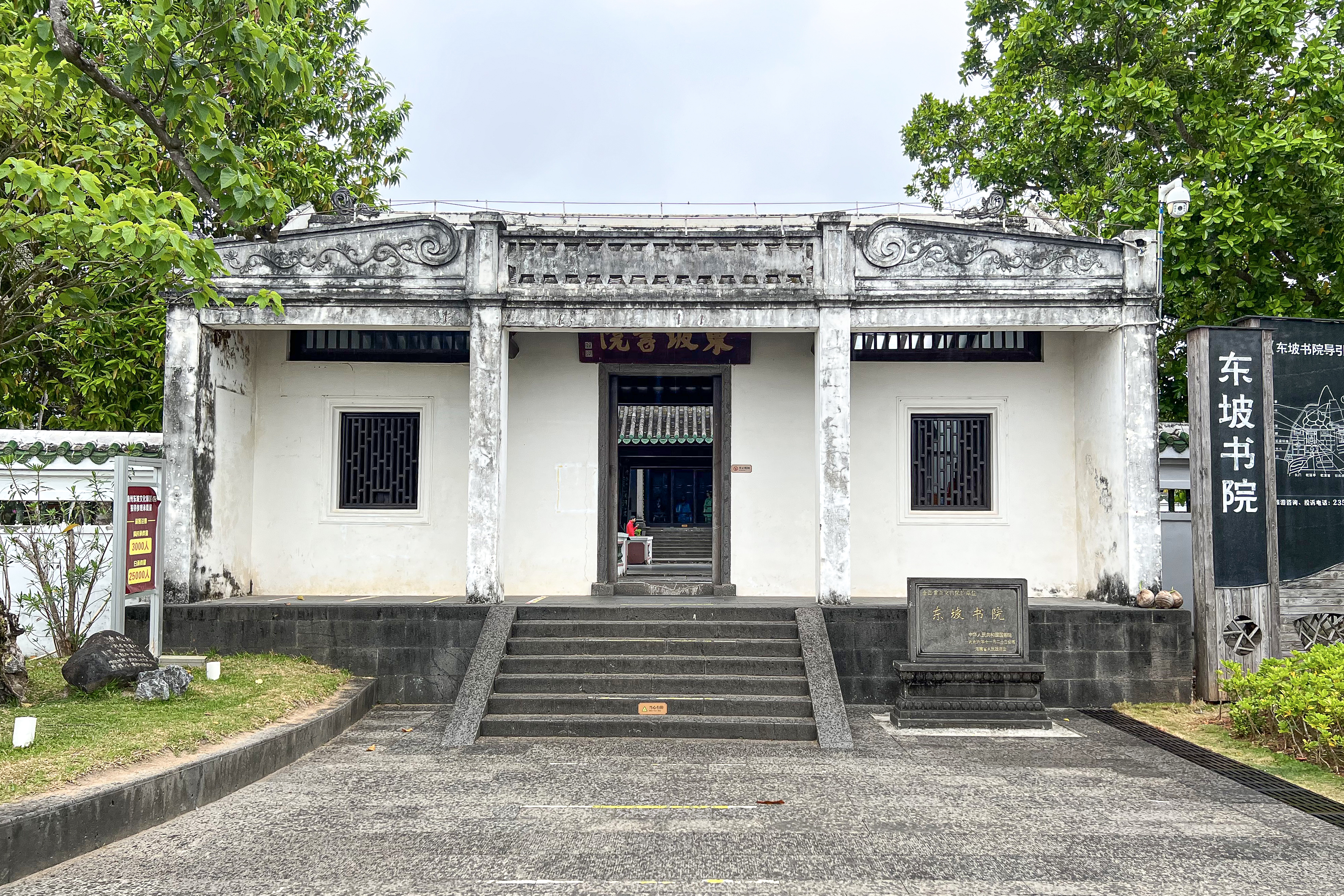

- Location in Hainan
- Coordinates (Danzhou government): 19°44′37″N 109°20′49″E
- Country: People's Republic of China
- Province: Hainan
- Prefecture-level city: Danzhou

Area
  - Total: 55.1 km^{2} (21.3 sq mi)

Population
  - Total: 31,646
  - Density: 574/km^{2} (1,490/sq mi)
- Time zone: UTC+8 (China Standard)

Zhonghe (Chinese: 中和; pinyin: zhōnghé) is a town in Danzhou city, northwestern Hainan province, China. As of 2020, it administers Zhonghe Residential Community and the following 11 villages:

- Gaodi Village (高第村)
- Shuijing Village (水井村)
- Huanlong Village (环龙村)
- Heping Village (和平村)
- Shanchun Village (山春村)
- Lingchun Village (灵春村)
- Hengshan Village (横山村)
- Wuli Village (五里村)
- Qili Village (七里村)
- Chang Village (长村)
- Huangjiang Village (黄江村)

== See also ==
- List of township-level divisions of Hainan
