= Yangpu Economic Development Zone =

Yangpu Economic Development Zone 洋浦经济开发区
- Economic Development Zone
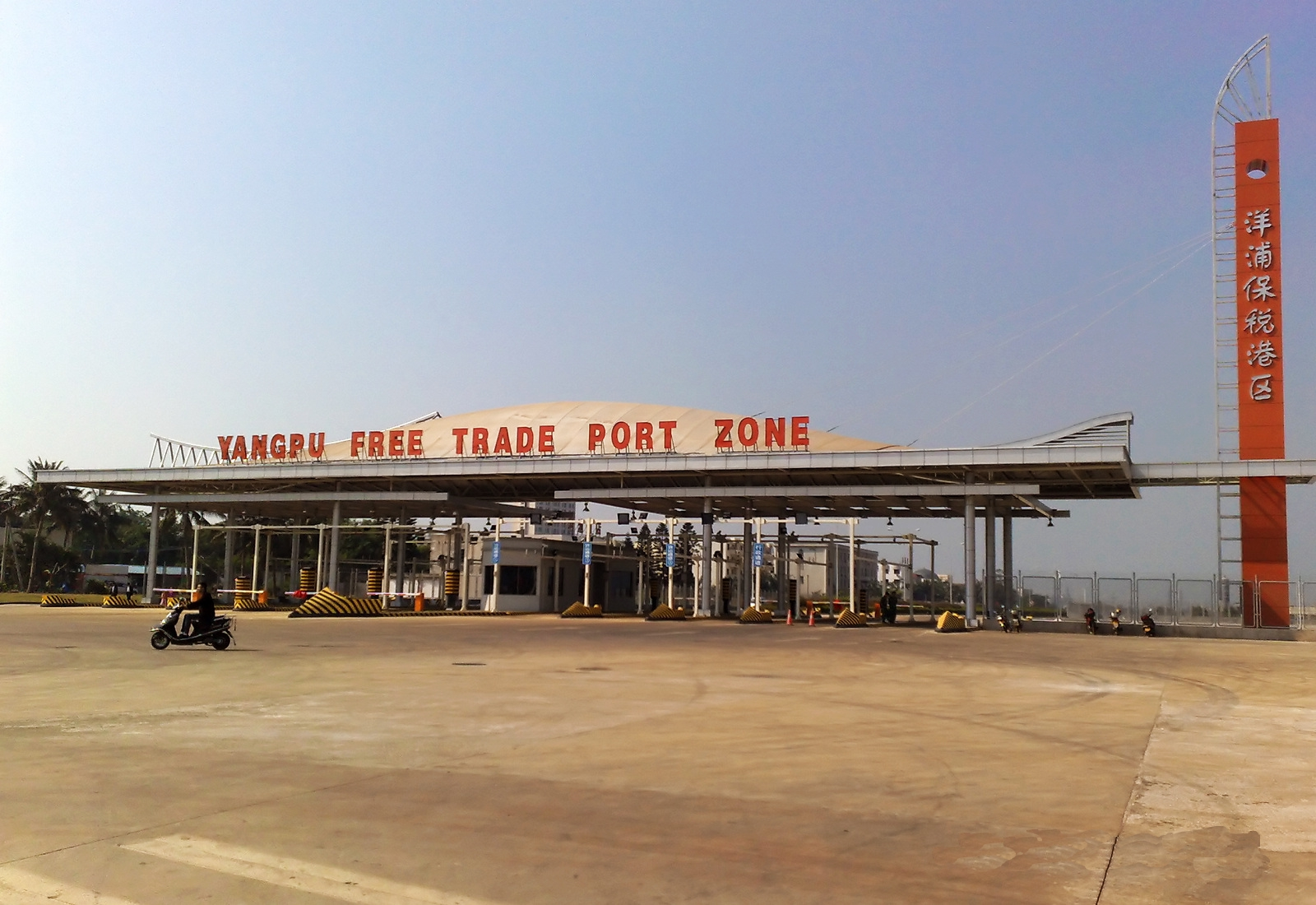

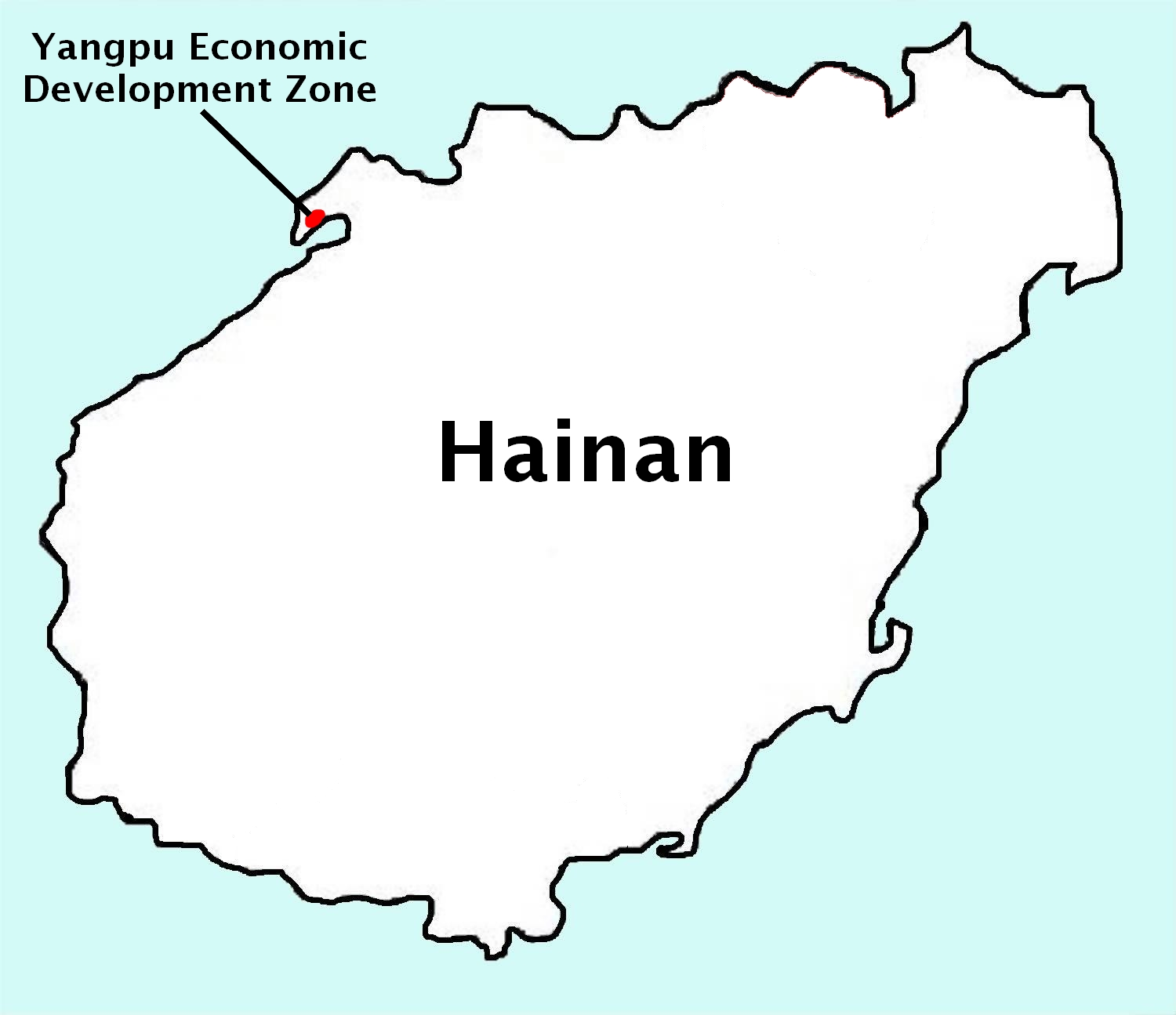
- Location in Hainan
- Coordinates: 19°44′4.4″N 109°12′40.3″E
- Country: People's Republic of China
- Province: Hainan
- Established: 1992

Area
  - Land: 31 km^{2} (12 sq mi)
- Time zone: UTC+8 (China standard time)
- Website: yangpu.hainan.gov.cn

Yángpǔ Economic Development Zone is an area of the Yangpu Peninsula, Hainan province, China. This zone, covering 31 km^{2} (12 sq mi), contains a port, oil refinery, petroleum commercial reserve base, power station, and the town of Yangpu. The area, Hainan's largest economic zone, is located on the northwestern coast of the island, about 140 km (87 mi) west of Haikou, the provincial capital. It is the first development zone approved for lease to foreign investors by the Chinese government.

== History ==
During 1983–1989, research was conducted for building a deepwater harbour with studies of sedimentation of the embayments.

The zone was officially established by State Council in March 1992, and was originally intended to be an export-oriented industrial area focusing on advanced technology with the development of tertiary industries.

In August 1992, the land of the 31 km^{2} (12 sq mi) zone was leased to Kumagai Gumi (Hong Kong) Ltd. (later renamed HongKong Construction Holdings), for development for a maximum of 70 years. An additional area of 38 km^{2} (15 sq mi) outside the zone has been designated for future development.

In September 1993, the customs area was enclosed an operations commenced.

== Industry ==
More than 8 billion RMB has been spent on infrastructure within the zone. This includes state investment as well as foreign investment. The Ministry of Transportation funded the first stage of the Yangpu Harbor, which was opened in 1991. This includes a 3,000-tonne berth and two 2,000-tonne berths. The second stage will cost more than 780 million RMB, and will expand the capacity to 2.5 million tonnes with the addition of three 35,000-tonne berths. It is estimated that the capacity for handling cargo will be 220 million tons in 2020.

The Sinopec Yangpu refinery has the capacity to process 8 million mt/year of crude oil. LPG output is approximately 40,000-45,000 mt/month. Around 5,000 mt of this is sold to Hainan province. The remaining 35,000-40,000 mt is sold to Guangdong province, or exported to Hong Kong. The refinery has an LPG storage capacity of approximately 30,000 cubic meters.

The zone also has a 448,000 KW power plant to provide electricity to the area.

== Geography ==
The entire district, located on the Yangpu Peninsula is flat, all less than 100 metres above sea level. The zone's foundation consists of clay, sandy loam, basalt and quartz sand. Yangpu's coastline contains 20 bays with a deep-water channel near to the shoreline.
