= Yangpu Peninsula =

Peninsula in Hainan, China

Coordinates: 19.781888°N 109.207878°E

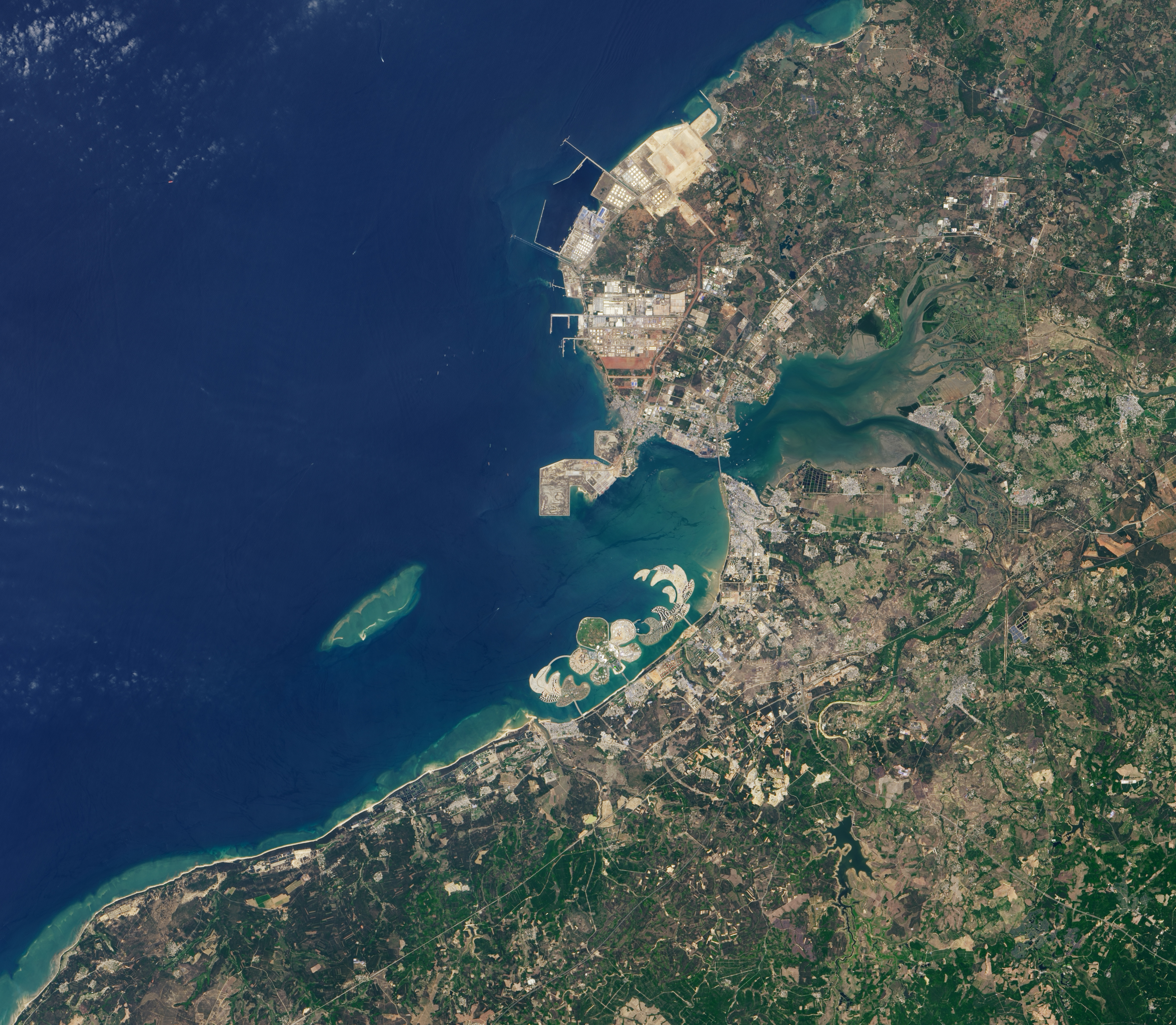
Satellite picture of Yangpu Peninsula

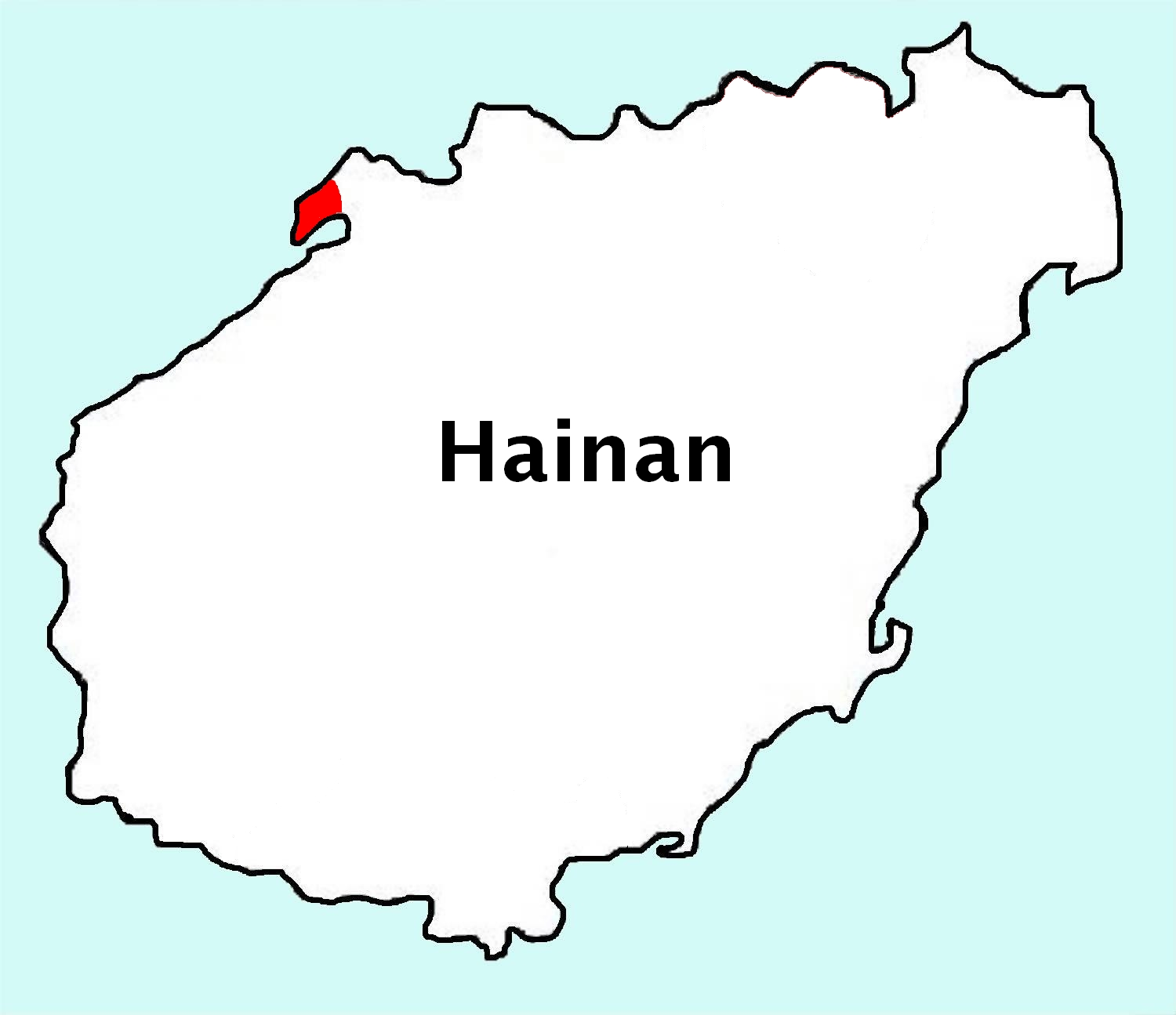

The Yangpu Peninsula (simplified Chinese: 洋浦半岛; traditional Chinese: 洋浦半島; pinyin: Yángpǔ Bàndǎo) is a peninsula located in Danzhou, on the northwestern coast of Hainan Province, China. It has a 110 km (68 mi) coastline containing many natural harbors. An expressway connects the peninsula to Haikou, the capital of the province, which is 140 km (87 mi) to the east.

== Geology ==
It has plentiful deposits of titanium.

== Yangpu Economic Development Zone ==
The zone is an area covering 30 km^{2} (12 sq mi). that contains the Port of Yangpu, an oil refinery, a petroleum commercial reserve base, a 448,000 K power station, and the town of Yangpu. The area is Hainan's largest economic zone and the first development zone approved for lease to foreign investors by the Chinese government.

== Yangpu Ancient Salt Field ==
This archeological heritage site is located in Yantian village. The area comprises more than 1,000 stones, cut flat on top, used to dry seawater to produce salt.

== See also ==
- Ocean Flower Island
