= Haikou Television =

Chinese television and radio station

HKTV

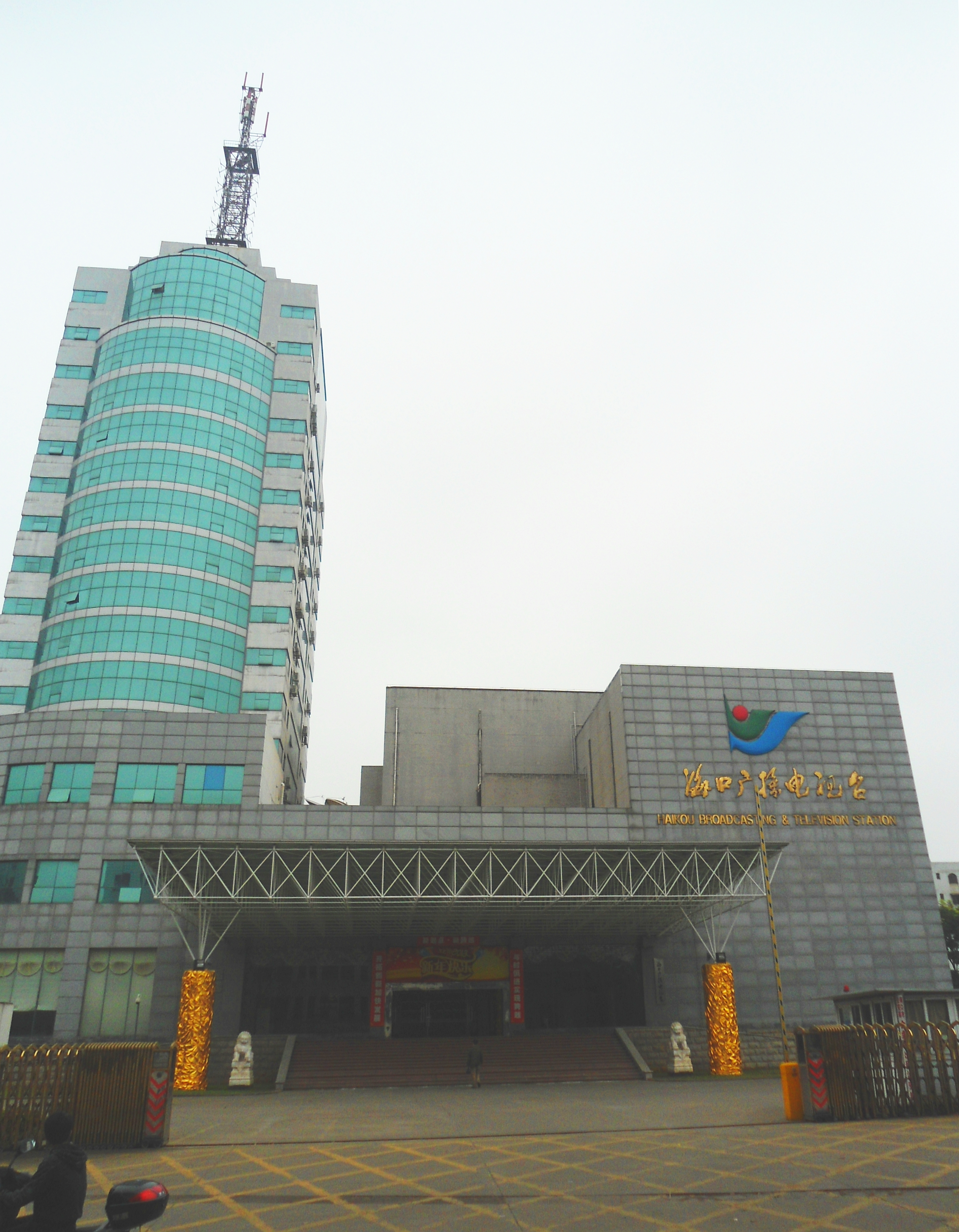

Hainan Province; China
- City: Haikou

Links
- Website: http://www.haikoutv.com

Haikou Television (HKTV) (Chinese: 海口电视台) is a television and radio station in Hainan, China. It broadcast three television channels, and 3 radio channels.

The station broadcasts a total of 11,000 hours annually, producing approximately 49 television programs. The signal strength covers 15 square kilometers. Broadcasts started on October 6, 1984, following SARFT approval for UHF channel 32 from the Hainan Wanghai International Hotel.

== Television channels ==
- Haikou TV Comprehensive News Channel
- Haikou TV Live Entertainment Channel
- Haikou TV Economic Channel
