= Hailam =

Hailam may refer to:

- Hainan, an island province of China
- Hainan people, the indigenous people of Hainan
- Hainanese, the language spoken by the Hainan people
