= Guangdong Romanization =

Romanization schemes for Chinese languages

Guangdong Romanization refers to the four romanization schemes published by the Guangdong Provincial Education Department in 1960 for transliterating Cantonese, Teochew, Hakka and Hainanese. The schemes utilized similar elements with some differences in order to adapt to their respective spoken varieties.

In certain respects, Guangdong romanization resembles pinyin in its distinction of the alveolar initials z, c, s from the alveolo-palatal initials j, q, x and in its use of b, d, g to represent the unaspirated stop consonants /p t k/. In addition, it makes use of the medial u before the rime rather than representing it as w in the initial when it follows g or k.

Guangdong romanization makes use of diacritics to represent certain vowels. This includes the use of the circumflex, acute accent and diaeresis in the letters ê, é and ü, respectively. In addition, it uses -b, -d, -g to represent the coda consonants /p t k/ rather than -p, -t, -k like other romanization schemes in order to be consistent with their use as unaspirated plosives in the initial. Tones are marked by superscript numbers rather than by diacritics.

== Cantonese ==
The scheme for Cantonese is outlined in "The Cantonese Transliteration Scheme" (simplified Chinese: 广州话拼音方案; traditional Chinese: 廣州話拼音方案; pinyin: Guǎngzhōuhuà Pīnyīn Fāng'àn). It is referred to as the Canton Romanization on the LSHK character database. The system is not used in Hong Kong where romanization schemes such as Hong Kong Government, Yale, ILE and Jyutping are popular, though it can be seen in works released in the People's Republic of China regarding Cantonese.

== Teochew ==
The scheme for the Teochew dialect of Min Nan is outlined in "The Teochew Transliteration Scheme" (simplified Chinese: "潮州话拼音方案"; traditional Chinese: 潮州話拼音方案; pinyin: Cháozhōuhuà Pīnyīn Fāng'àn). This scheme (and another similar scheme which is based upon this scheme) is often referred to as Peng'im, which is the Teochew pronunciation of pinyin.

This scheme is the romanization scheme currently described in the Teochew dialect article.

== Hakka ==
The scheme for Hakka is outlined in "The Hakka Transliteration Scheme" (simplified Chinese: 客家话拼音方案; traditional Chinese: 客家話拼音方案; pinyin: Kèjiāhuà Pīnyīn Fāng'àn). The scheme describes the Meixian dialect, which is generally regarded as the de facto standard dialect of Hakka in mainland China.

== Hainanese ==
The scheme for Hainanese is outlined in the "Hainanese Transliteration Scheme" (simplified Chinese: 海南话拼音方案; traditional Chinese: 海南話拼音方案; pinyin: Hǎinánhuà Pīnyīn Fāng'àn). The scheme describes the Wenchang dialect, which is generally regarded as the prestige dialect of Hainanese in mainland China, used in provincial broadcasting.
