= Hainanese Transliteration Scheme =

The Hainanese Transliteration Scheme (Chinese: 海南話拼音方案) is a romanization scheme developed by the Guangdong Provincial Education Department in September 1960 as one of four systems collectively referred to as Guangdong Romanization. The scheme describes the Wenchang dialect spoken in Wenchang, Hainan which is considered to be the prestige dialect of Hainanese. At the time of the scheme's creation, Hainan was part of Guangdong, until it was separated to form its own province in 1988. This system utilises the Latin alphabet with superscript numbers to represent tone.

== System ==
=== Letters ===
This system uses the Latin alphabet, excluding the letters ⟨c⟩, ⟨f⟩, ⟨j⟩, ⟨k⟩, ⟨q⟩, ⟨r⟩, ⟨t⟩, ⟨w⟩ and ⟨x⟩.

=== Initials ===
Letter	Example	IPA
b	波	/ɓ/
p	坡	/f/
m	摩	/m/
v	无	/b/
d	装	/t/
dd	刀	/ɗ/
n	挪	/n/
l	罗	/l/
g	哥	/k/
gh	吳	/g/
ng	俄	/ŋ/
h	可	/h/
hh	号	/ɦ/
z	支	/ts/
s	妻	/s/
y	余	/dz/

=== Finals ===
Letter(s)	Example	IPA
i	医	i
u	呜	u
a	亚	a
ia	也	ia
ua	换	ua
o	哦	o
io	喲	io
e	下	e
ue	话	ue
ai	哀	ai
uai	坏	uai
oi	鞋	oi
ui	貴	ui
ao	喉	au
iao	妖	iau
ou	烏	ou
iu	柚	iu
am	暗	am
iam	厌	iam
im	⾳	im
an	安	an
uan	弯	uan
in	烟	in
un	温	un
ang	红	aŋ
iang	央	iaŋ
uang	汪	uaŋ
eng	英	eŋ
ong	翁	oŋ
iong	匈	ioŋ
ab	盒	ap
iab	协	iap
ib	邑	iop
ad	遏	at
uad	挖	uat
id	乙	it
ud	核	ut
ag	鹤	ak
iag	菊	iak
uag	廓	uak
eg	益	ok
og	喔	ok
iog	育	iok

=== Tones ===
Tone class	陰平	陽平	上聲	陰去	陽去	陰入	陰入	陽入
Tone number	1	2	3	4	5	6	7	8
Example	诗 di^{1}	时 di^{2}	死 di^{3}	四 di^{4}	是 di^{5}	视 di^{6}	失 did^{7}	实 did^{8}
Tone contour	˨˦ (24)	˨˩ (21)	˨˩˩ (211)	˧˥ (35)	˧ (33)	˥ (5)	˧ (3)	˥ (55)

== See also ==
- Guangdong romanization
- Hainanese
