= Hainan people =

Natives of Hainan, China

海南人 (Hái-nâm-nâng)

Total population
- 6 million+ worldwide (Hainan Min speakers and their descendants only)

Regions with significant populations
- Hainan, Hong Kong, Southeast Asia (Thailand, Vietnam, Cambodia, Brunei, Singapore, Malaysia and Indonesia), British Isles, Oceania, Americas

Languages
- lingua franca: Hainanese and Standard Chinese others: Hlai, Jiamao, Lingao, Kim Mun, Tsat, Danzhou dialect and various other languages of the countries that they inhabit as a part of the Overseas Chinese diaspora

Religion
- Atheism, Confucianism, Taoism, Buddhism, Christianity, etc.

Related ethnic groups
- Putian, Cantonese, Tanka, Hlai, etc.

Hainan people, also called Hainam people (Chinese: 海南人 or 海南儂; HTS: Hhai^{3}nam^{2}nang^{2}; BOT: Hái-nâm-nâng) or Hainanese people, are the residents of Hainan, China's southernmost and smallest province. The term Hainanese refers to all residents of the island or, more specifically, to the Min-speaking Han Chinese sub-ethnic group native to the area. Hainam Min speakers are sometimes referred to as Qiongzhou people (Chinese: 琼州人/瓊州人) to distinguish them from other groups of Hainan such as the Cantonese, Tanka, Hlai, and Miao.

Han Hainanese people, who today form the majority population of the island, trace their origins to Han colonists and exiles from Fujian and Guangdong provinces. By and large, they were not voluntary colonists, but were acting on government orders to populate the sparsely populated peninsula and island. By contrast, the Lingaoese, Hlai, and Tanka migrated to the island much earlier and are regarded as part of the Nanyue or Baiyue peoples.

Beginning in the Song dynasty, Han colonists from northeastern Fujian started settling on the Leizhou Peninsula and Hainan island. This displaced indigenous Nanyue groups, such as the Hlai, who then moved into mountain areas.

A genetic study revealed Hainam Han genetically cluster most closely with Guangxi and Guangdong Han Chinese. A genetic study based on Haikou Han (Boat Dwellers, new immigrants, etc.) claimed that Haikou samples cluster most closely with Chinese Singaporeans and Han Taiwanese.

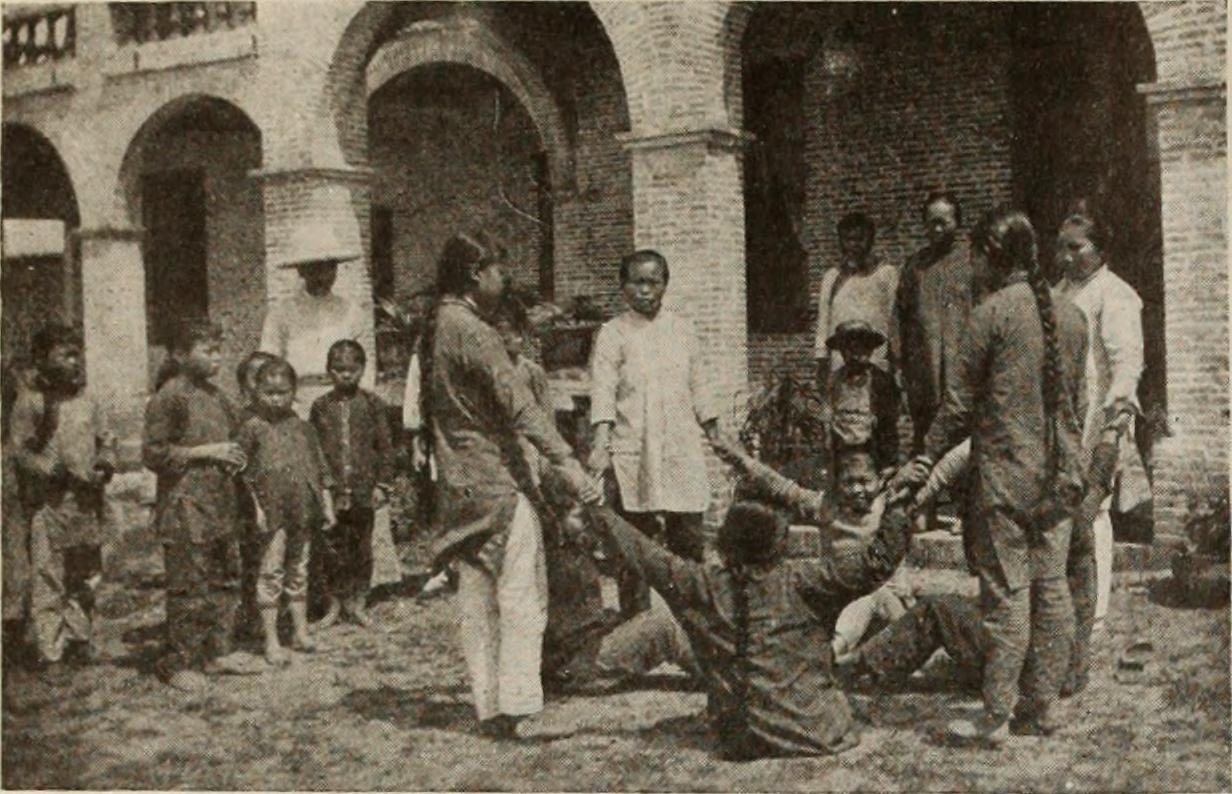
Hainan students playing

Like Fujian and Guangdong provinces, Hainan has been a source for emigration. Towards the turn of the 20th century, many Hainanese migrated to various Southeast Asian nations, where they worked as cooks, restaurateurs, coffee shop owners, clothes makers, sailors and hoteliers, filling niches left unoccupied by previous groups of immigrants from China. The Hainanese were particularly successful in Thailand, there are 2 million Hainanese in Thailand. as well as large number of tycoons trace Hainanese origin, and in Cambodia, where they controlled the hotel and restaurant trade. They also formed a substantial proportion of Chinese communities in Vietnam, Indonesia, Laos, Singapore and Malaysia. The outbreak of war with Japan prompted the departures of 33,000 persons in 1936 and 44,000 in 1937 from Hainan.

Overseas Hainanese have been a significant and particularly active source of remittances to China. This was done through specialized banks called "letter offices" (55 such banks were counted in 1937). The donations of overseas Hainanese helped to build schools, libraries and hospitals not just in their ancestral towns and villages, but also in Haikou, the provincial capital. Overseas Hainanese introduced rubber, pepper, pineapple, cocoa, palm oil and lemon grass to Hainan Island and ensured its commercial production there.

Main cities of Hainan island

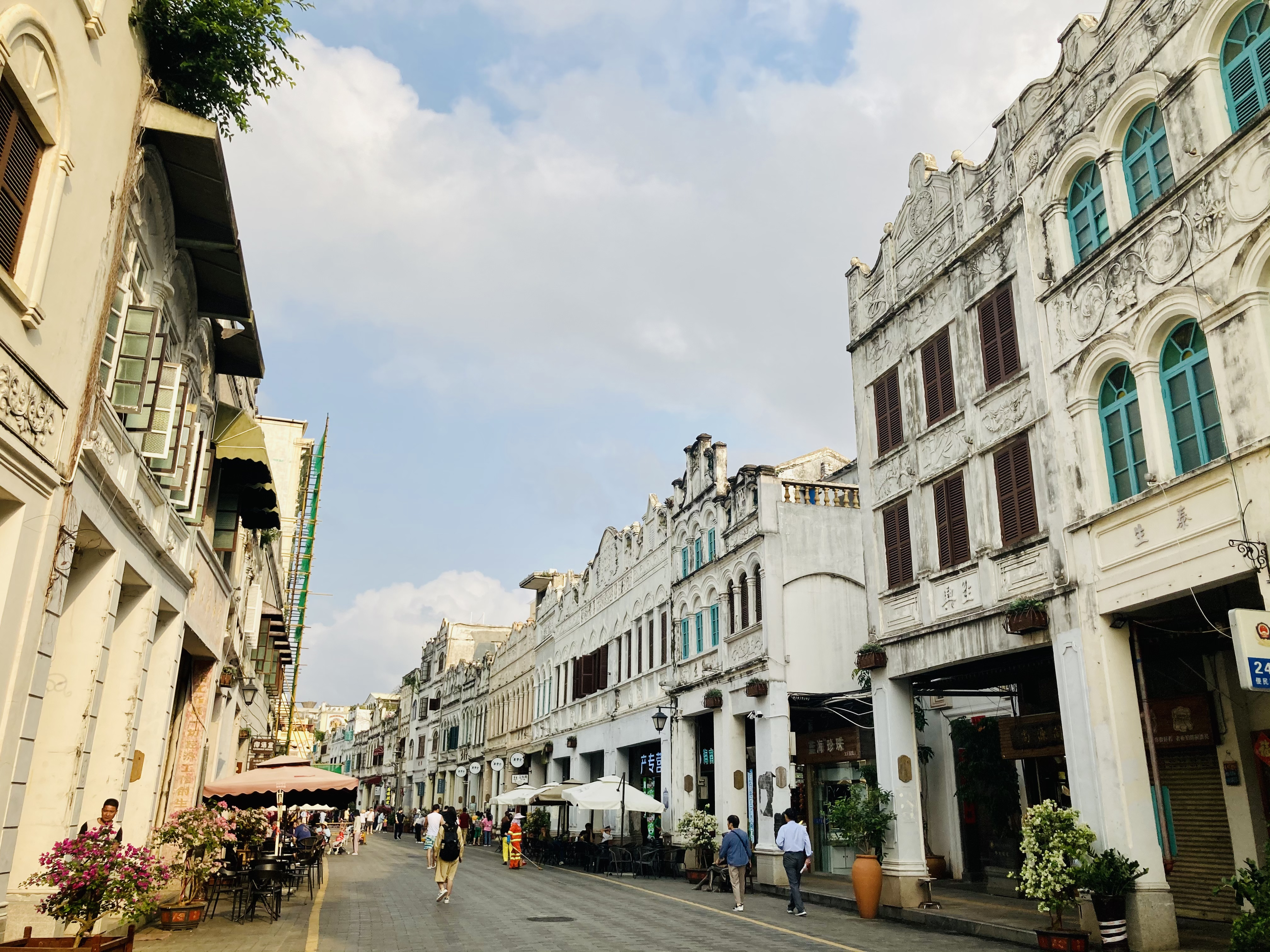
Haikou city, photo of old Haikou

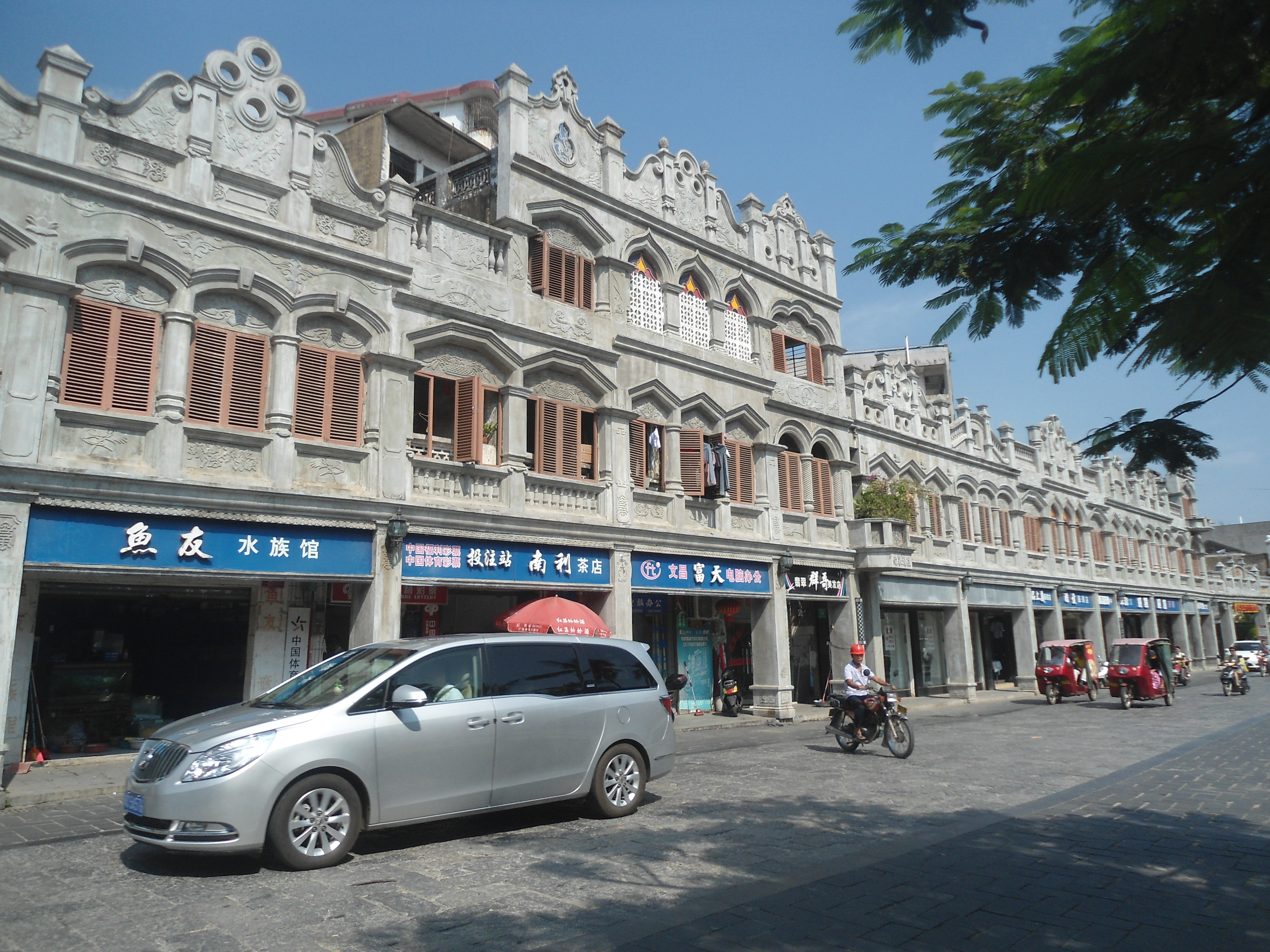
Wenchang city, photo of old Wenchang

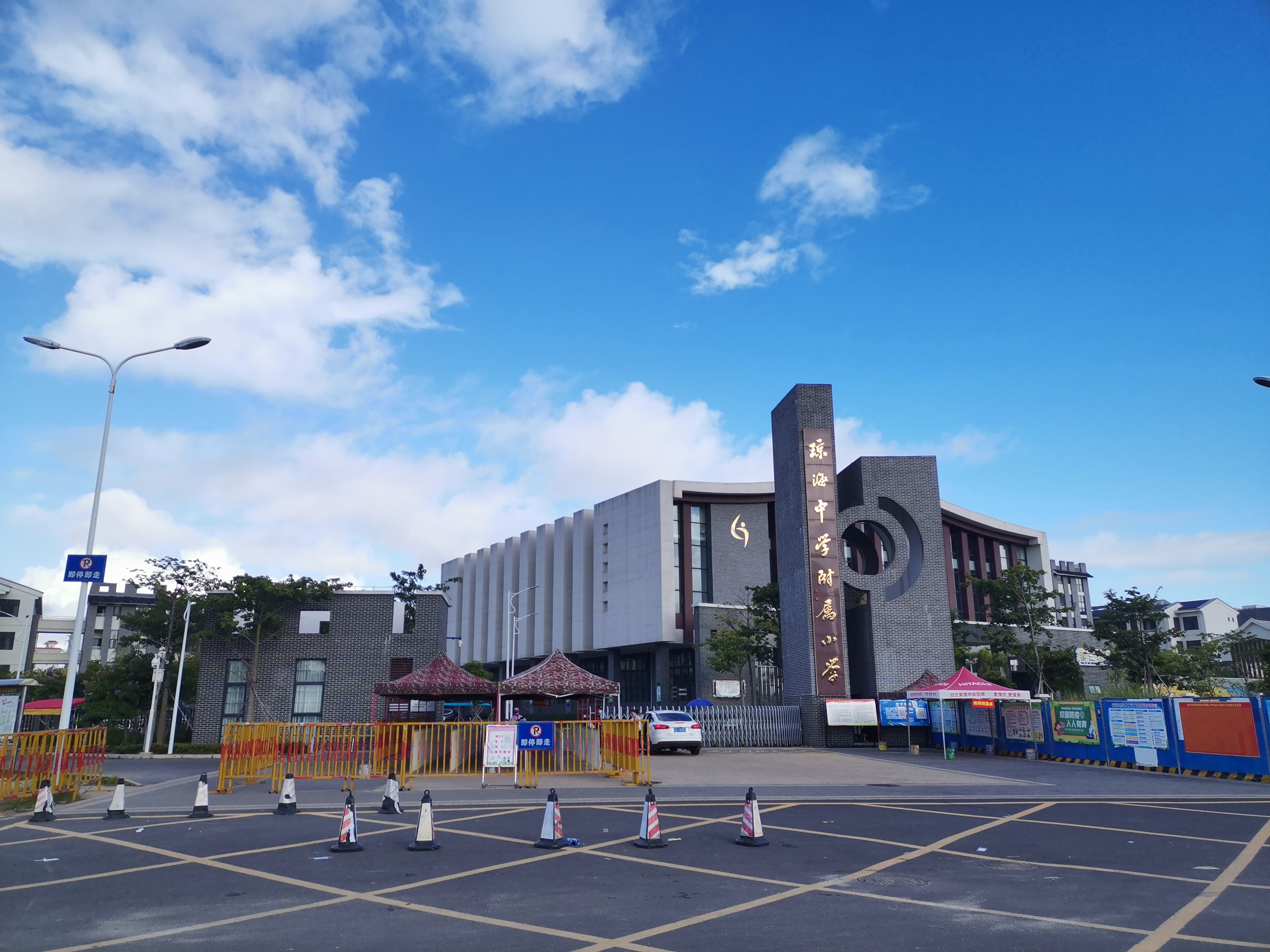
Kachek city

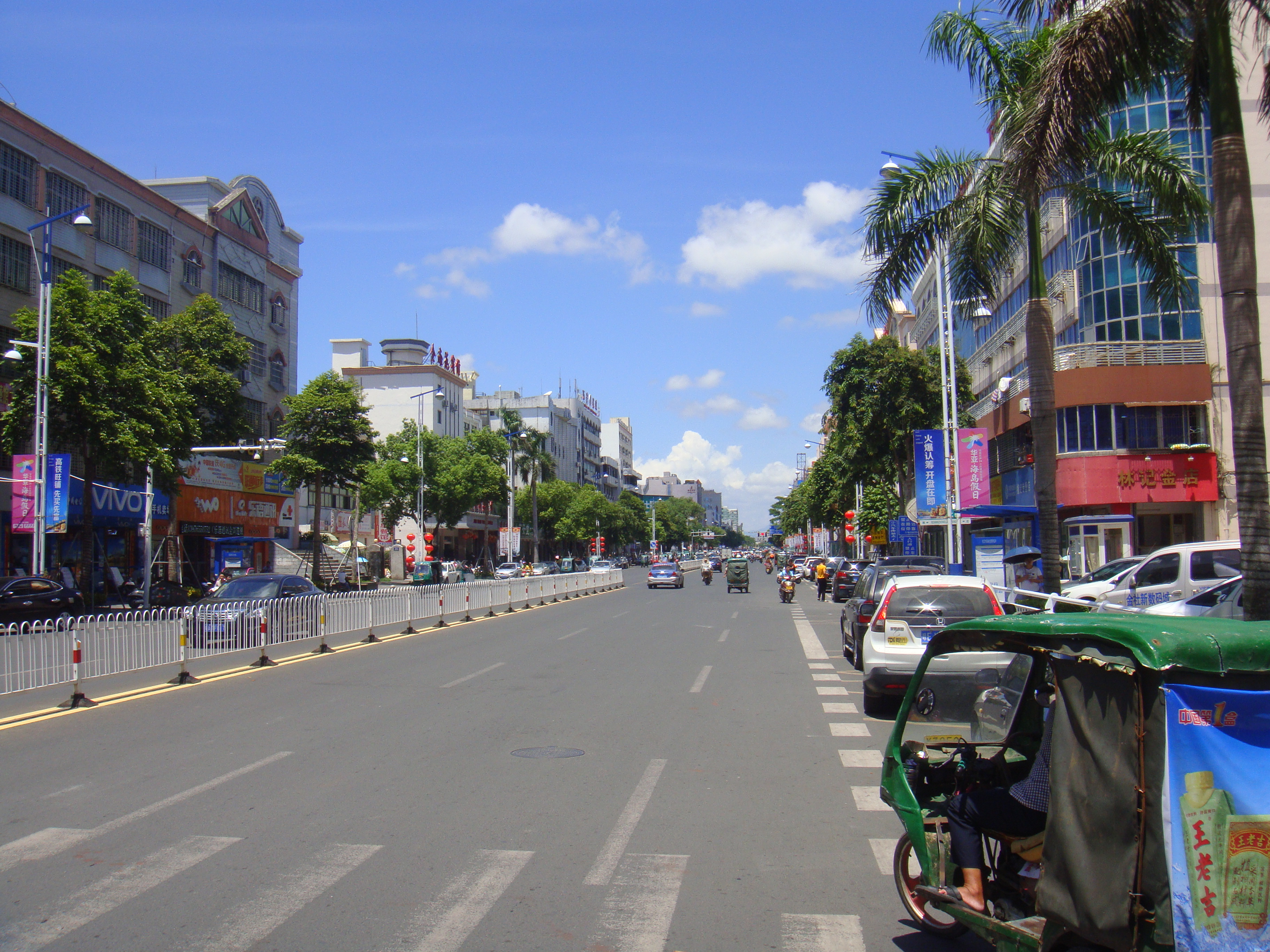
Wanning city

Hainanese assembly halls outside of China

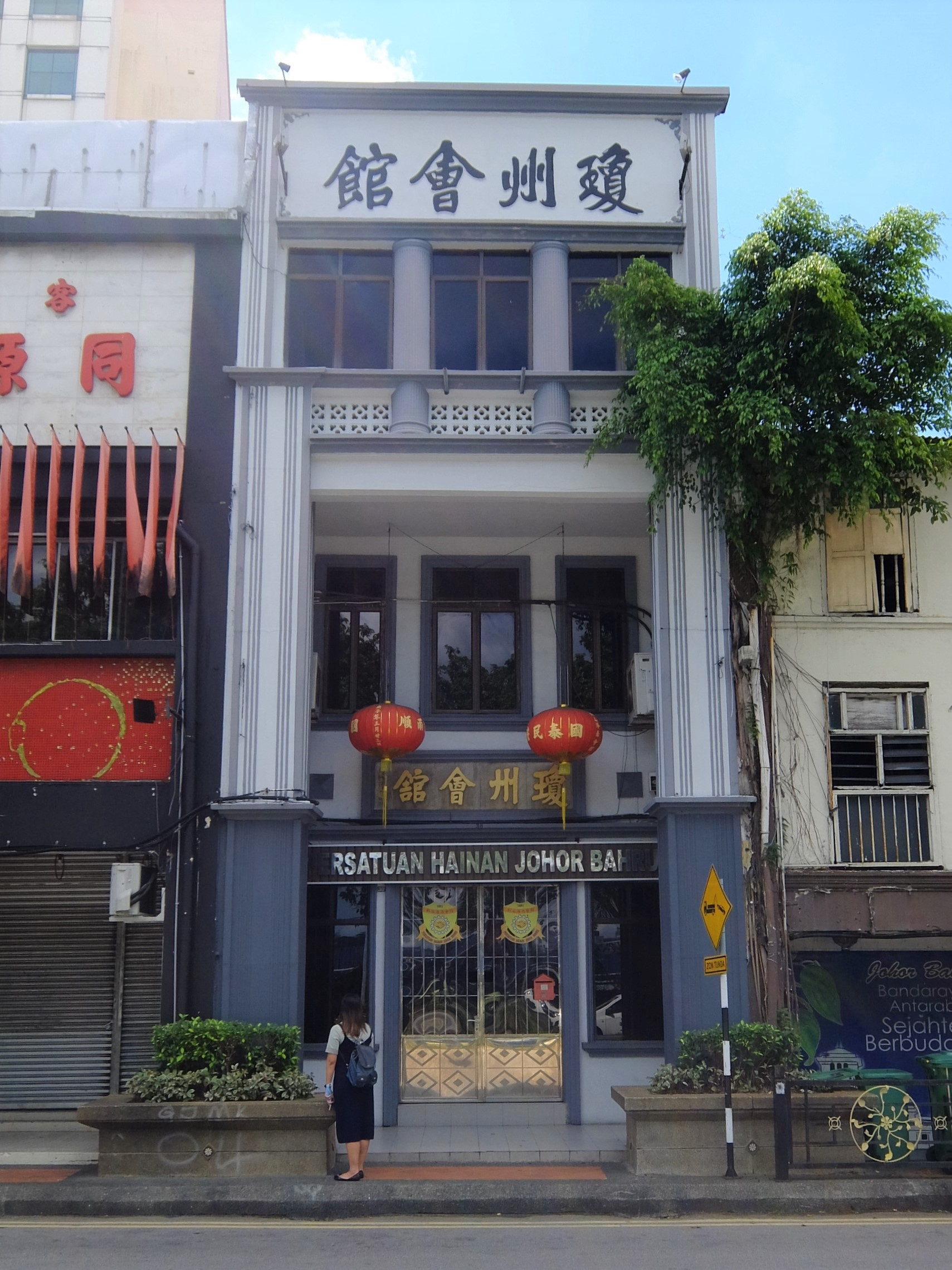
Hainanese assembly hall in Johor Bahru

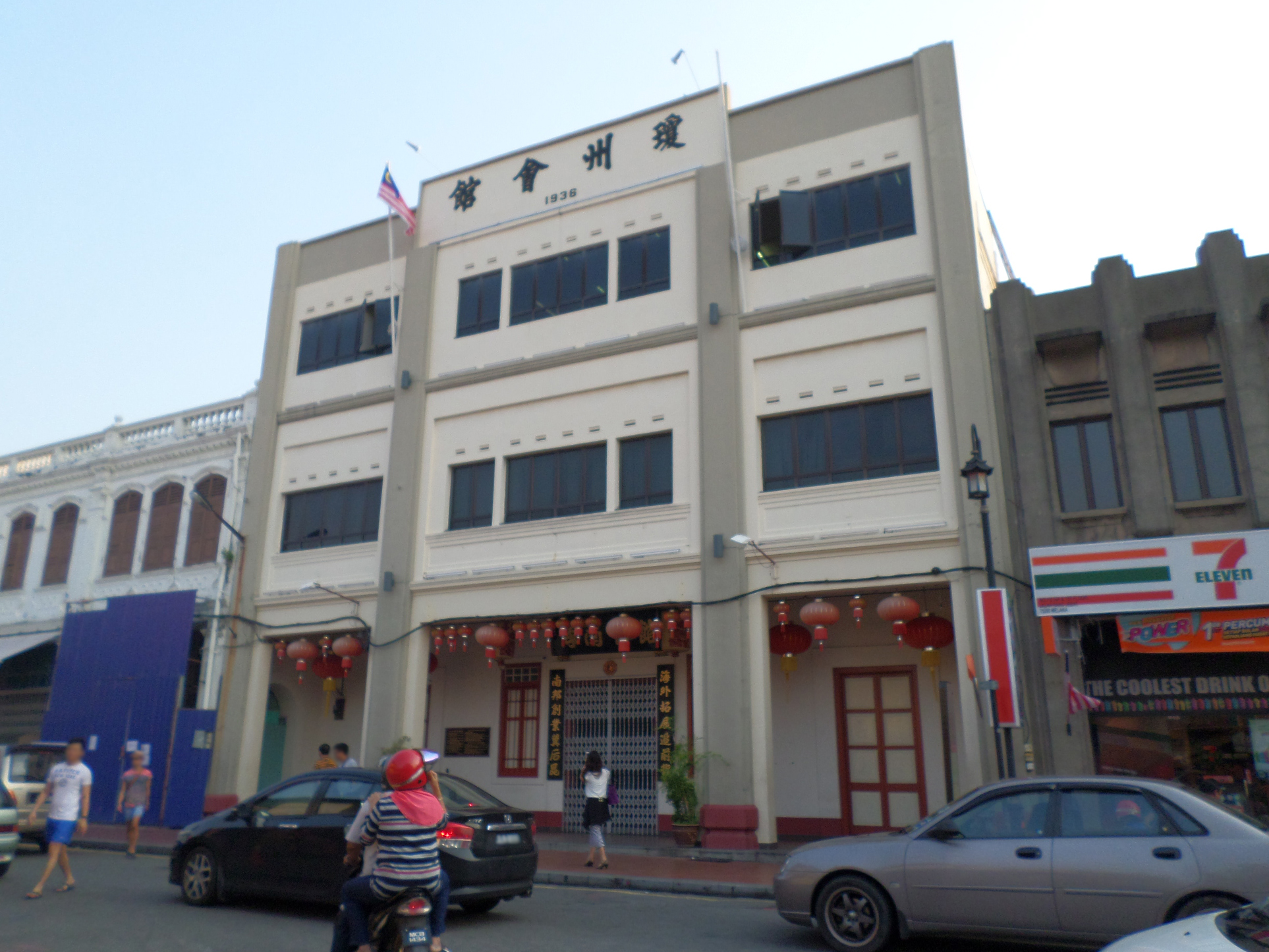
Hainanese assembly hall in Malacca

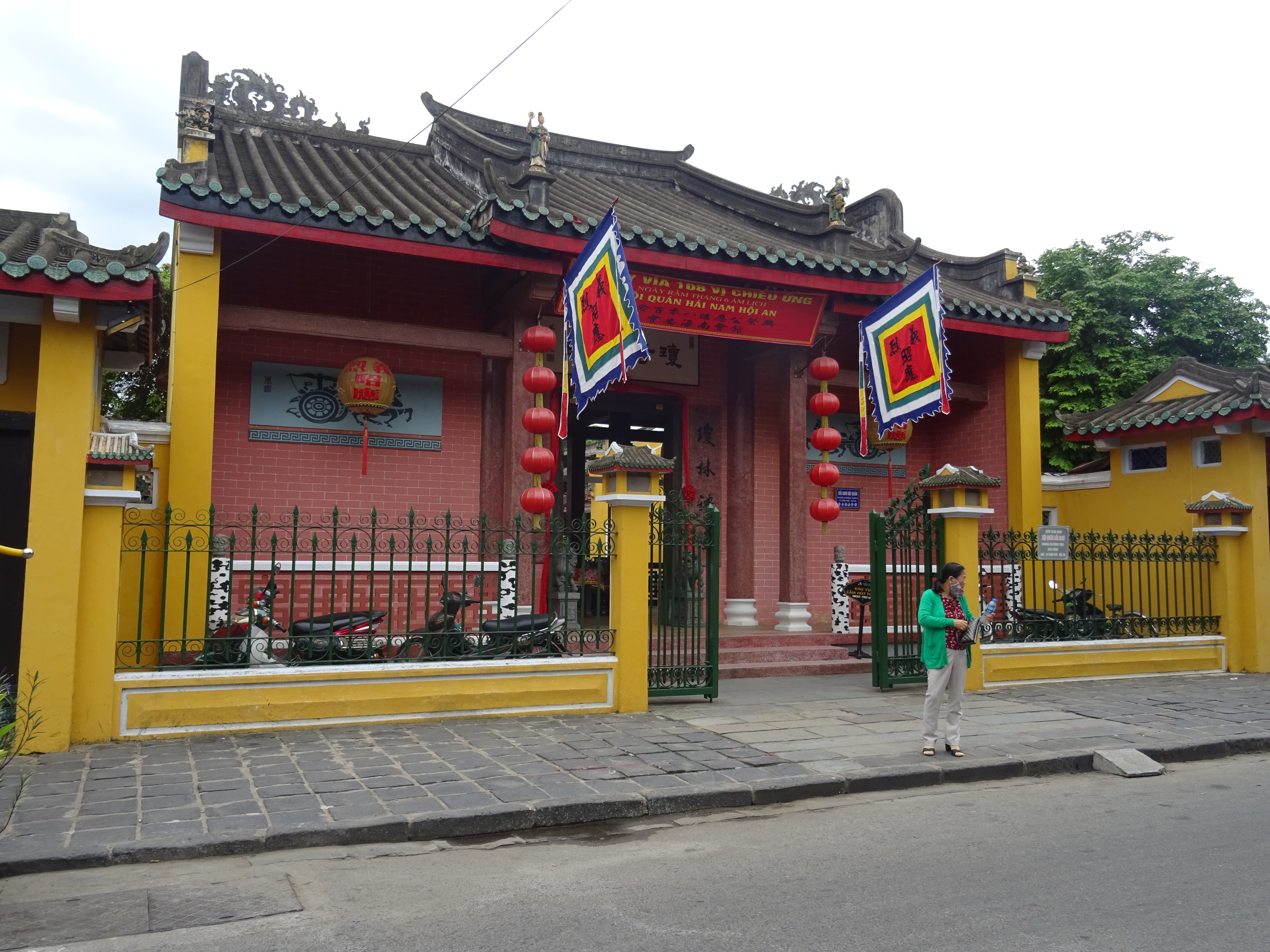
Hainanese assembly hall in Hoi An, Vietnam

== Genetics ==
According to an analysis of autosomal loci using the Huaxia platinum system, the unspecified Han at Haikou (Boat Dwellers, etc.) grouped together with geographically close Taiwan Han, even while showing subtle differentiation from other Han populations. According to an article published in the European Journal of Genetics on 2 March 2020, the Hainanese Han cluster first with the Singapore Chinese and the Minnan Han population, followed by the Cantonese population. The same article states that unsepcified Han at Haikou city like Boat Dwellers showed a compared with the wider Han population with an average pairwise FST of 0.002.

Hainanese Han represent the southernmost branch of the different Han Chinese subgroups. Although there was a Han presence as early as during the Han dynasty, Han settlers began to immigrate to the island in significant numbers only after the fall of the Northern Song dynasty. At this time, the island was considered a remote garrison and a place of exile. More Han colonists migrated throughout the 16th and 17th centuries.

== History ==
=== Garrison and prison island for exiles and political criminals ===
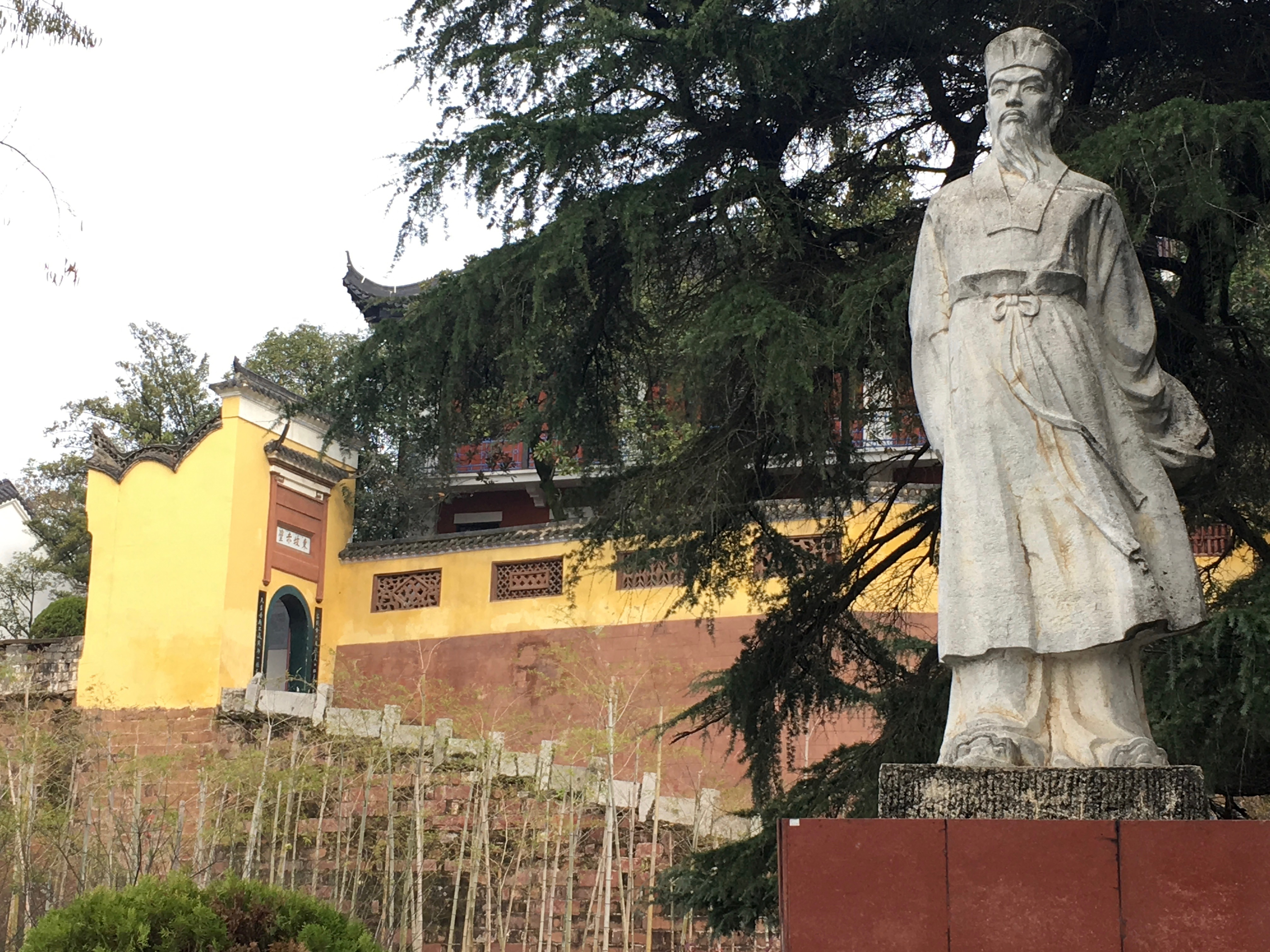
Su Dong Po, famous essayist, statesman and calligrapher

Hainan's Danzhou was traditionally regarded as a malaria-infested backwater and unfit for human habitation and was therefore used as a place of exile, and not the tropical paradise it is considered to be today. It acquired a reputation as a place of exile for political prisoners, fallen ministers and literati, the most notable of whom was Su Dong Po, who made funeral preparations prior to his relocation to Hainan. When he arrived, Su Dong Po expressed dismay at the hardscrabble living conditions and dietary practices of fellow Han Chinese he found stationed on the island and is credited for introducing improvements to the lifestyle of the inhabitants.

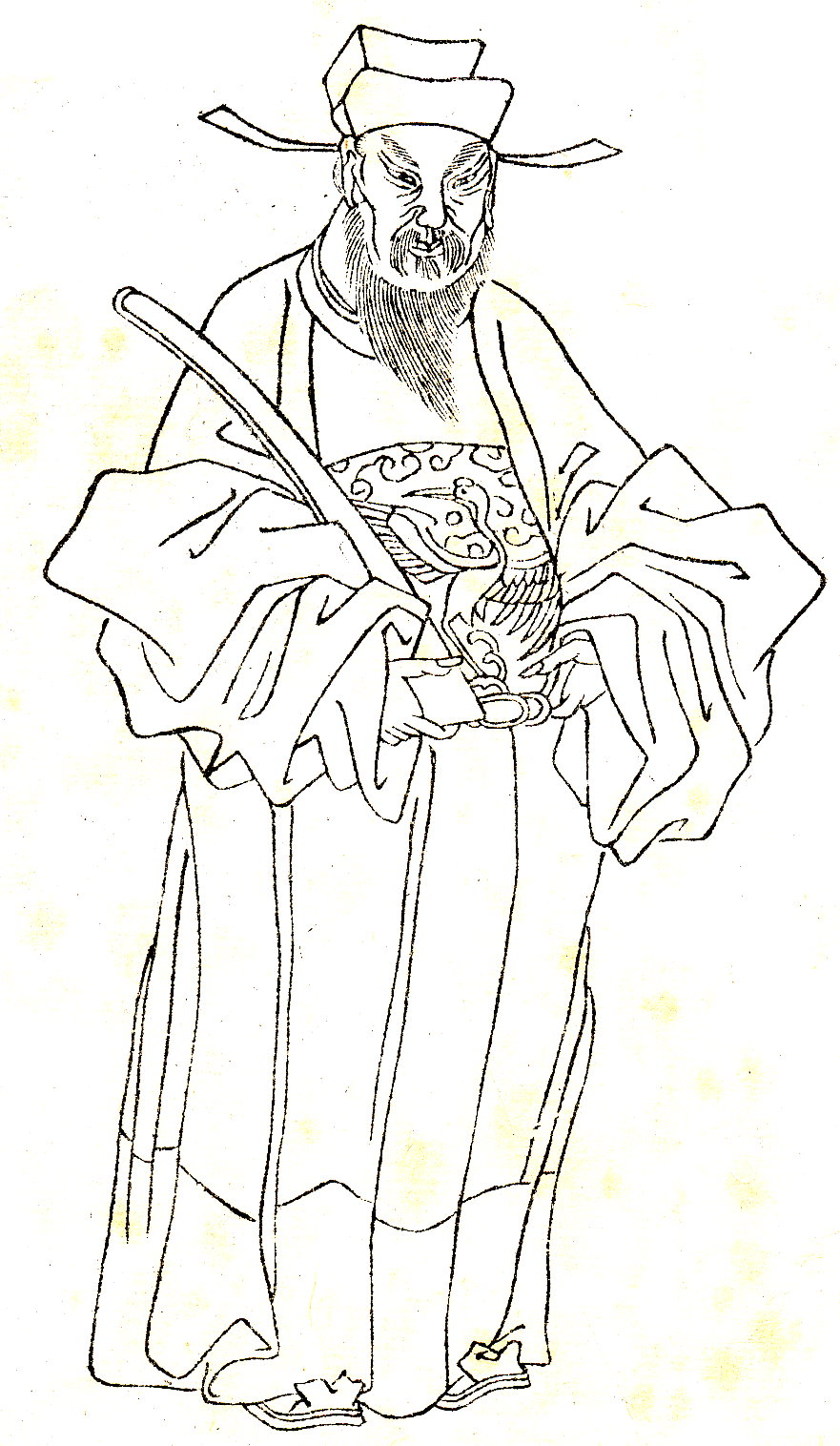
Li Gang, Song-dynasty chancellor

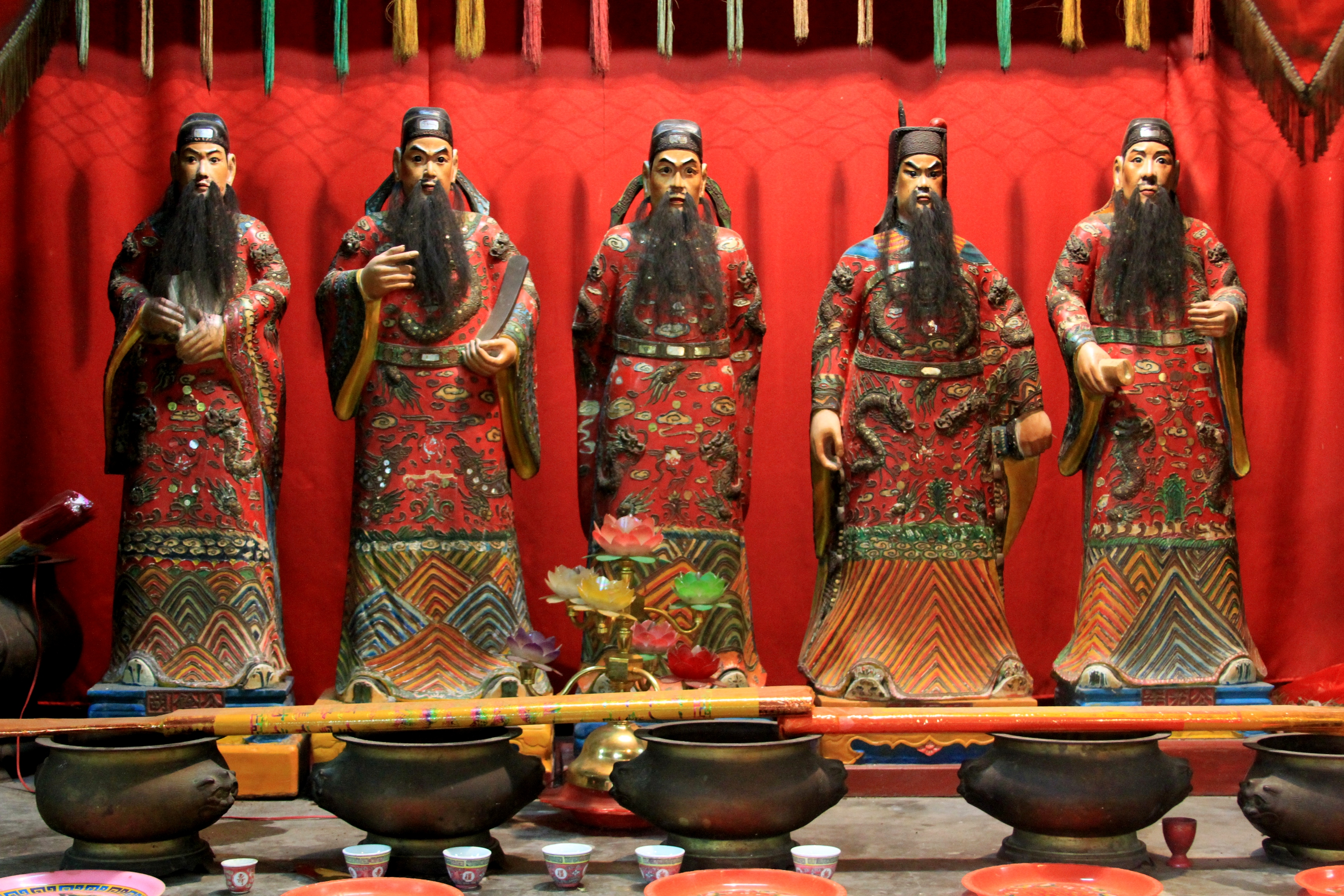
Effigies of the Five Lords (famous officials who were banished to Hainan island) commemorated in Haikou

Other important figures included Li Gang, the Chancellor of the Song dynasty, who belonged to a pro-war faction of the Song court. During the political purges that followed the fall of Jingkang in 1127 AD, the factional infighting between ministerial factions came to a head, and it was during this period that Hainan acquired a reputation as a place for exiled literati and political opponents.

It was during this tumultuous period that Han immigration from southern mainland China to Hainan Island intensified and during which the island became known as a place for banished ministers and statesmen.

In characterizing the Hainanese, Benjamin Couch observes: "the early settlers were exiles, banished from their homelands, to which they ever hoped to return. They were not voluntary colonists, nor were they all criminals and outlaws, but the vassals of a despotic government, who obeying the orders of the emperor, left their homes in the more congenial region about Fukien [Fujian], to occupy and develop the sparsely peopled territory south of the sea."

=== Han–minority relations ===
==== Relationship between Han colonists and aboriginal Li peoples ====
Han Chinese presence on Hainan Island led to friction with indigenous Li peoples (a Tai-Kradai group related to the Lao of Siam and Laos) from the beginning. After its incorporation into China during the Han dynasty in 110 BC, Han colonisation was fairly constant throughout the following two millennia, especially from Putian city of central Fujian and from Guangdong. The Li resisted Sinicization more fiercely than the indigenous Taiwanese and they were ultimately defeated and driven into the mountainous areas of central and southwest Hainan. They subsisted by engaging in barter trade with the Han Chinese, who had settled on Hainan's coastal regions, trading in mountain produce.

The aboriginal Li women were known to practice a form of sorcery that involved keeping specters in subjection. This art was transmitted by their ancestors. It is reported that the art was so secretive that the Li witches would rather be beaten to death by magistrates than to betray one another. These specters would be used to kill enemies and had a great effect among the Li people themselves. According to Han Chinese records, these spells seemed to work only on Li but had no effect on the Han Chinese of the island whatsoever.

==== Imported Miao tribes ====
Han Chinese colonists and Han Chinese Hakka immigrants on Hainan Island faced regular attacks from Li aboriginal peoples, who resisted Sinicization. In order to protect the Han Chinese population on the island, Chinese kings regularly deported "successive detachments of mountaineers" from Guangxi and Guizhou known as the Miao to protect Han Chinese colonists. The Miao tribesmen were tasked with warding off attacks by Li aborigines on the Han Chinese, and to act as mediators between the Han and Li peoples.

==== Han Chinese genealogical traditions ====
Genealogical studies of zupu (clan genealogies) indicate that numerous Hainanese descended from jinshi (metropolitan scholars) and merchants and colonists from Putian city.

== Notable people ==
- Thanom Kittikachorn: Chief Minister of Siam
- Pote Sarasin: Chief Minister of Siam
- Boonchu Rojanastien (黃聞波): President of Bank of Bangkok
- Chaleo Yoovidhya (許書標): billionaire creator of Red Bull
- Somsavat Lengsavad (凌绪光): deputy prime minister of Laos
- Ngiam Tong Dow (嚴崇濤): CEO of DBS
- Lawrence Wong (黄循财): Prime Minister of Singapore
- Lee Chiaw Meng (李昭铭): Minister of Science and Technology
- Mah Bow Tan (马宝山): Minister of National Development
- Cedric Foo (符致鏡): Minister of State for National Development
- Chin Harn Tong (钱翰琮): mp
- Jason Leong: comedian
- Pang Chin Hin: founder of popular snack brand Mamee.

Politicians

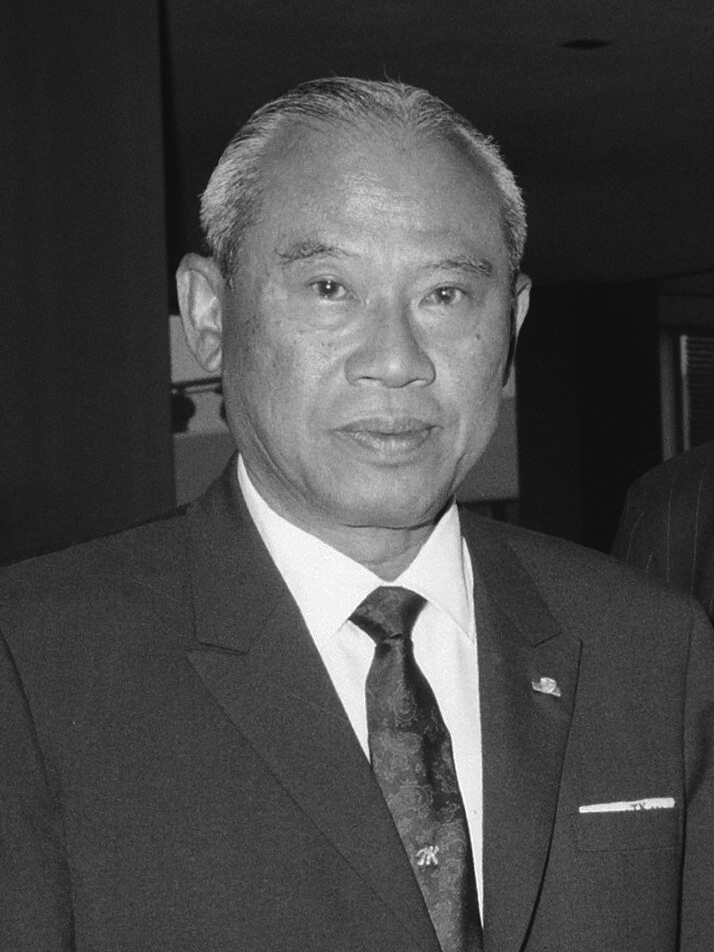
Prime Minister Thanom, Prime Minister of Thailand, of Hainam Henghua ancestry

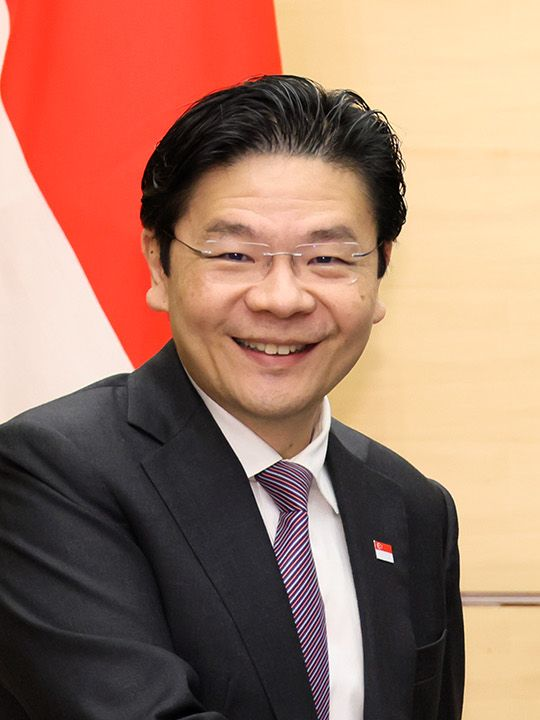
Lawrence Wong, Singapore PM, Hainam Henghua ancestry

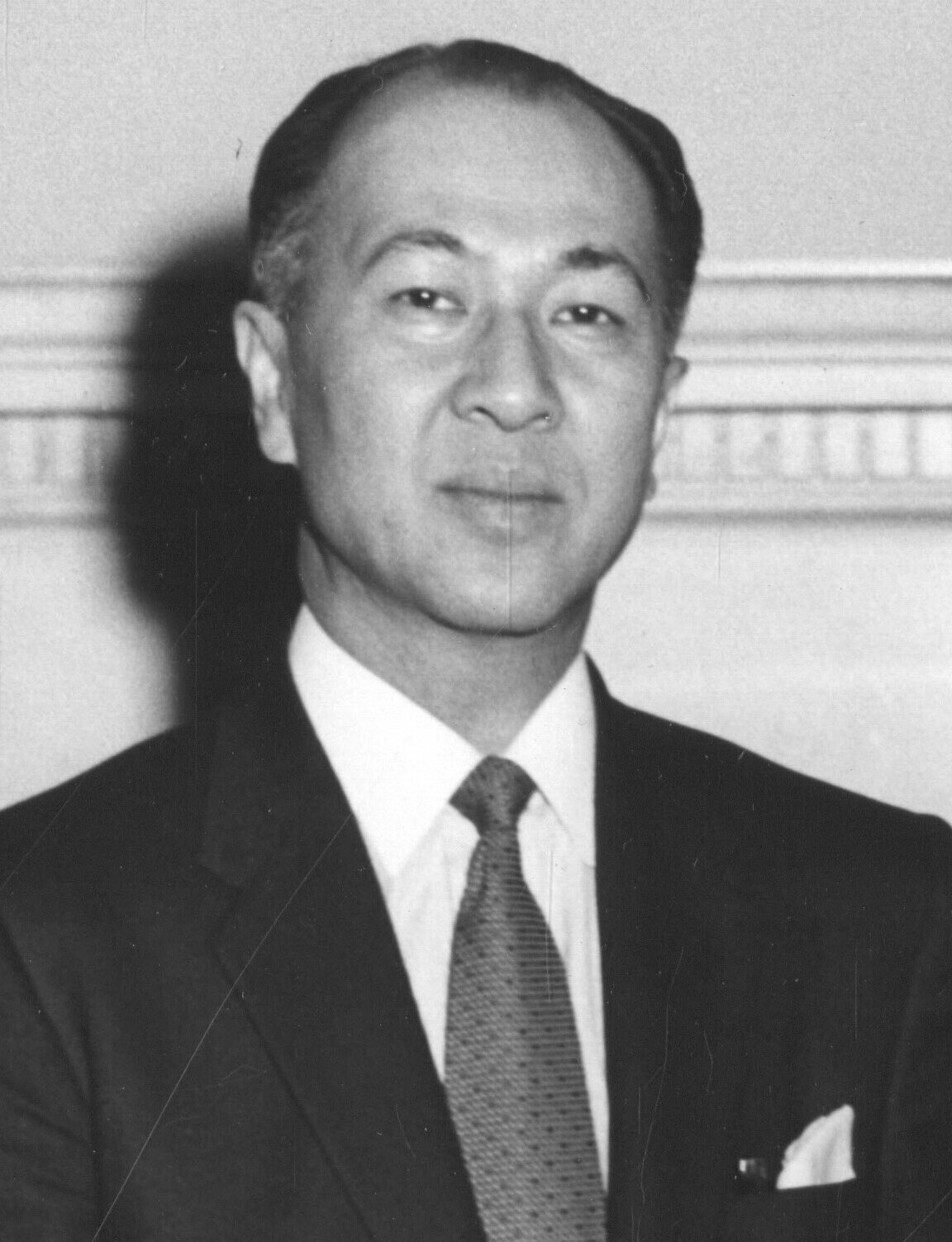
Prime Minister Pote Sarasin, Prime Minister of Thailand, of Hainam Henghua ancestry

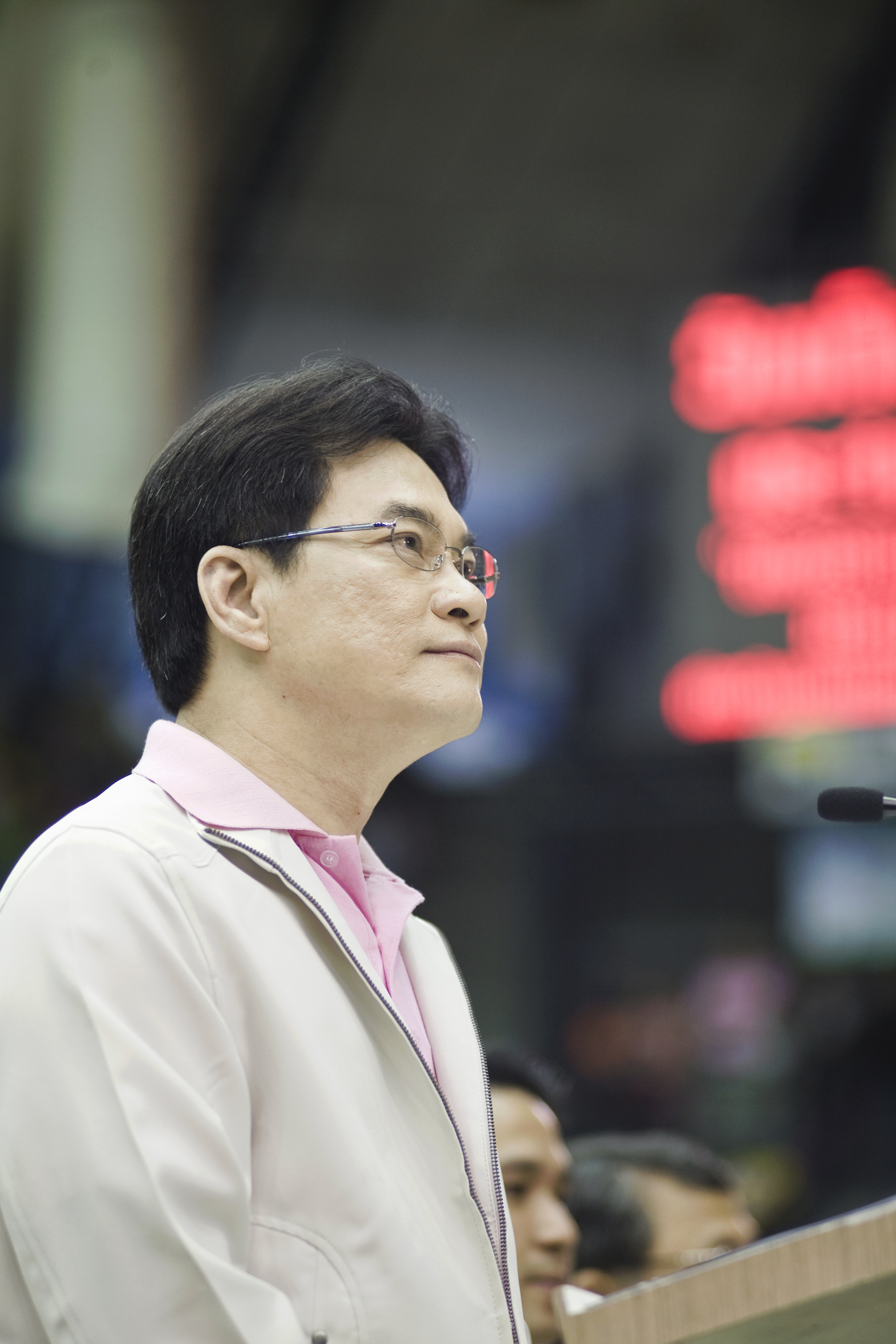
Jurin Laksanawisit, former Thai Minister of Education, of Hainanese ancestry

Entertainers

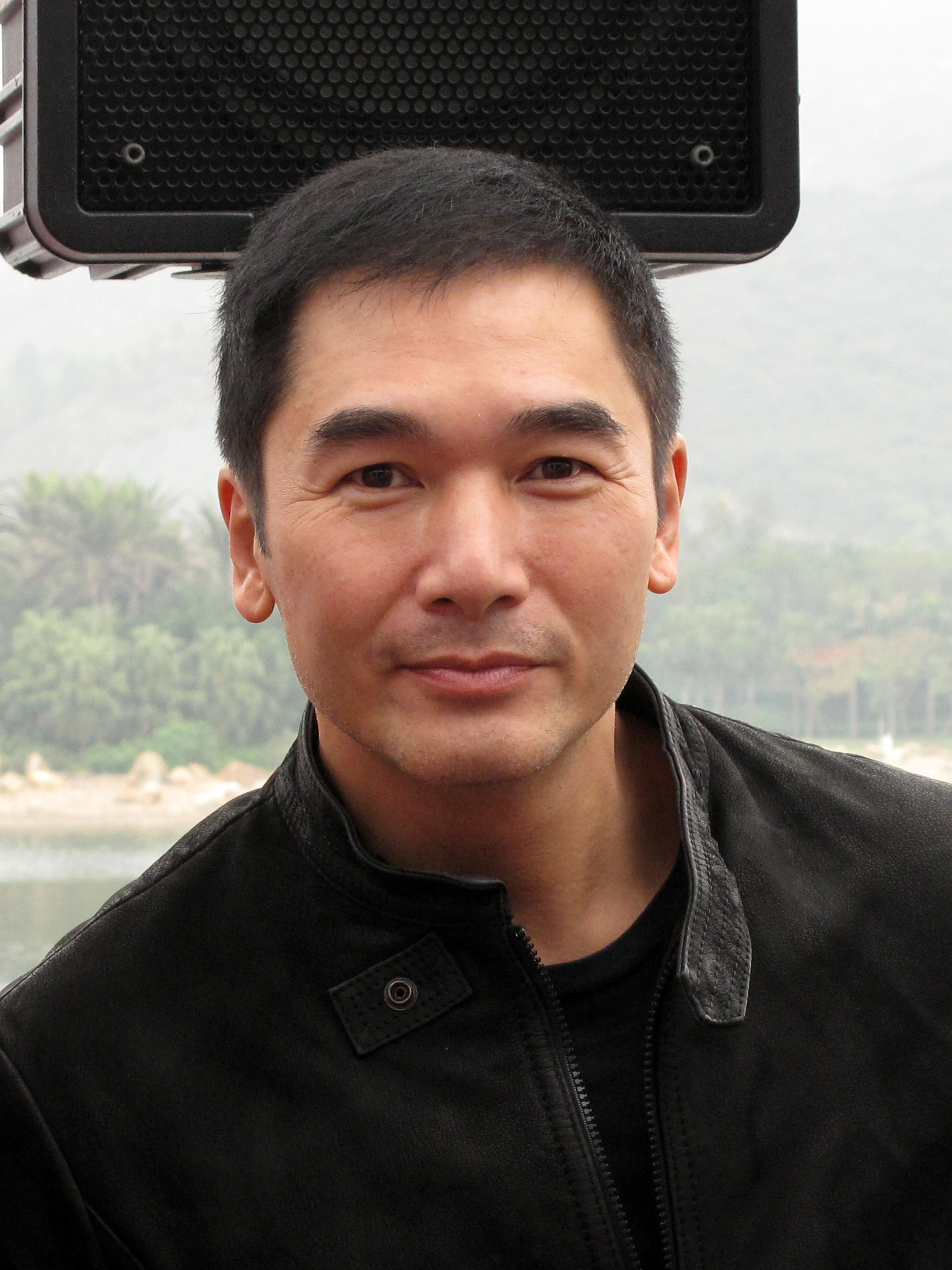
Alex Fong Chung Sun, Hong Kong actor of Hainanese Han ancestry

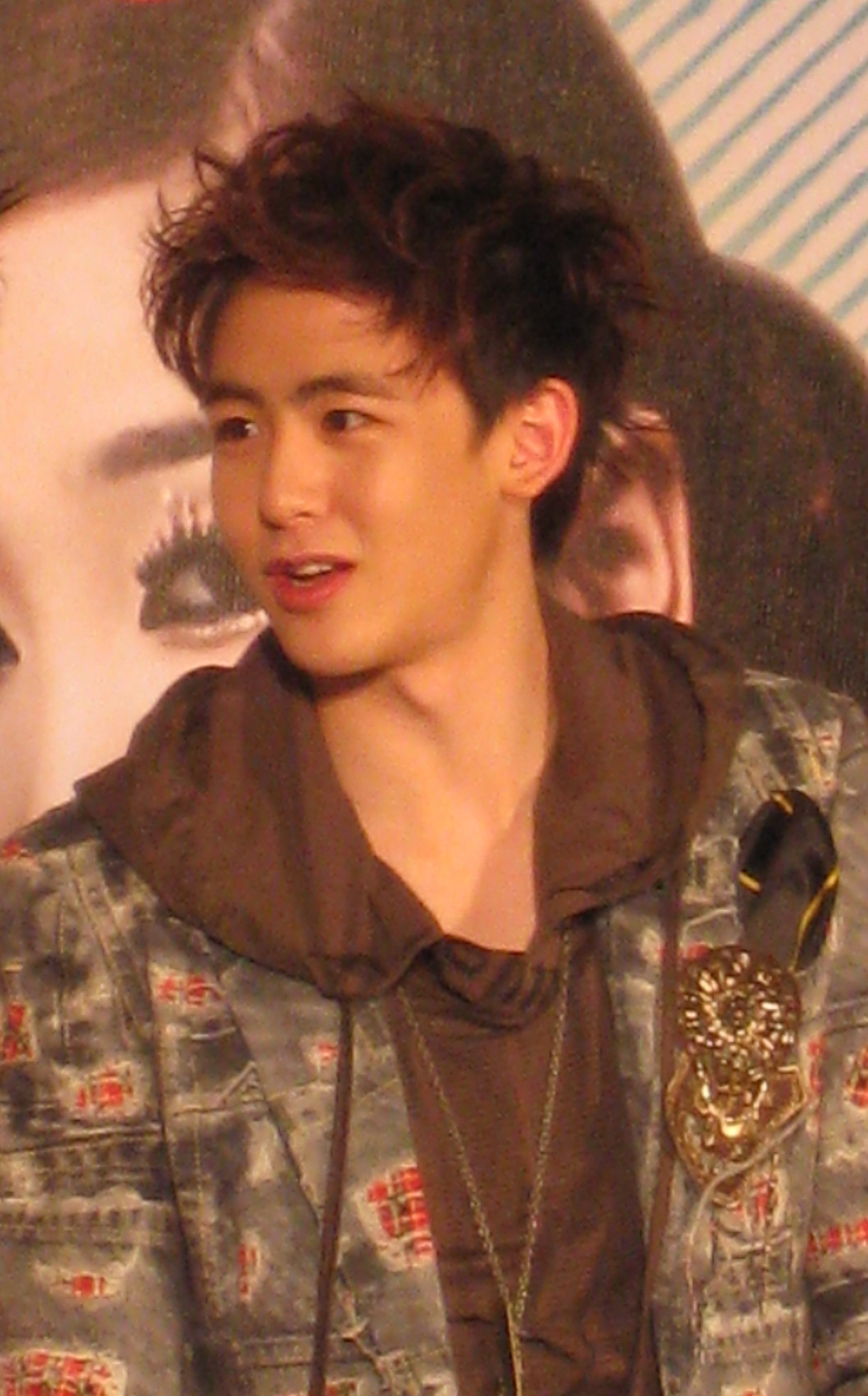
Thai singer Nichkhun of 2PM

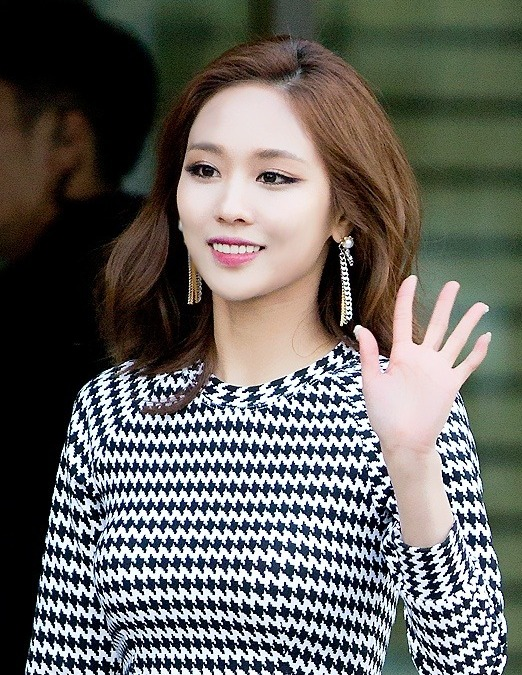
_{Wang Fei Fei, famous singer and Kpop star, is of Hainanese origin}

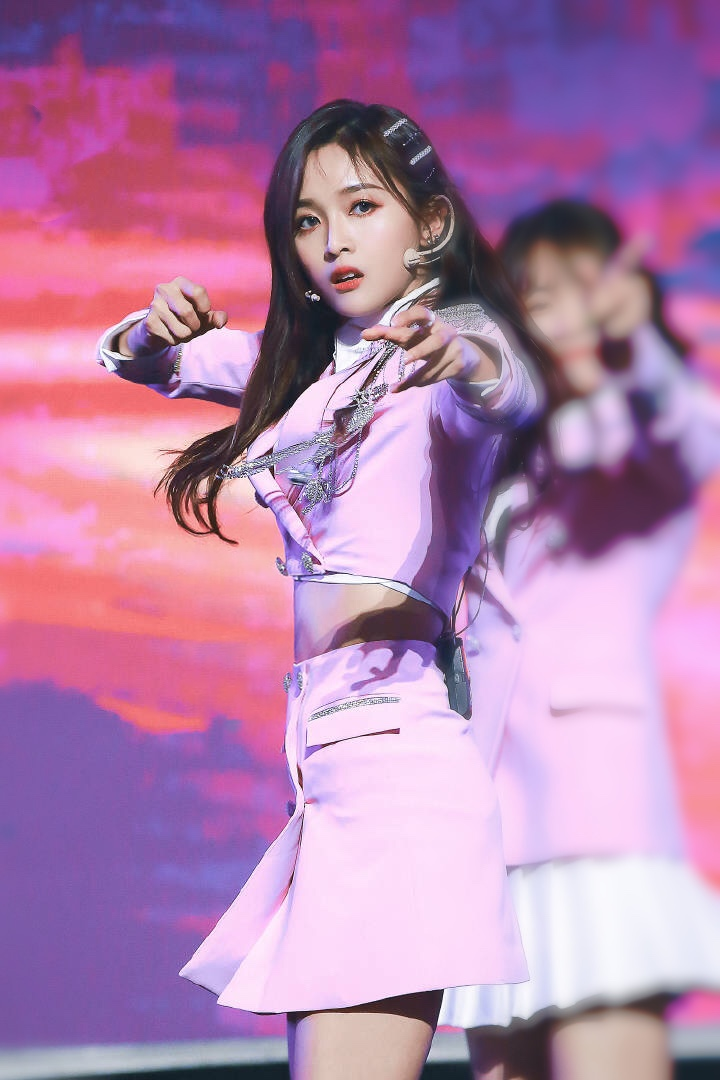
Wu Xuanyi, a famous Kpop star, is of Hainanese Han origin.

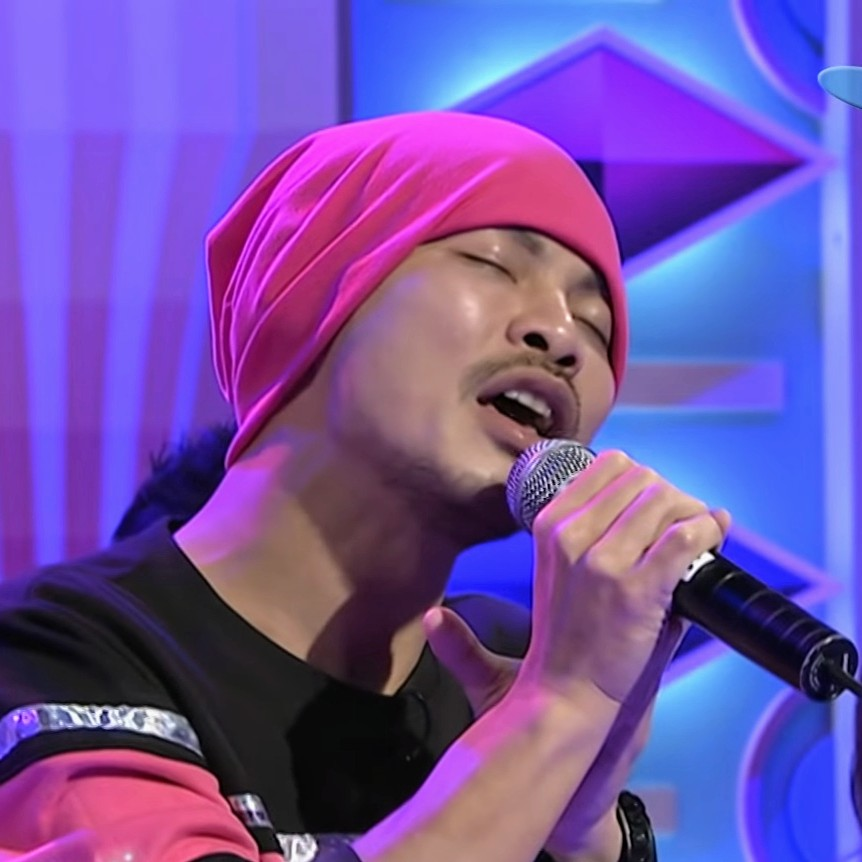
Namewee, Malaysian rapper and hip-hop artist.

Businesspersons

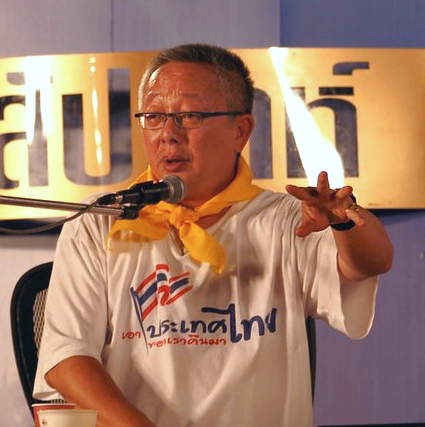
Sondhi Limthongkul, Thai businessperson of Hainanese ancestry

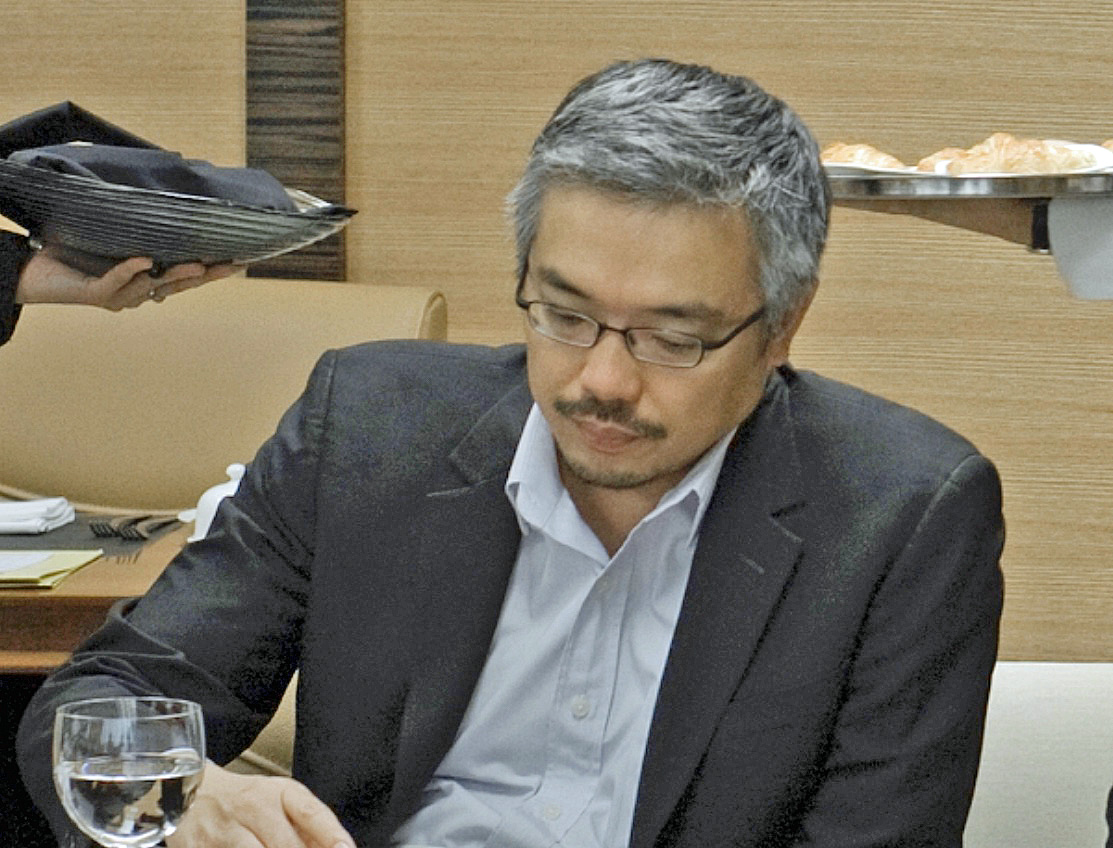
Tos Chirathivat, Thai businessperson of Hainanese Han ancestry

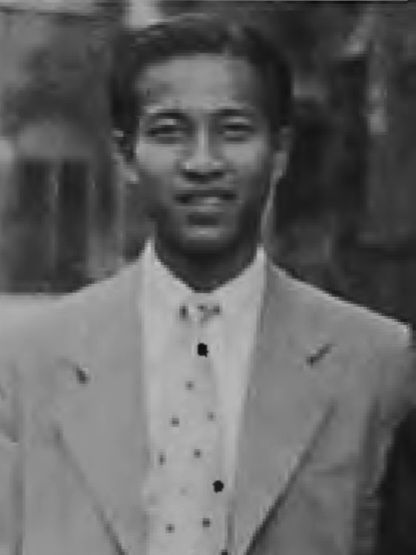
Pong Sarasin, Thai businessperson and politician, of Hainanese Han ancestry

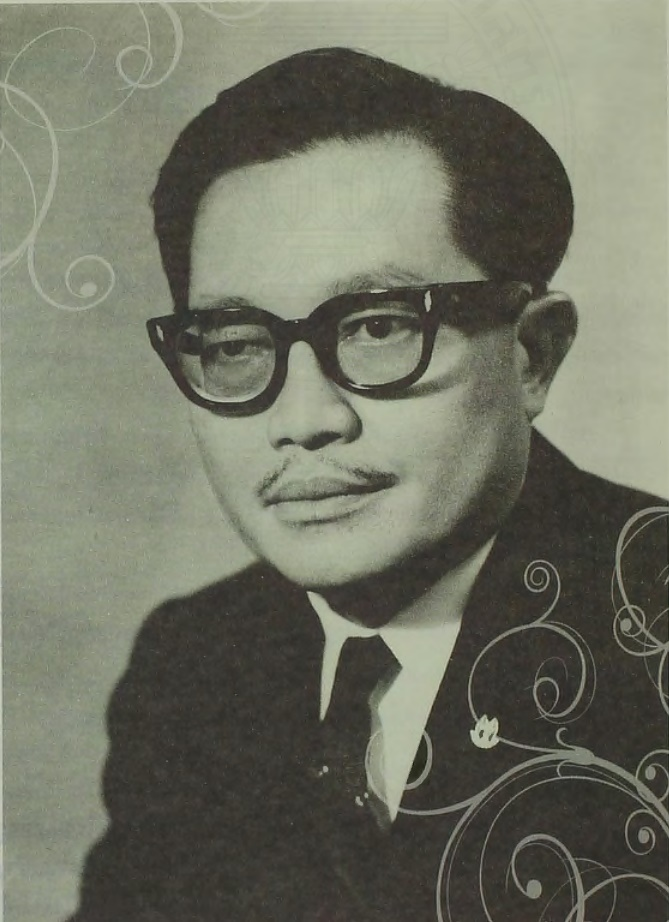
Boonchu Rojanastien, Thai banker and businessperson, of Hainanese origin

== Culture ==
=== Identity ===
The administration of the island was handled by Guangdong for most of its history, and investment in infrastructure was negligible during the imperial era. Hainanese are conscious of their distance from the mainland and mainstream China, and sensitive to the historical perception of the island as a remote and barbaric backwater, a place of exile for criminals and political malcontents. In reply, the Hainanese like to emphasize their cultural achievements at the highest, most elite level of the notoriously brutal Imperial examinations. There have been 105 successful jinshi degree holders from Hainan during its 1,300 years of imperial history, a rate that is five times higher than the national average.

=== Language ===
Min dialect map

==== Classification ====
In Hainan, the lingua franca and language of prestige is referred to as Hainanese. Hainanese is a southern Min language, in the same family of Chinese languages or dialects such as Hokkien and Teochew.

==== Unique characteristics ====
Hainanese has developed unique phonological characteristics such as the use of implosives. Linguists hypothesize this characteristic resulted from the contact between Han Chinese settlers in garrison towns and their Tai-Kradai tribal neighbours. More recently, the island's location close to SE Asia, and the close ties between local Hainanese and the Hainanese diaspora, have led to the adoption of numerous English and Malay words.

Standard Chinese is also the lingua franca in the island province as in the rest of China.

=== Cuisine ===
Numerous signature dishes such as the Hainanese chicken rice, Wenchang chicken, Hainanese pork chop, Hainanese mutton soup, Hainanese salted fish soup and beef noodle soup. Hainanese chicken rice is a recognised dish throughout Southeast Asia due to the Hainanese diaspora in these areas who famed it.

All these signature dishes are served at the various eateries located along Purvis Street, within the Hainanese enclave; as a result, Purvis Street is often referred to as "Hainan Second Street", while Middle Road and Seah Street are referred to as "Hainan First Street" and "Hainan Third Street" respectively. It is often labelled as Singapore's national dish.

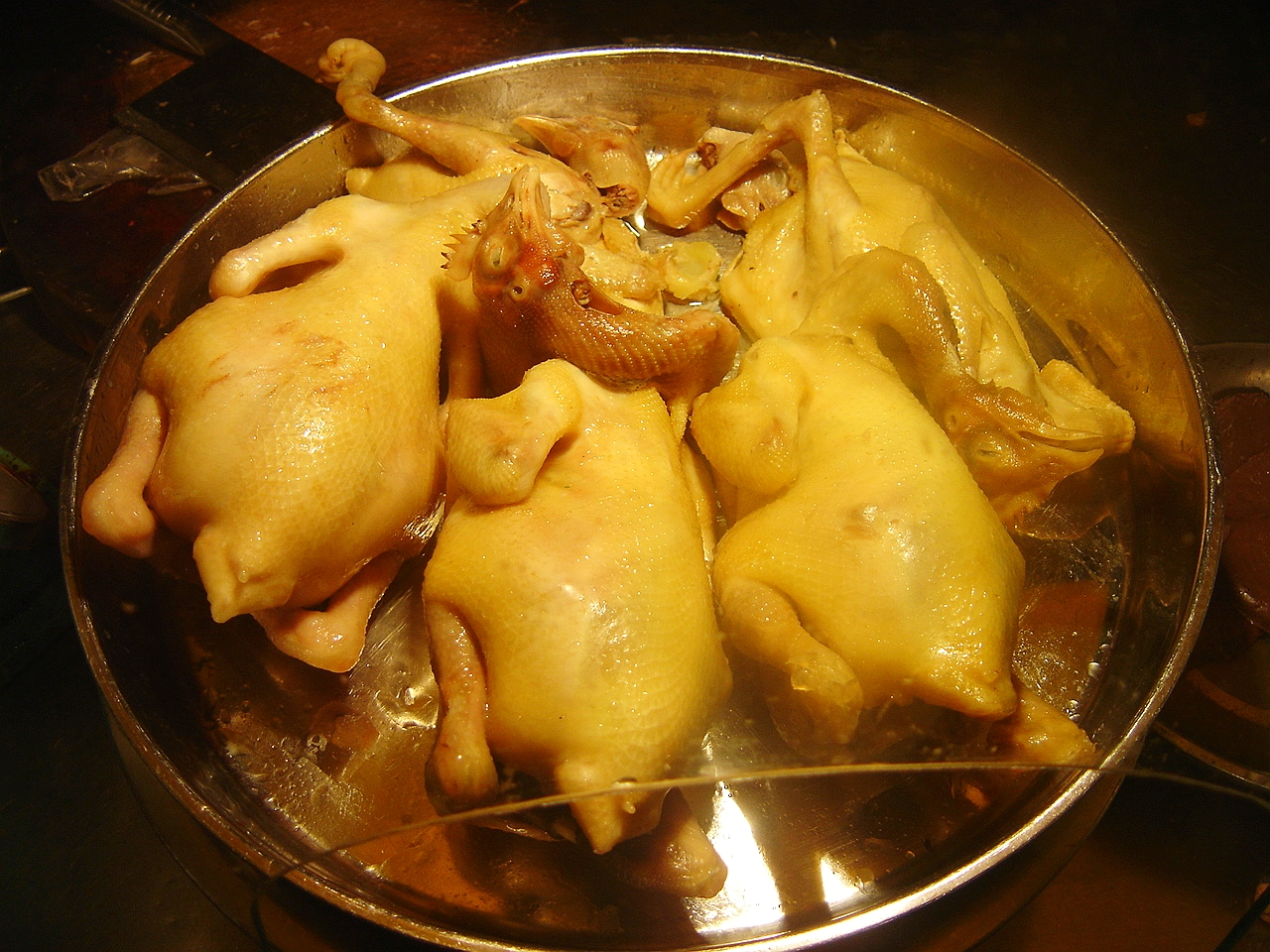
Wenchang chicken

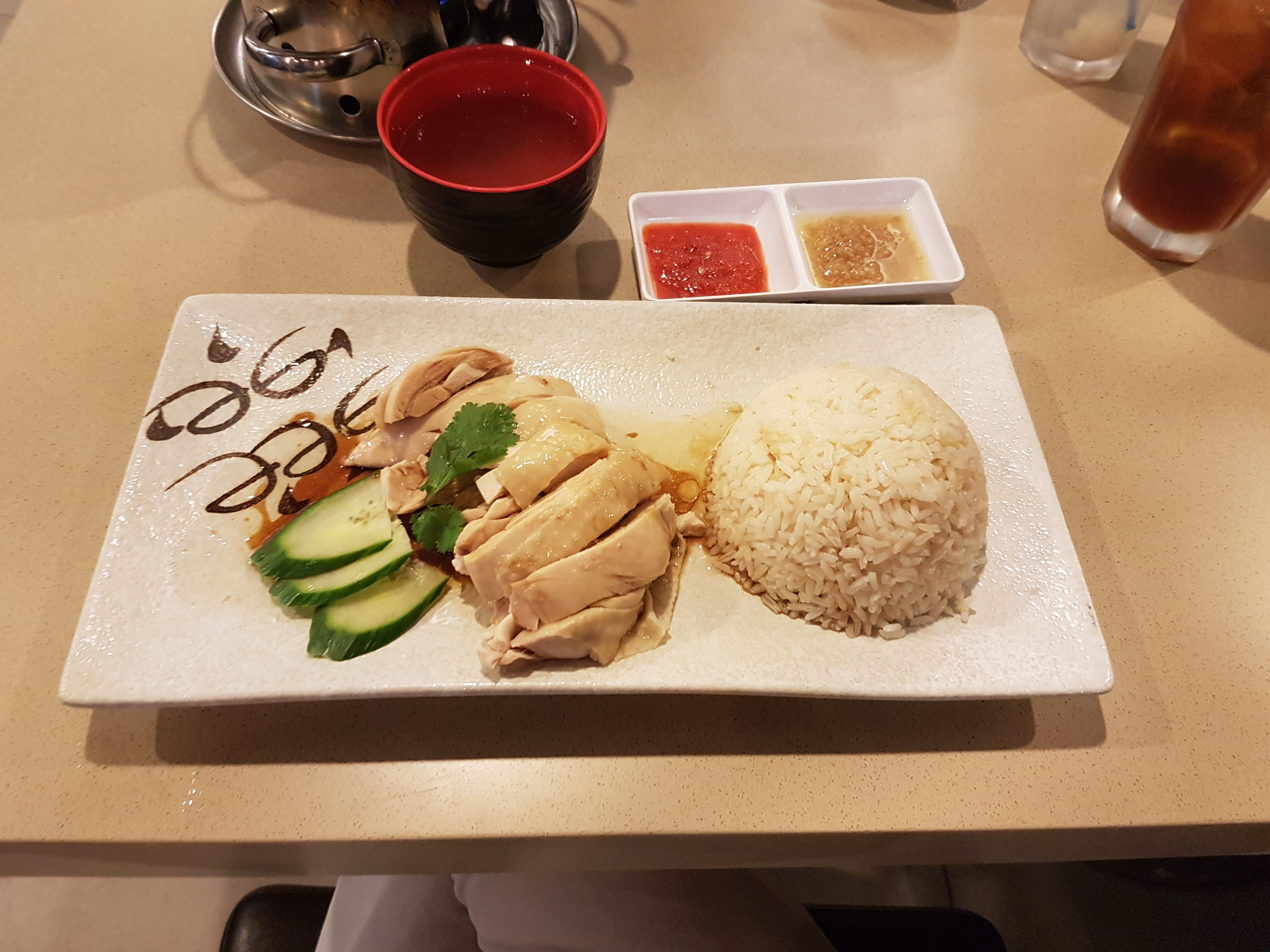
Hainanese chicken rice

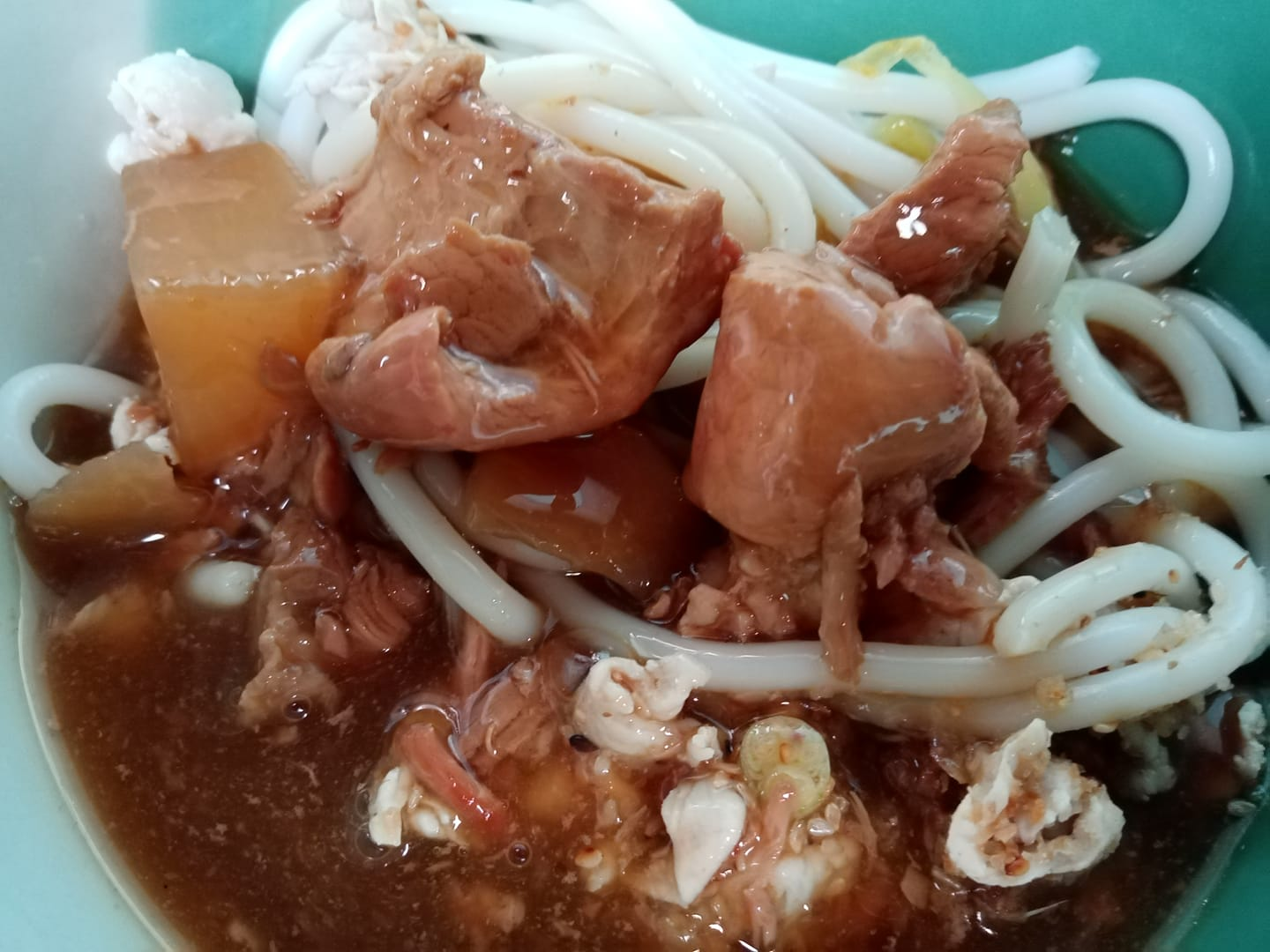
Hainanese rice noodles

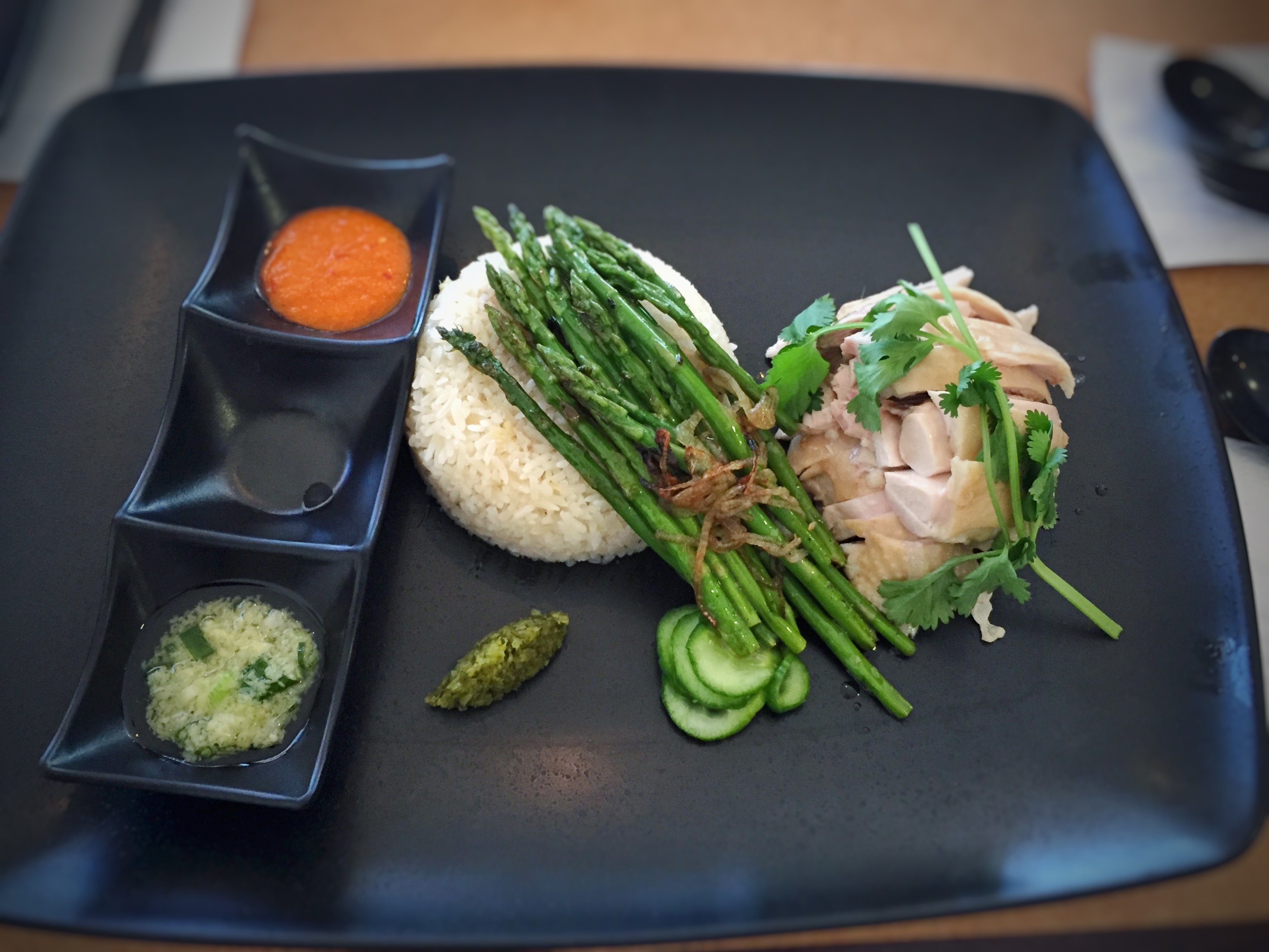
Hainanese chicken rice with a condiment tray

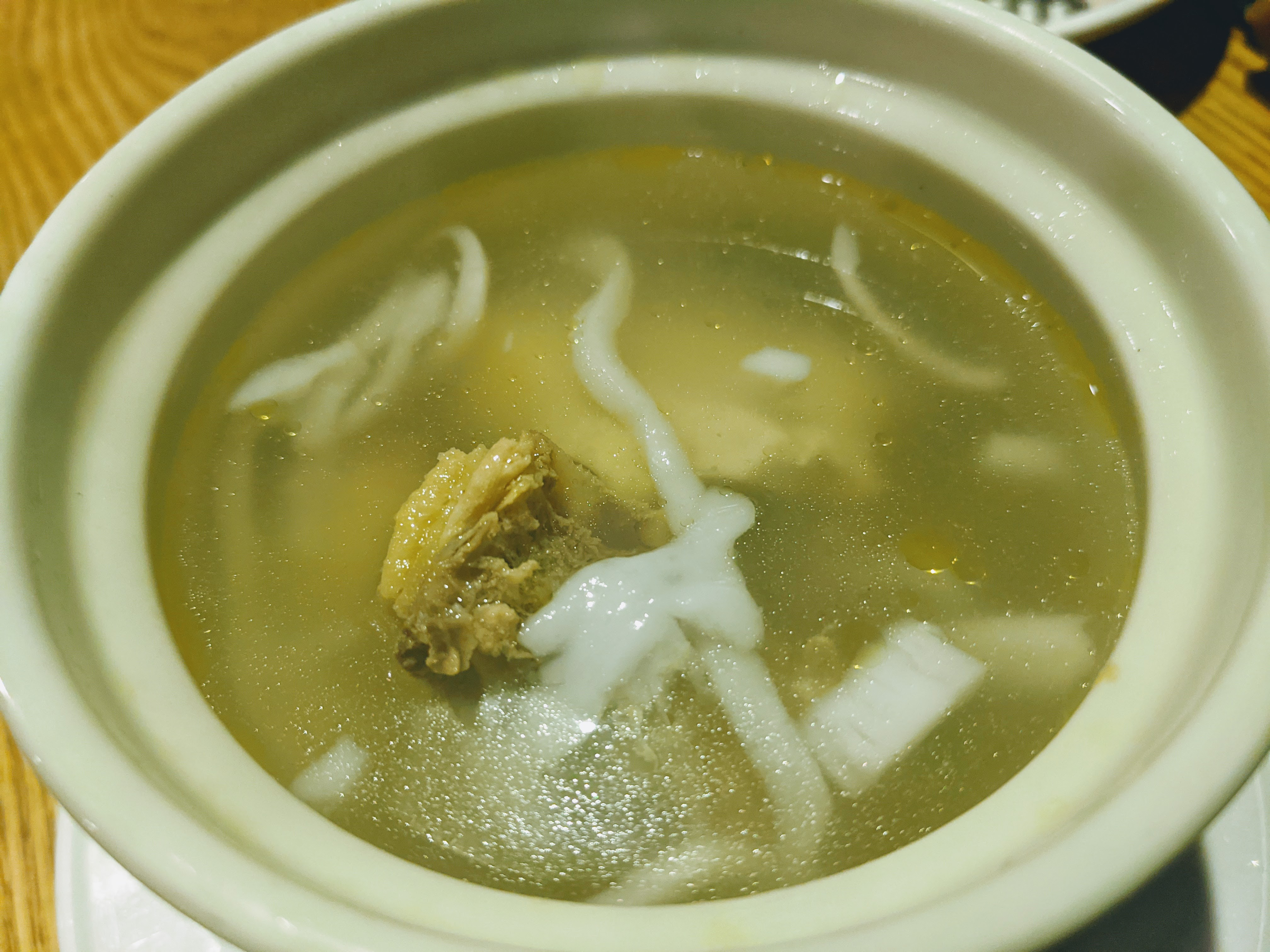
Hainanese coconut soup

=== Architecture ===
Hainanese architecture follows the same design plan as Han Chinese architecture with buildings aligned around a central courtyard or series of courtyards. The style for public buildings follows essentially that from the southern regions such as Fujian, with upturned eaves and ready use of colour. A well-preserved example of Hainanese architecture can actually be seen in Hoi An, Vietnam in the Hoi An Hainanese Assembly Hall as well as in the Memorial of the Five Lords, Haikou.

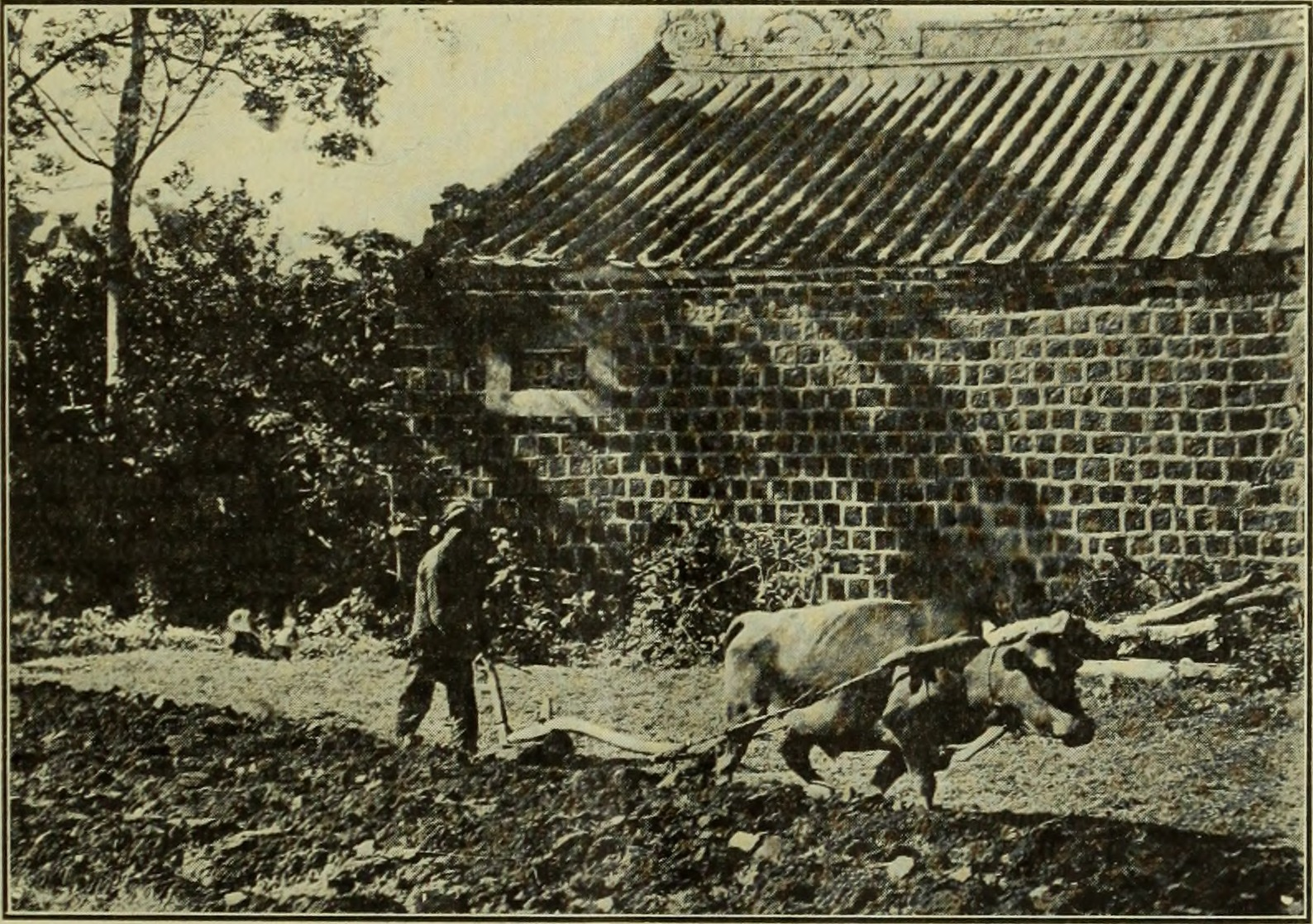
Chinese building in Hainan constructed with traditional Han Chinese building techniques

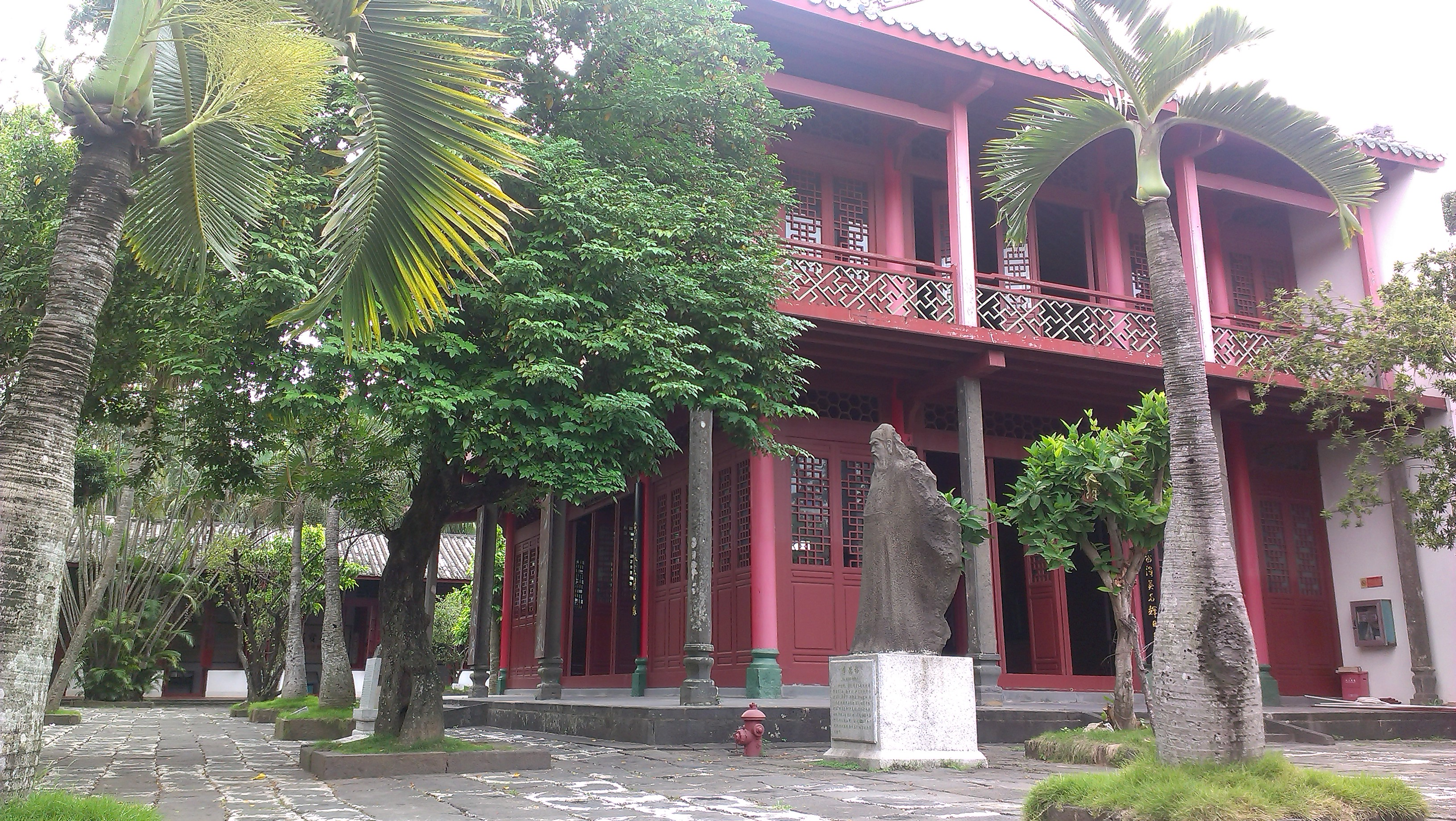
Garden in the Memorial of the Five Lords, Haikou

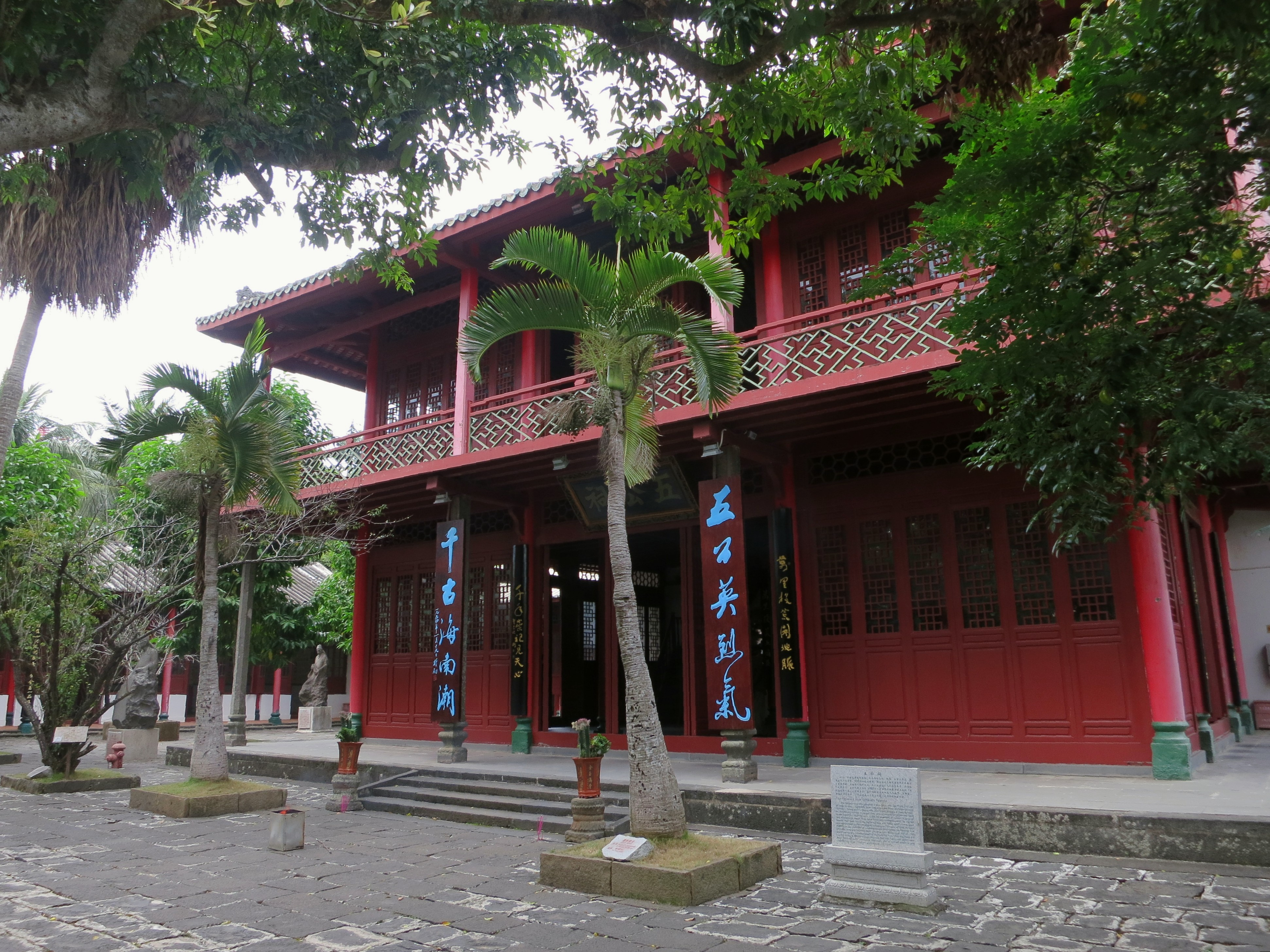
Temple of the Five Lords, Haikou

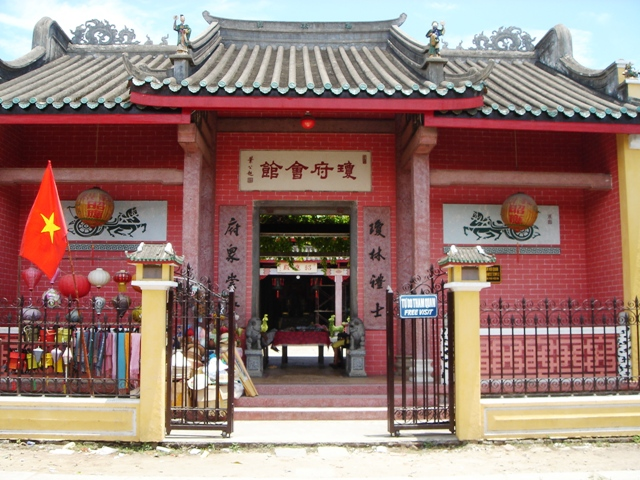
Hainanese assembly hall in Hoi An, Vietnam

=== Arts ===
Hainanese opera (Qiong opera) is a passion for many Hainanese, particularly for the older generation. Enriched with local flavours, Hainanese opera is part and parcel of Hainanese culture.

In addition, Hainan has one of China's oldest musical traditions, known as the "Ba Yin" or "Eight Tone" school of music. It derives from the mainland Chinese musical tradition and was brought over by Han settlers. Traditional Chinese instruments such as string, qin, flute, pipe, flute, gong, drum and cymbal are deployed. However, materials such as coconut shells and rosewood are employed in the crafting of instruments. Historically, almost all villages in Hainan each had their own Bayin troupe and performances were ubiquitous at weddings and funerals. About 500 musical scores from over the last 1000 years, dating to the time of the Song dynasty, have been preserved until today. The art is currently being transmitted amongst the overseas diaspora in Malaysia and Singapore.

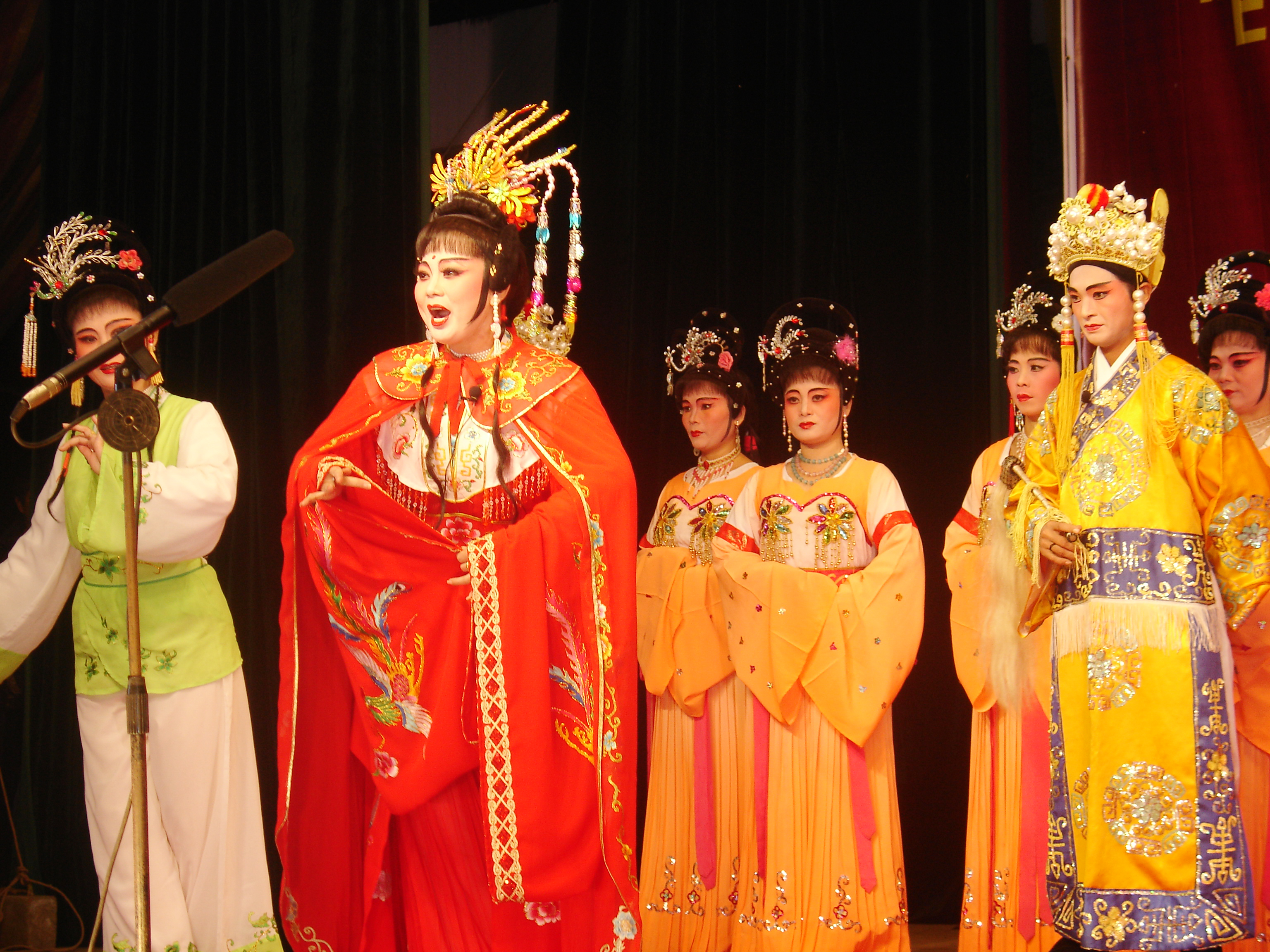
Hainan opera performance

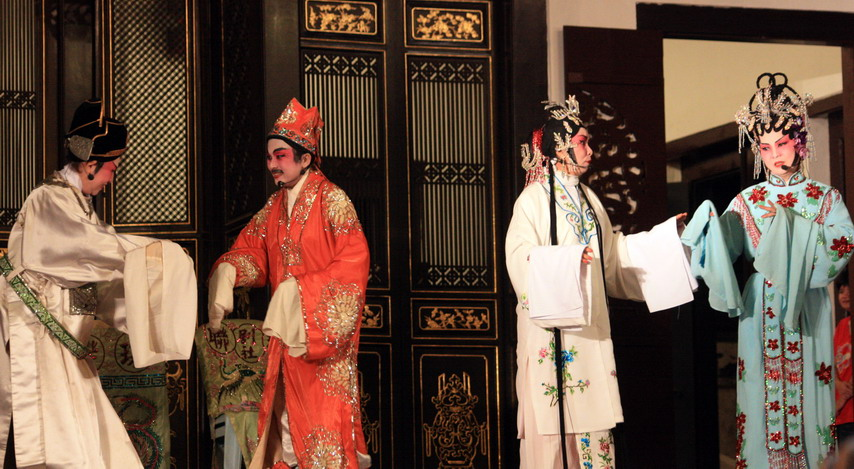
Hainanese opera

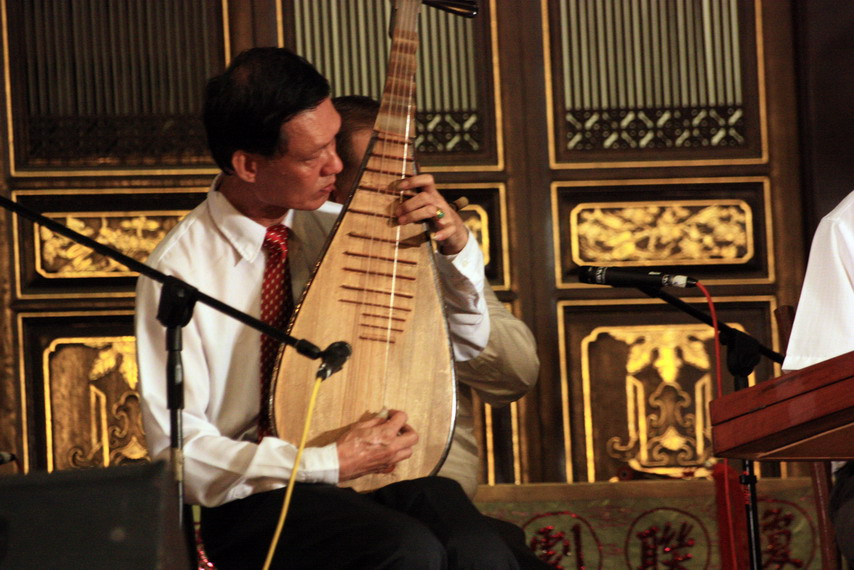
Musical accompaniment to an opera performance

Ceremonial procession in Hainan

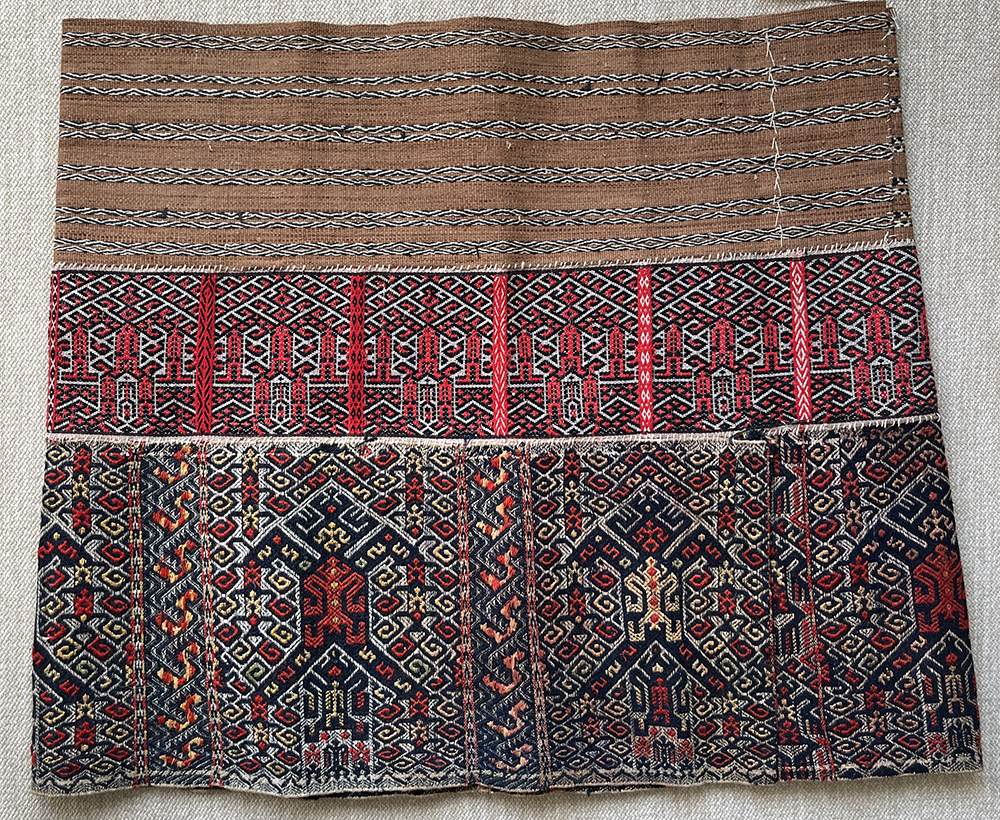
Vintage skirt with human figures woven by the Run Li people of Hainan, courtesy the Wovensouls collection

== See also ==
History

- Song-Jin wars – resulted in a major wave of Han Chinese immigration to the south, including to Hainan Island
- Li Gang – Chinese chancellor exiled to Hainan, with a retinue of advisors
- Su DongPo – Famous Chinese statesman, exiled to Hainan

Language

- Hainanese
- Southern Min

Ethnic group and subgroups

- Han Chinese people
- Hokkien people
- Teochew people
- Cantonese people
- Putian people

Overseas diaspora

- Thai Chinese
- Malaysian Chinese
- Indonesian Chinese

Cuisine

- Hainanese chicken rice
