= Hainanese =

Min Chinese language spoken in Hainan

- Qiongwen, Hainan Min
- 海南話, Hhai3 nam2 ue1, Hái-nâm-oe
- Pronunciation: [hai˨˩˧ nam˨˩ ue˨˧] (Haikou dialect)
- Native to: China, Malaysia, Singapore, Thailand
- Region: Hainan
- Ethnicity: Hainanese (Han Chinese subgroup)
- Native speakers: Around 5 million in China (2002)
- Language family: Sino-Tibetan: Sinitic; Chinese; Min; Coastal Min; Southern Min?; Qiong–Lei; Hainanese
- Early forms: Proto-Sino-Tibetan: Old Chinese (Note: Min is believed to have split from Old Chinese, rather than Middle Chinese like other varieties of Chinese.); Proto-Min
- Dialects: Haikou; Wenchang
- Writing system: Chinese characters Hainanese Pinyin Bǽh-oe-tu

Language codes
- ISO 639-3: hnm
- Glottolog: hain1238
- Linguasphere: 79-AAA-k
- Hainanese

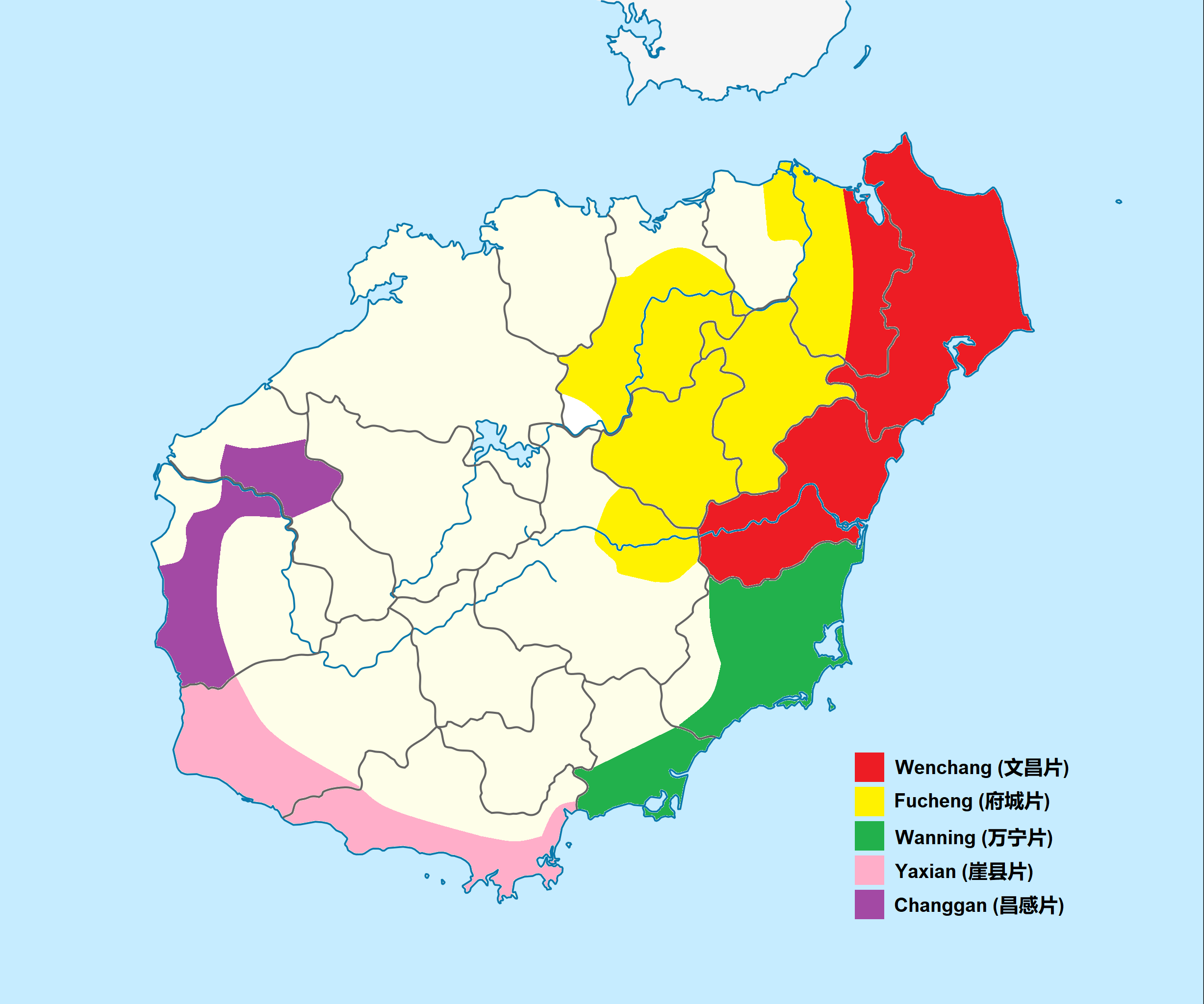
- Varieties of the Hainanese spoken in Hainan.

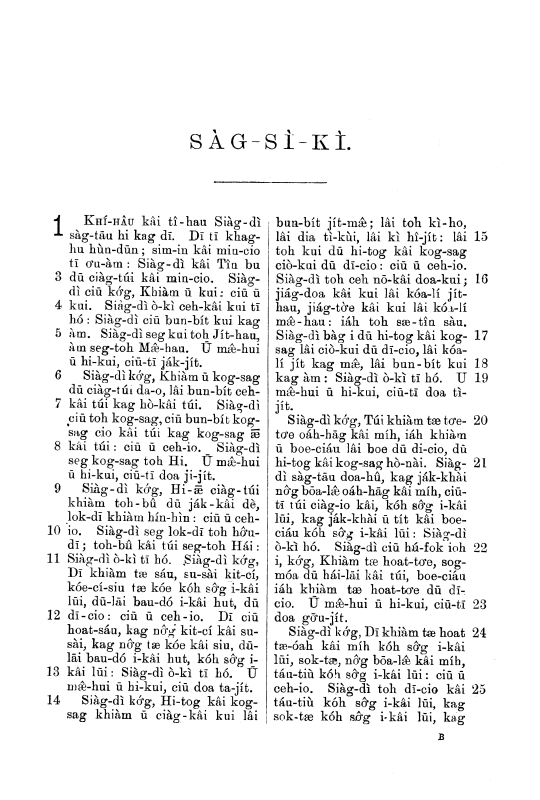
The Book of Genesis in Bǽh-oe-tu, published by the Bible Society of Great Britain

Hainanese (Note: or Hainamese (Hainan Romanised: Hái-nâm-oe, Hainanese Pinyin: Hhai3 nam2 ue1, simplified Chinese: 海南话; traditional Chinese: 海南話; pinyin: Hǎinánhuà), also known as Kengbun/Kengvun (simplified Chinese: 琼文话; traditional Chinese: 瓊文話), Keng language (琼语; 瓊語) or Hainam Min (海南闽语; 海南閩語)) is a variety of Min Chinese spoken on the island of Hainan and by regional overseas Chinese communities.

In the classification by Yuan Jiahua, used by Ethnologue, it is part of the Southern Min group despite being mutually unintelligible with Southern Min varieties such as Hokkien and Teochew. In the classification of Li Rong, used by the Language Atlas of China, it is treated as a separate Min subgroup. Hou Jingyi combines it with Leizhou Min, spoken on the Leizhou Peninsula, in a Qiong–Lei group.

The term "Hainanese" is also used for the language of the Li people living in Hainan, but it generally refers to Min varieties spoken in Hainan.

== Phonology ==
The phonologies of the different varieties of Hainanese are highly divergent, with the Wenchang dialect being the prestige dialect, and often used as a reference.

=== Consonants ===
Below is a table for the consonants of Hainanese across the dialects of Wenchang, Haikou and the dialect of Banqiao Town, in Dongfang. For more information on a specific variety, please consult the relevant article.

		Labial	Dental		Alveolo- palatal	Velar	Glottal
Plosive	voiceless	/p/ (Note: Present in the Banqiao dialect.) 爸 pa	/t/ 洗 toi			/k/ 公 kong	/ʔ/ 啊 a
Plosive	aspirated	/pʰ/ (Note: Present in the Haikou dialect.) 婆 pho	/tʰ/			/kʰ/ 去 khu	
Plosive	voiced	/b/ (Note: Present in the Wenchang dialect, where there is a phonemic distinction between voiced and implosive stop consonants.)	/d/			/g/ (Note: Present in the Wenchang dialect.) 我 gua	
Plosive	implosive	/ɓ/ 北 ɓak	/ɗ/ 茶 ɗei			(/ɠ/) (Note: Not usually transcribed as /ɠ/, and not phonemically distinct from /g/ in the Wenchang dialect or from /ŋ/ in other Hainanese varieties.)	
Affricate	voiceless			/ts/	/tɕ/ 食 tsia		
Affricate	aspirated			/tsʰ/			
Affricate	voiced			/dz/	/dʑ/ 日 jit		
Fricative	voiceless	/ɸ/ 皮 fi	/θ/	/s/ 事 sei	/ɕ/	/x/	/h/ 海 hai
Fricative	voiced	/v/ 文 vun		/z/ 欲 zok			/ɦ/
Nasal		/m/ 目 mak	/n/ 念 niam			/ŋ/ 乐 ngak	
Approximant		/w/ 发 wat	/l/ 老 lao		/j/ 肉 yok		

Many of the most widely spoken varieties of Hainanese notably have a series of implosive consonants, /ɓ/ and /ɗ/, which were acquired through contact with surrounding languages, probably Hlai. However, more conservative varieties of Hainanese such as Banqiao remain closer to Teochew and other varieties of Southern Min.

The consonant system of Hainanese corresponds well with that of Hokkien, but it has had some restructuring. In particular:

- Etymological plain stops have undergone implosivization (*p > [ɓ], *t > [ɗ]) in the more innovative varieties such as Wenchang and Haikou.
- Etymological aspirated stops have spirantized (*pʰ > [ɸ], *tʰ > [h], *tsʰ > [ɕ], *kʰ > [h~x]) in more innovative varieties.
- The lenition of an historic *b into [v] in Banqiao and Haikou, though not in Wenchang.
- Former *s has hardened into a stop (*s > [t]), although in the more conservative Banqiao dialect some instances have only undergone fortition to (*s > [θ]), and others have remained [s].
- Former *h has become [ɦ] in Wenchang.

Additionally, [ʑ] is an allophone of /j/.

These changes also make Hainanese fairly close to Sino-Vietnamese vocabulary.

Chinese character	Mandarin	Taiwanese Hokkien	Haikou Hainanese	Sino-Vietnamese
邪	xié	siâ	dia2	da
仙	xiān	sian	din1	tiên
散	sàn	suànn	dan4	tàn
跡	jì	jiak	di1	tích
神	shén	sîn	din2	thần
痴	chī	chi	si1	si

=== Vowels ===
Hainanese has seven phonemic vowels.

	Front	Central	Back
Close	/i/		/u/
Close-mid	/e/		/o/
Open-mid	/ɛ/		/ɔ/
Open		/a/	

=== Tones ===
Tone chart of the Hainan dialect
Tone number	Tone name	Tone contour	Example
1	yin ping (阴平)	˨˦ (24)	诗
2	yang ping (阳平)	˨˩ (21)	时
3	yin shang (阴上)	˨˩˩ (211)	死
4	yin qu (阴去)	˧˥ (35)	四
5	yang qu (阳去)	˧ (33)	是
6	yin ru (阴入)	˥ (5)	失
7	yang ru (阳入)	˧ (3)	实
8	chang ru (长入)	˥ (55)	视

== Romanization ==
=== Hainanese Pinyin ===
Hainanese Pinyin (海南话拼音方案) is a phonetic system announced by the Education Administration Department of Guangdong Province in September 1960. It marks tones with numbers.

==== Initials ====
IPA	Hainanese Pinyin	Bǽh-oe-tu	Example
/ɓ/	b	b	北
/p/	b	p	波
/pʰ/	p	ph	坡
/ɸ/	p	f	皮
/m/	m	m	摩
/b/	v	b	?
/v/	v	v	无
/t/	d	t	装
/ɗ/	dd	d	刀
/n/	n	n	挪
/l/	l	l	罗
/k/	g	k	哥
/ŋ/	ng	g	俄
/x/	h	kh	可
/h/	hh	h	号
/ɠ/	gh	g	我
/ts/	z	c	支
/s/	s	s	妻
/z/	y	j	余

==== Finals ====
IPA	Hainanese Pinyin	Bǽh-oe-tu	Example
/a/	a	a	亚
/o/	o	o	荷
/ɛ/	e	e	摩
/i/	i	i	医
/u/	u	u	呜
ai	ai	ai	哀
ɔi	oi	oi	鞋
au	ao	au	喉
ia	ia	ia	也
iɔ	io	io	腰
ua	ua	oa	换
ue	ue	oe	话
ui	ui	oi	威
uai	uai	oai	坏
ɔu	ou	ou	黑
iu	iu	iu	柚
iau	iao	iau	妖
iam	iam	iam	厌
im	im	im	音
am	am	am	暗
an	an	an	安
in	in	in	烟
un	un	un	温
uan	uan	oan	弯
aŋ	ang	ag	红
eŋ	eng	eg	英
ɔŋ	ong	og	翁
iaŋ	iang	iag	央
uaŋ	uang	oag	汪
iɔŋ	iong	iog	匈
ip	ib	ib	邑
iap	iab	iab	协
at	ad	at	遏
it	id	it	乙
ut	ud	ut	核
uat	uad	oat	挖
ak	ag	ak	鹤
ek	eg	ek	益
ok	og	ok	喔
iok	iog	iok	育
uak	uag	oak	廓
-ʔ	-h	-h	不

== Grammar ==
Hainanese is known for having post-verbal locative prepositional phrases, as opposed to having such phrases in the pre-verbal position, as is common in most other varieties of Chinese. For example:

伊 大聲 啼 佇 房裡
ʔi24 ɗua24 tia24 hi21 ɗu33 ɓaŋ21-lɛ33
3SG loudly cry in room-LOC
He was crying loudly in the room.

This has been attributed to contact with the Kra–Dai languages of Hainan, such as Hlai and Be.

== See also ==
- Hainanese people
