= Wenchang dialect =

Min Chinese dialect of Hainan, China

Wenchang
- 文昌话
- Native to: Southern China
- Region: Wenchang, Hainan
- Language family: Sino-Tibetan: Sinitic; Chinese; Min; Coastal Min; Southern Min?; Qiong–Lei; Hainanese; Wenchang
- Early forms: Proto-Sino-Tibetan: Old Chinese (Note: Min is believed to have split from Old Chinese, rather than Middle Chinese like other varieties of Chinese.); Proto-Min

Language codes
- ISO 639-3: –
- Glottolog: wenc1234 Wenchang
- Linguasphere: > 79-AAA-kdb 79-AAA-kd > 79-AAA-kdb

The Wenchang dialect (simplified Chinese: 文昌话; traditional Chinese: 文昌話; pinyin: Wénchānghuà) is a dialect of Hainanese spoken in Wenchang, a county-level city in the northeast of Hainan, an island province in southern China.

It is considered the prestige form of Hainanese, and is used by the provincial broadcasting media.

== Phonology ==
The initials of the Wenchang dialect are as follows:

Wenchang dialect initials
		Bilabial	Dental	Palatal	Velar	Glottal
Stop / Affricate	voiceless		t	tɕ	k	ʔ
Stop / Affricate	voiced implosive	ɓ	ɗ			
Stop / Affricate	voiced	b	d	dʑ	g	
Nasal		m	n		ŋ	
Fricative	voiceless	ɸ	s	ɕ		h
Fricative	voiced	(w)		(j)		ɦ
Lateral			l			

The semivowels [w] and [j] are in complementary distribution with [ɦ], and may be treated as allophones of the same phoneme. The voiced stops /d/ and /g/ occur with only about ten words each.

There are five vowels, /i/, /u/, /ɛ/, /ɔ/ and /a/. The high vowels /i/ and /u/ may also occur as medials.

The possible finals are:

Wenchang dialect finals
Vocalic codas			Nasal codas			Stop codas		
a 阿	ai 爱	au 后	am 暗	an 安	aŋ 红	ap 盒	at 达	ak 北
ɛ 下	ei 事				eiŋ 英			eik 益
i 皮		iu 手		in 新		ip 邑	it 必	
ia 写		iau 妖	iam 念	iɛn 联	iaŋ 谁	iap 狭	iɛt 捏	iak 菊
iɔ 笑			iom 心		iɔŋ 用	iop 涩		iɔk 育
ɔ 歌	ɔi 鞋	ou 侯	ɔm 栾	ɔn 春	ɔŋ 公	ɔp 合	ɔt 黜	ɔk 乐
u 有	ui 气			un 轮			ut 脫	
ua 娃	uai 快			uan 湾	uaŋ 广		uat 挖	uak 廓
ue 话								
			m̩ 毋		ŋ̍ 嗯			

The Wenchang dialect has six tones on isolated syllabes:

Wenchang tones
	level (píng 平)	rising (shàng 上)	departing (qù 去)	entering (rù 入)
upper (yīn 阴)	˦	ʔ˨˩	˩	ʔ˥˩
lower (yáng 阳)	˧	ʔ˦˨		
