= Qiongshan, Haikou =

Qiongshan 琼山区 Kiungshan; Chiungshan
- District
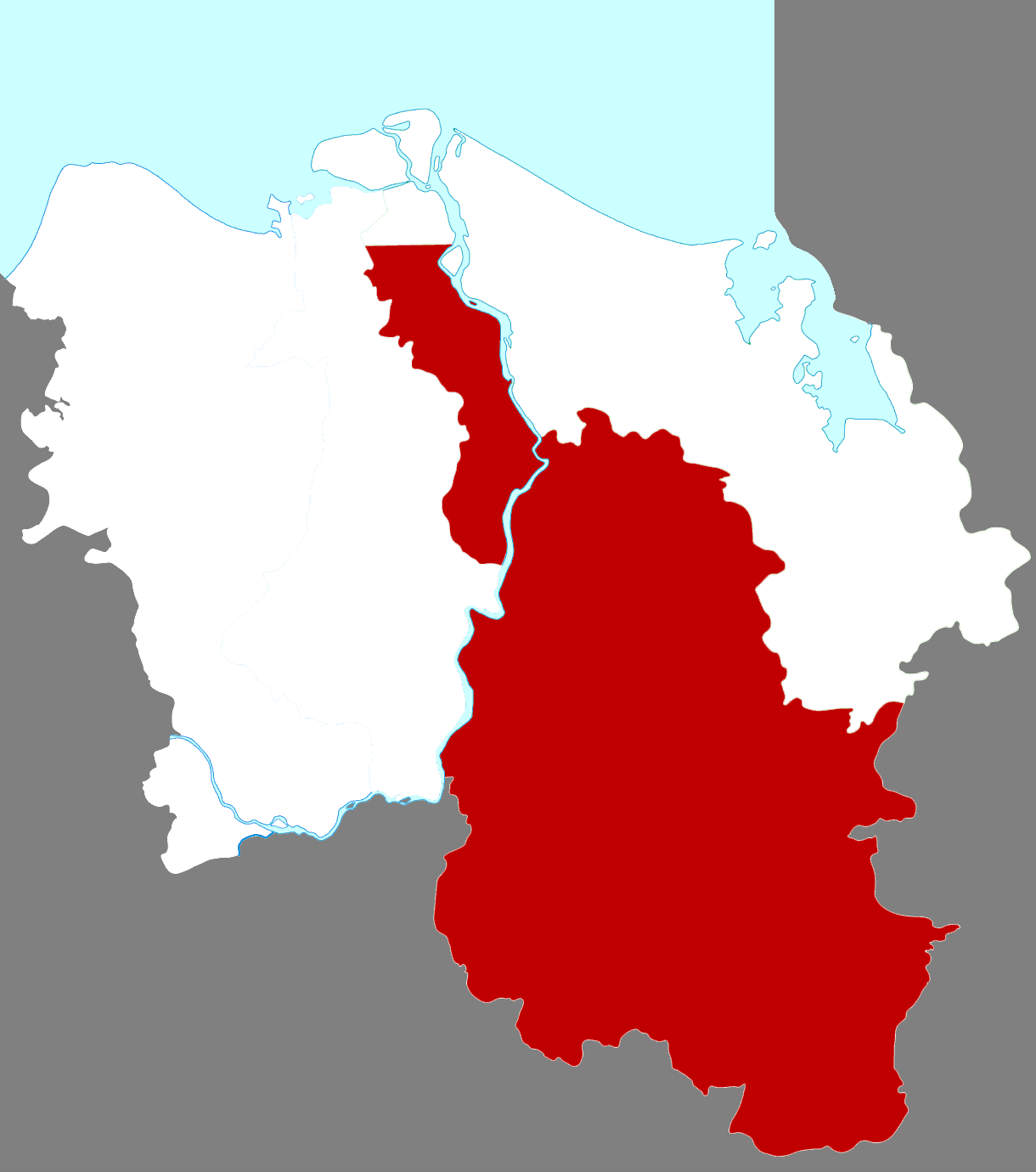

- Location in Hainan
- Coordinates: 20°00′12″N 110°21′14″E
- Country: People's Republic of China
- Province: Hainan
- Prefecture-level city: Haikou

Area
  - Total: 928.62 km^{2} (358.54 sq mi)

Population (2002)
  - Total: 360,000
  - Density: 390/km^{2} (1,000/sq mi)
- Time zone: UTC+8 (China standard time)

Qiongshan
- Simplified Chinese: 琼山
- Traditional Chinese: 瓊山
- Postal: Kiungshan
- Literal meaning: Jade Mountain
Transcriptions
Standard Mandarin
- Hanyu Pinyin: Qióngshān
- Wade–Giles: Ch‘iung-shan

Former names

Qiongzhou
- Traditional Chinese: 瓊州
- Simplified Chinese: 琼州
- Postal: Kiungchow
- Literal meaning: Jade Prefecture
Transcriptions
Standard Mandarin
- Hanyu Pinyin: Qióngzhōu
- Wade–Giles: Ch‘iung-chou

Qiongshan District, alternately romanized as Kiungshan, is a district in Haikou City, Hainan.

== History ==
As Qiongzhou, formerly romanized as Kiungchow, (Note: Other romanizations of Qiongzhou include Keung-chow Foo.) the district was formerly a separate city which served as the center of Chinese administration on Hainan Island when it formed a part of Guangdong Province.

The British Consulate in Kiungchow was opened in April 1876, as a result of the Treaty of Tientsin in 1858.

== Geography ==
Dongzhai Port Nature Reserve is located in the district and has an area of 2,500 hectares (6,200 acres). It includes six rivers, an irregular coastline, and a number of bays and tidewater gullies. The mangrove forest on the south coast provides a habitat for birds and other wildlife.

== Climate ==
Climate data for Qiongshan District, elevation 10 m (33 ft), (1991–2020 normals)
| Month | Jan | Feb | Mar | Apr | May | Jun | Jul | Aug | Sep | Oct | Nov | Dec | Year |
|---|---|---|---|---|---|---|---|---|---|---|---|---|---|
| Mean daily maximum °C (°F) | 21.2 (70.2) | 22.9 (73.2) | 26.6 (79.9) | 30.1 (86.2) | 32.5 (90.5) | 33.7 (92.7) | 33.4 (92.1) | 32.6 (90.7) | 31.1 (88.0) | 28.9 (84.0) | 26.0 (78.8) | 22.3 (72.1) | 28.4 (83.2) |
| Daily mean °C (°F) | 18.3 (64.9) | 19.5 (67.1) | 22.6 (72.7) | 25.8 (78.4) | 28.1 (82.6) | 29.1 (84.4) | 29.1 (84.4) | 28.6 (83.5) | 27.8 (82.0) | 26.1 (79.0) | 23.3 (73.9) | 19.8 (67.6) | 24.8 (76.7) |
| Mean daily minimum °C (°F) | 16.3 (61.3) | 17.3 (63.1) | 20.1 (68.2) | 23.1 (73.6) | 25.3 (77.5) | 26.2 (79.2) | 26.2 (79.2) | 26.0 (78.8) | 25.5 (77.9) | 23.9 (75.0) | 21.4 (70.5) | 18.0 (64.4) | 22.4 (72.4) |
| Average precipitation mm (inches) | 28.1 (1.11) | 32.3 (1.27) | 43.6 (1.72) | 96.6 (3.80) | 208.0 (8.19) | 251.0 (9.88) | 243.3 (9.58) | 302.7 (11.92) | 284.7 (11.21) | 263.3 (10.37) | 63.7 (2.51) | 42.4 (1.67) | 1,859.7 (73.23) |
| Average precipitation days (≥ 0.1 mm) | 9.1 | 9.7 | 9.7 | 11.1 | 16.0 | 16.7 | 16.0 | 15.2 | 14.7 | 11.1 | 8.4 | 8.4 | 146.1 |
| Average relative humidity (%) | 85 | 86 | 84 | 82 | 80 | 79 | 79 | 81 | 82 | 79 | 79 | 80 | 81 |
| Mean monthly sunshine hours | 92.3 | 96.9 | 130.9 | 165.2 | 215.5 | 217.6 | 238.3 | 215.7 | 181.5 | 171.7 | 128.3 | 98.8 | 1,952.7 |
| Percentage possible sunshine | 27 | 30 | 35 | 44 | 53 | 55 | 59 | 55 | 50 | 48 | 39 | 29 | 44 |
Source: China Meteorological Administration

== Demographics ==
Mandarin is the official language of administration and education, but locals also speak Haikou dialect of Hainanese (a Min language), while other ethnic groups also speak the Qiongshan dialect of Lingao.

== See also ==
- Qiongzhou Strait
