= Haiwen Bridge =

Bridge in People's Republic of China

Haiwen Bridge 海文大桥
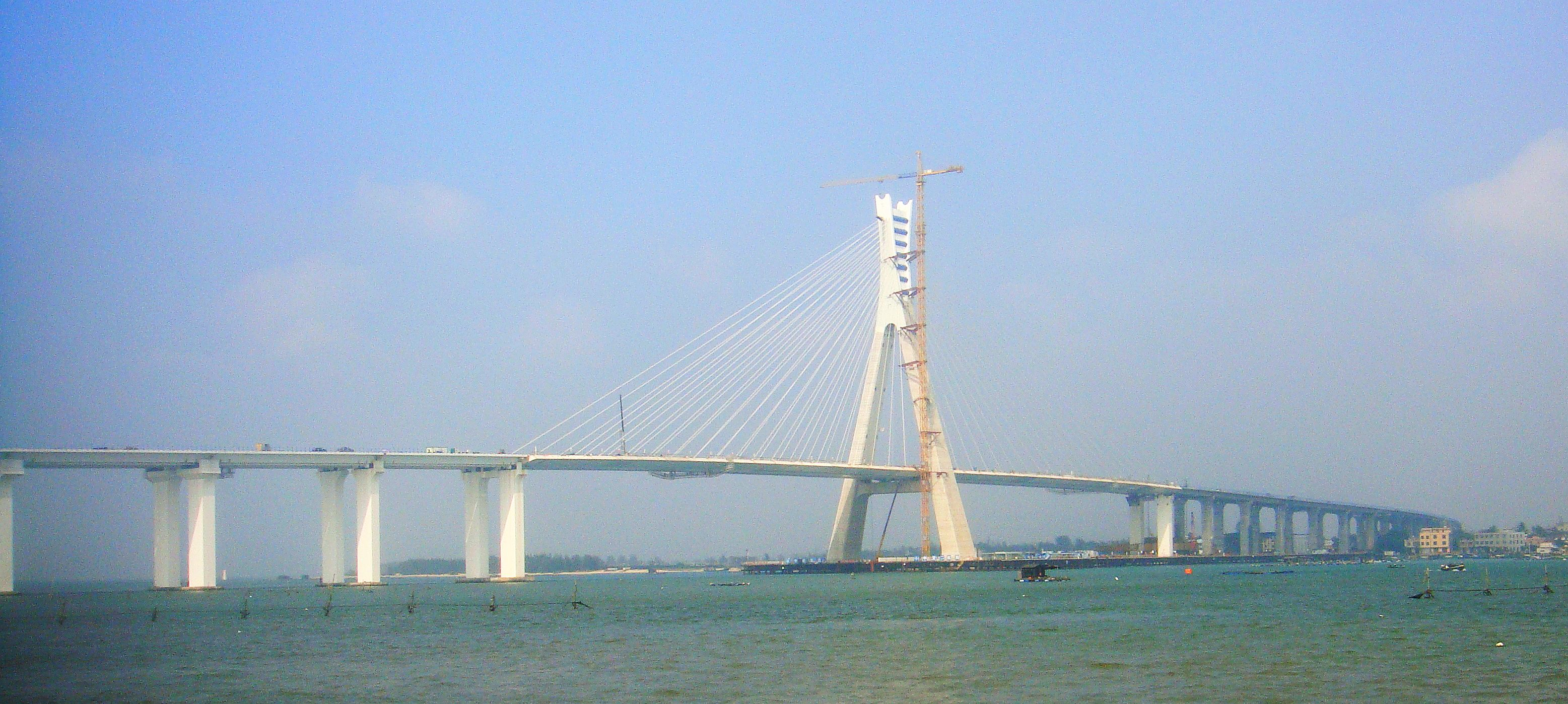
- Haiwen Bridge in December 2018
- Coordinates: 20.0264°N 110.5721°E
- Crosses: Dongzhai Harbor
- Locale: Haikou, Hainan, China
- Official name: Haiwen Bridge
- Other name: Puqian Bridge (name during construction)

Characteristics
- Design: Single pylon cable-stayed bridge
- Total length: 3,959 metres (12,989 ft)
- Width: 37.3 metres (122 ft)
- Longest span: 230 metres (750 ft)

History
- Opened: March 2019

Location
- Interactive map of Haiwen Bridge

Haiwen Bridge (Chinese: 海文大桥) (named Puqian Bridge while under construction) is a cable-stayed bridge located east of Haikou City, Hainan, China. It crosses the mouth of Dongzhai Harbor and was built to provide quicker access between Haikou and Wenchang, a large, administrative division of Hainan province. (The area of Wenchang contains the city of Wenchang further south.) The bridge reduced travel time from Haikou to Wenchang from 90 minutes down to around 20 minutes.

== Location ==
The eastern end of the bridge terminates at the town of Puqian. The western end has abutments on, and crosses over, a small island named Beigang Island. It then terminates on the western side of the mouth of Dongzhai Harbor. There, it connects to the nearly complete Jiangdong Avenue (江东大道) which runs west to connect to the Haikou New East Bridge and to start of Haidian No. 5 East Road which leads through Xinbu Island and into Haidian Island, part of Haikou City. Haiwen Bridge effectively connects the east side of the Dongzhai Harbor to Haikou.

== Construction ==
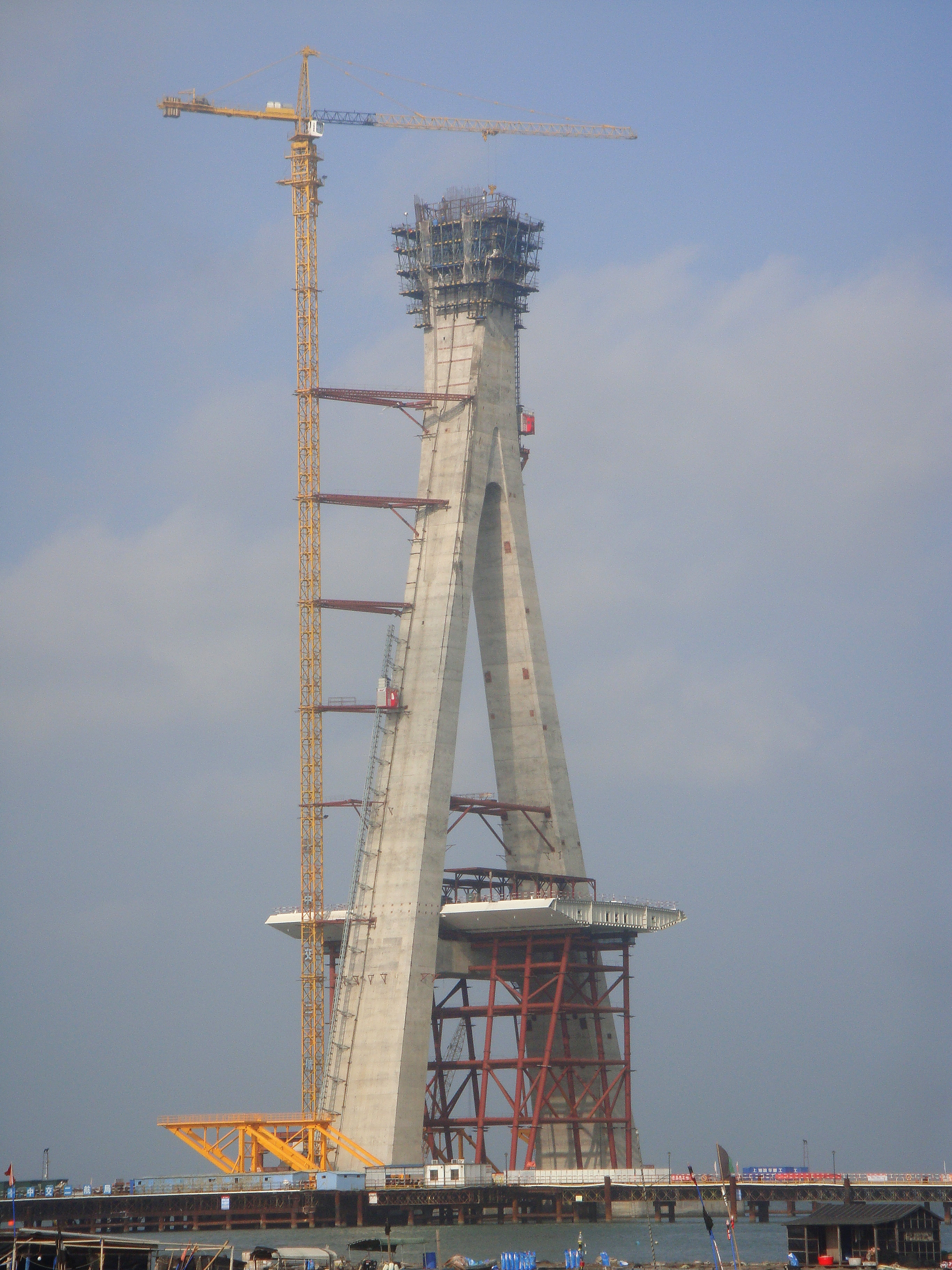
Main pylon

Haiwen Bridge is a single-pylon, double-plane, steel box girder, cable-stayed bridge. The entire length of the bridge is 3959 metres long and 37.3 metres wide. The main span consists two, 230-metre sections, one on each side of the pylon. The deck is steel with a flat, closed box cross section 37.3 metres wide and 3.3 metres deep. The surface contains a two-way, six-lane road.

== Resistance to earthquakes ==
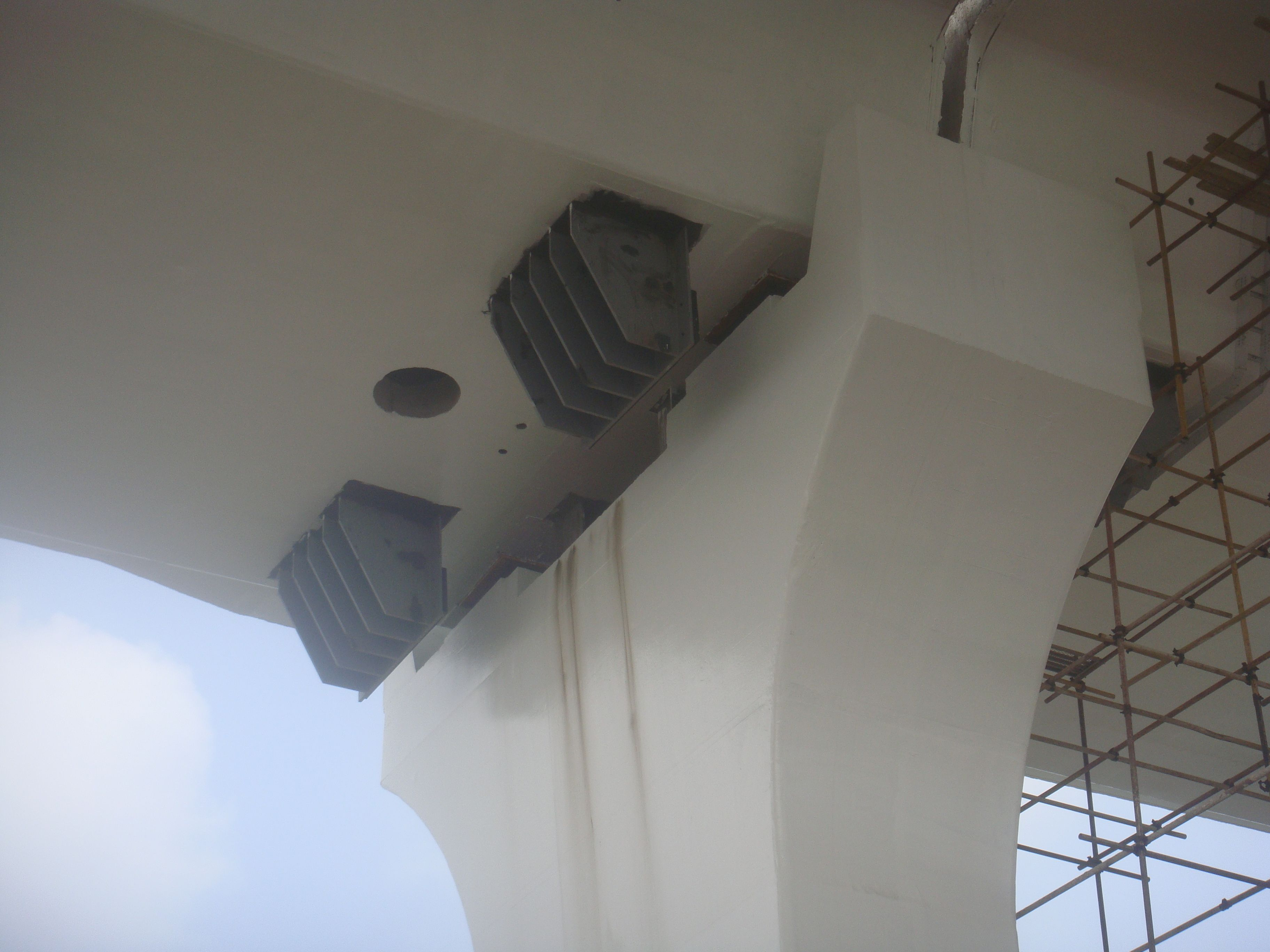
The abutments are designed to handle considerable sway

Because Haiwen Bridge crosses over a geological fault line, it is built to withstand earthquakes. The area was devastated by the 1605 Qiongshan earthquake.

=== Records ===
Haiwen Bridge is the biggest single-tower, double-cable-plane, steel box girder cable-stayed bridge in Hainan.

As of 2018, compared to any other bridge in China, this bridge has the best seismic resistance fortification, is designed to resist the highest winds, and is the only cross-sea type bridge that is built over seismic faults. It is also a first in employing a continuous steel box, across-fault, girder structural system, as well as having the biggest domestic steel pipe foundation, which comprises thirty-two steel pipe composite piles, each one having a diameter of 4.3 metres.

== Timeline ==
Construction of Haiwen Bridge began on March 7, 2015. The bridge opened on March 18, 2019. The estimated cost is 3.01 billion Renminbi ($440 million).
