= Beigang Island =

Island in Hainan, China

Coordinates: 20.0163°N 110.5666°E

Native name: 北港岛
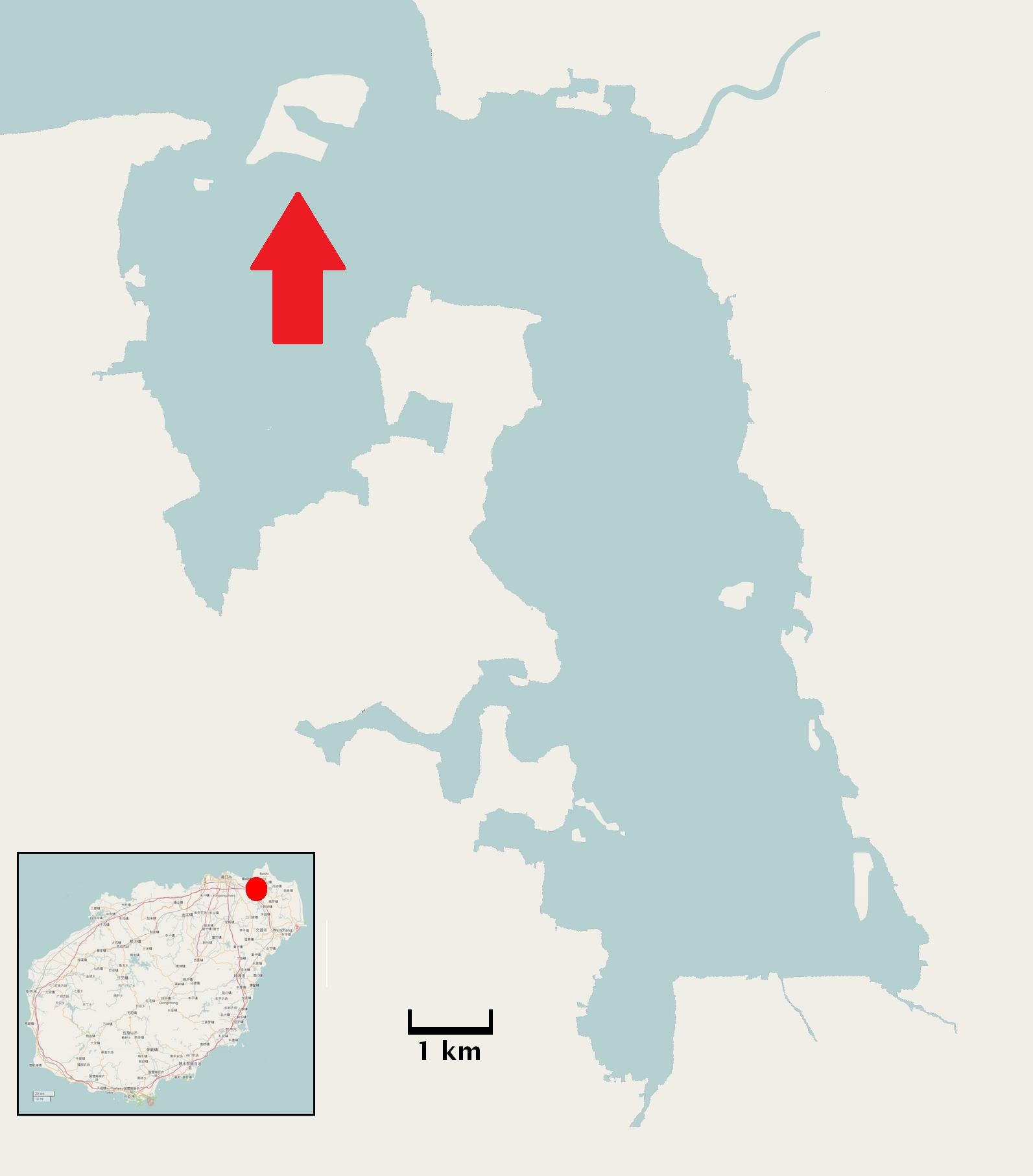
- Beigang Island in the mouth of Dongzhai Harbor
- Interactive map of Beigang Island

Geography
- Location: Dongzhai Harbor, Hainan, China.
- Area: 0.94 km^{2} (0.36 sq mi)
- Length: 1.0 km (0.62 mi)
- Width: 0.6 km (0.37 mi)

Administration
- China
- Province: Hainan

Demographics
- Population: 1,550

Beigang Island (Chinese: 北港岛), literally North Port Island, is a small island located in the mouth of Dongzhai Harbor, Hainan, China. There are three villages, fish farms, and some mangroves on the island. Beigang Island is under the jurisdiction of Meilan District.

== History ==
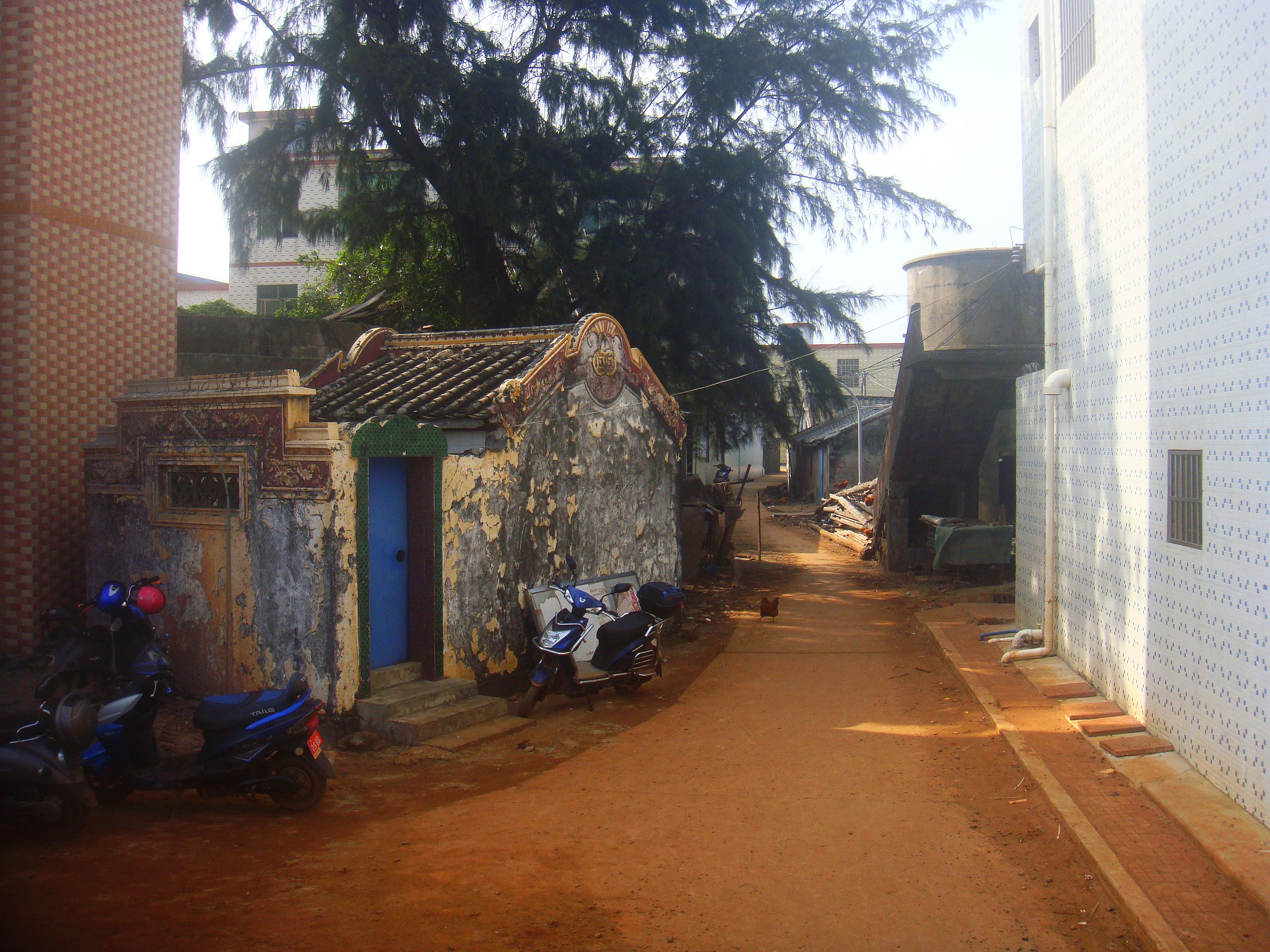
A main intersection showing one of the remaining temples

Beigang Island was originally part of the mainland to its west. The 1605 Nankai earthquake, which saw the sinking of 72 other villages, separated it and it then became an island. It has been inhabited for around 400 years.

In July 2014, Typhoon Rammasun caused extensive damage to the island. Around 70% of the houses that were constructed with tiled roofs were damaged or destroyed. Also, about 123 fishing boats sunk or were destroyed. Much of the island was submerged beneath 1.5 metres of water causing damaged to the food supplies of 70% of the families there. The damage was assessed at around 25 million RMB. Despite the disaster, none of the residents left the island to live elsewhere.

As a result of the typhoon, the government funded the construction of new fishing boats and charitable donations were received to help rebuild. In 2018, the number of boats was up to 120 and the island had been restored.

After the typhoon, the government wanted to relocated the residents to a village off the island, but the residents wished to remain. So began a plan to protect the island from future typhoons. By 2018, a seawall has been built around part of the island, and a new harbor had been created on the west coast to protect the boats.

== Geography ==
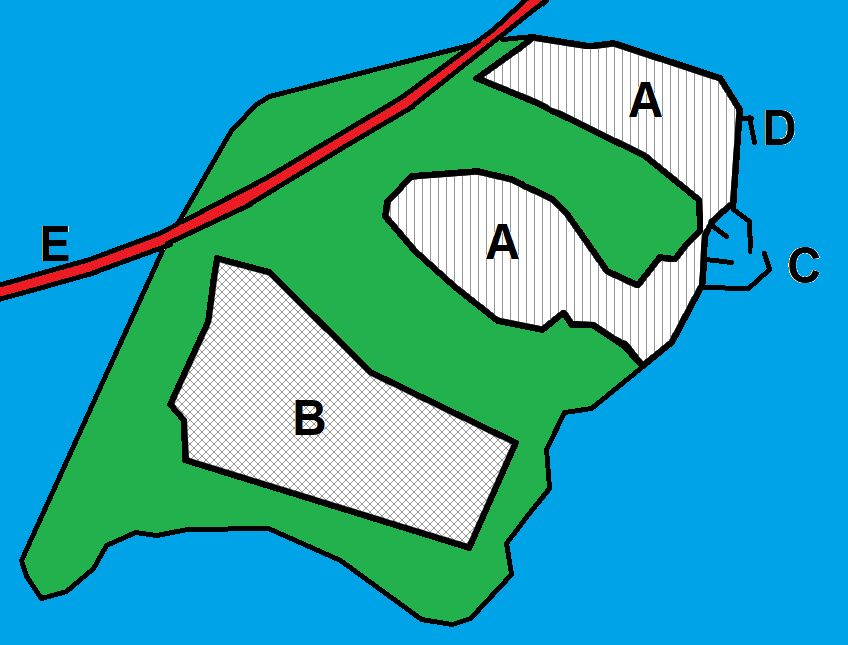
A: Villages; B: Fish farms; C: New harbor; D: Ferry terminal; E: Puqian Bridge

The island has an area of 2,330 acres, is nearly flat, and has a low elevation above sea level. The Puqian Bridge crosses directly above the northern part of the island and uses the island to support some of the abutments. Much of the land in too saline to be farmed. There are few paved roads on the island.

=== Southern area ===
The south part of the island is mainly mangrove, vacant land, and fish farms. The roughly sixty fish farms are located furthest south. North of them is an area of mangrove that is home to some of the same birds found in the Dongzhai Port Nature Reserve. Also living in the mangrove is Marinomonas mangrovi, a species of gram-negative bacterium from the genus of Marinomonas. It was identified after being isolated from the mangrove's rhizospheric soil. The villages are located in the north part of the island.

=== Villages ===
The northeast part has three villages with a population of 1,550 residents in 450 households. One of the villages is named Hou Xi Village. There are one or two shops and numerous small temples. Nearly all of the buildings on the island are residential, most of which are now one or two-story concrete structures, able to withstand typhoons. A few of the old, tile-roofed buildings remain, but are mostly dilapidated and unoccupied.

=== Harbor ===
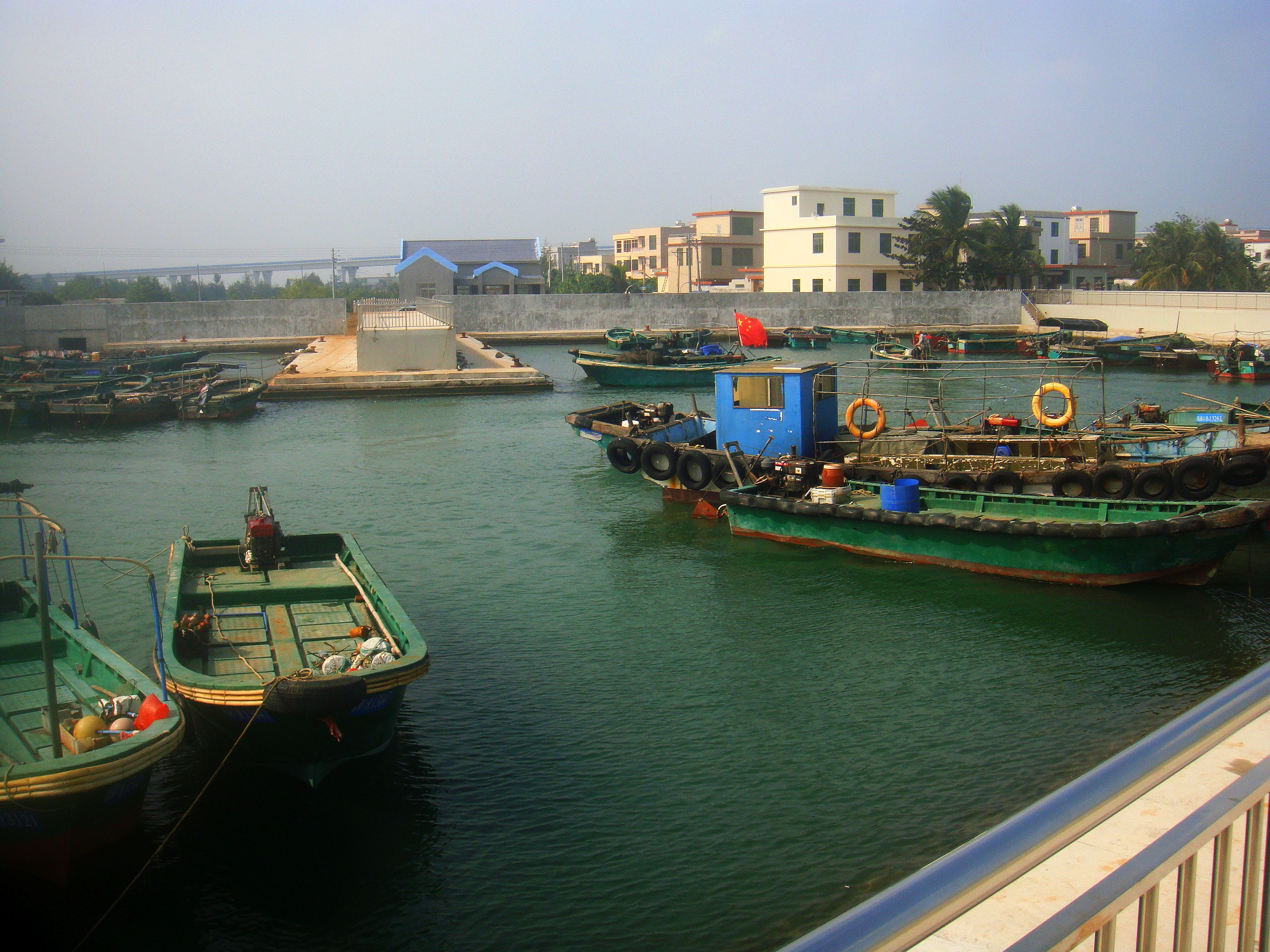
Harbor

A new harbor was built in response to Typhoon Rammasun in 2014 which destroyed numerous boats. It is a concrete harbor capable of mooring dozens of small fishing boats. It is located directly west of the ferry terminal.

=== Ferry terminal ===
The ferry terminal is located at the southeast of the island just to the east of the new harbor. There is a ferry service between Beigang Island and Puqian at the east side of the Dongzhai Harbor. The wooden boat has a capacity of 28 people.

== Residents ==
For generations, the residents of Beigang Island have caught fish for a living. In 2013, the income of the residents was approximately 15,000 RMB per capita. That is higher than that of rural villages, whose income was about 8,342 RMB at that time.

The residents of the village fish for a living. They are known to leave at night and return in the morning with their catch. Like the residents of Puqian, a town on the east side of Dongzhai Harbor, they also manage shellfish farms, mostly oysters, located off the coast.

== Puqian Bridge construction ==
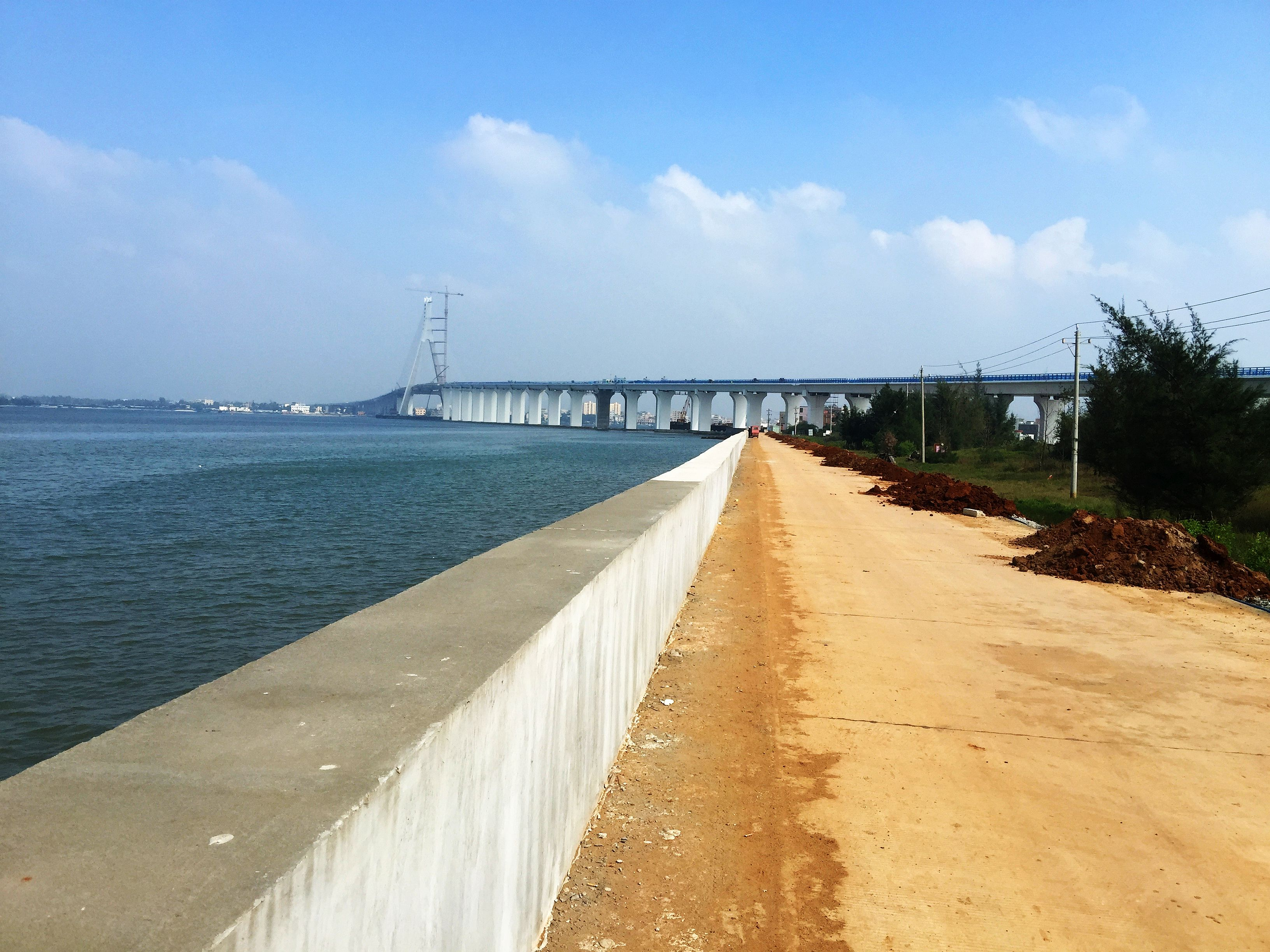
The seawall on the north coast with Puqian Bridge in the background

In 2018, the Puqian Bridge was built. Some of the abutments are situated on the northwest part of the island. To aid in construction, a service bridge was built along the north side of the Puqian Bridge to bring construction supplies from the west coast of the harbor to Beigang Island. The residents of the island have used this bridge to bring house construction materials to their island. Prior to the existence of this service bridge, supplies had to be ferried to the island at considerable expense. This bridge has caused an increase in house construction.
