= Dongzhai Harbor =

Harbor in Hainan, China

Dongzhai Harbor 东寨港
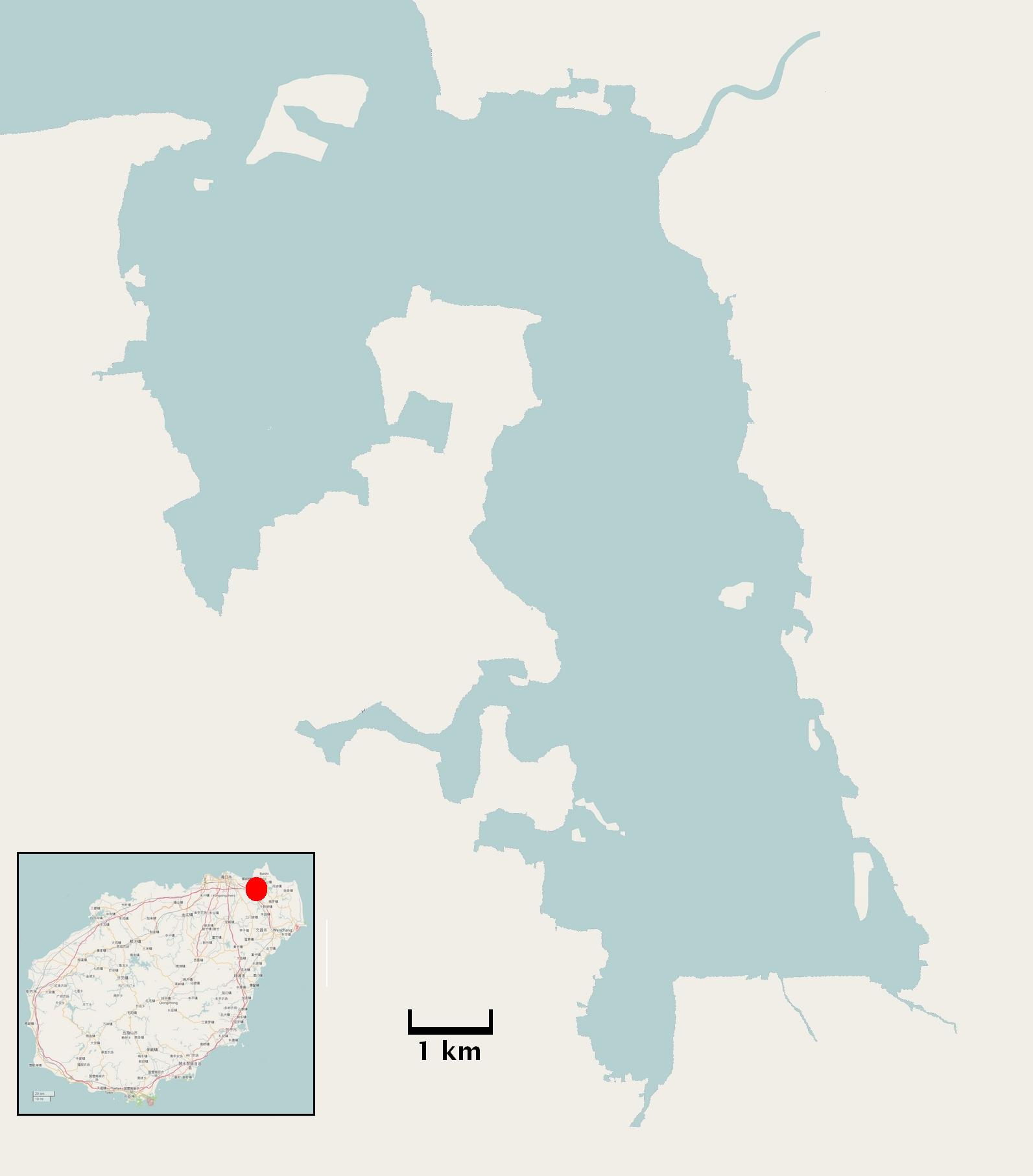

- Location within Hainan
- Location: Hainan Province, China
- Coordinates: 19.976895°N 110.599226°E
- Ocean/sea sources: Qiongzhou Strait
- Frozen: no

Dongzhai Harbor (Chinese: 东寨港; pinyin: Dōngzhài Gǎng) is located in the northeast of Hainan Province, China. This water body is bordered by Haikou's Meilan District at the west and Wenchang at the east.

== Etymology ==
Before the year 1605, there was a village in the area called Dongzhai. It was destroyed in an earthquake, and the harbor is named after it.

== History ==
Villages in this harbor were devastated subsidence from the 1605 Guangdong earthquake. Seventy-two villages sunk during that quake killing thousands of people. That earthquake helped to form the harbor. Beigang Island was part of the western mouth prior to that.

== Description ==
At the mouth of the harbor, there is an island called Beigang Island (literally "north port island"). It contains a few villages including Hou Xi Village. The middle of the harbour is occupied by a peninsula extending from the west coast.

Qu Quay is a village located on the northeastern coast of this peninsula. The town of Puqian is located at the mouth of the harbor on the east side.

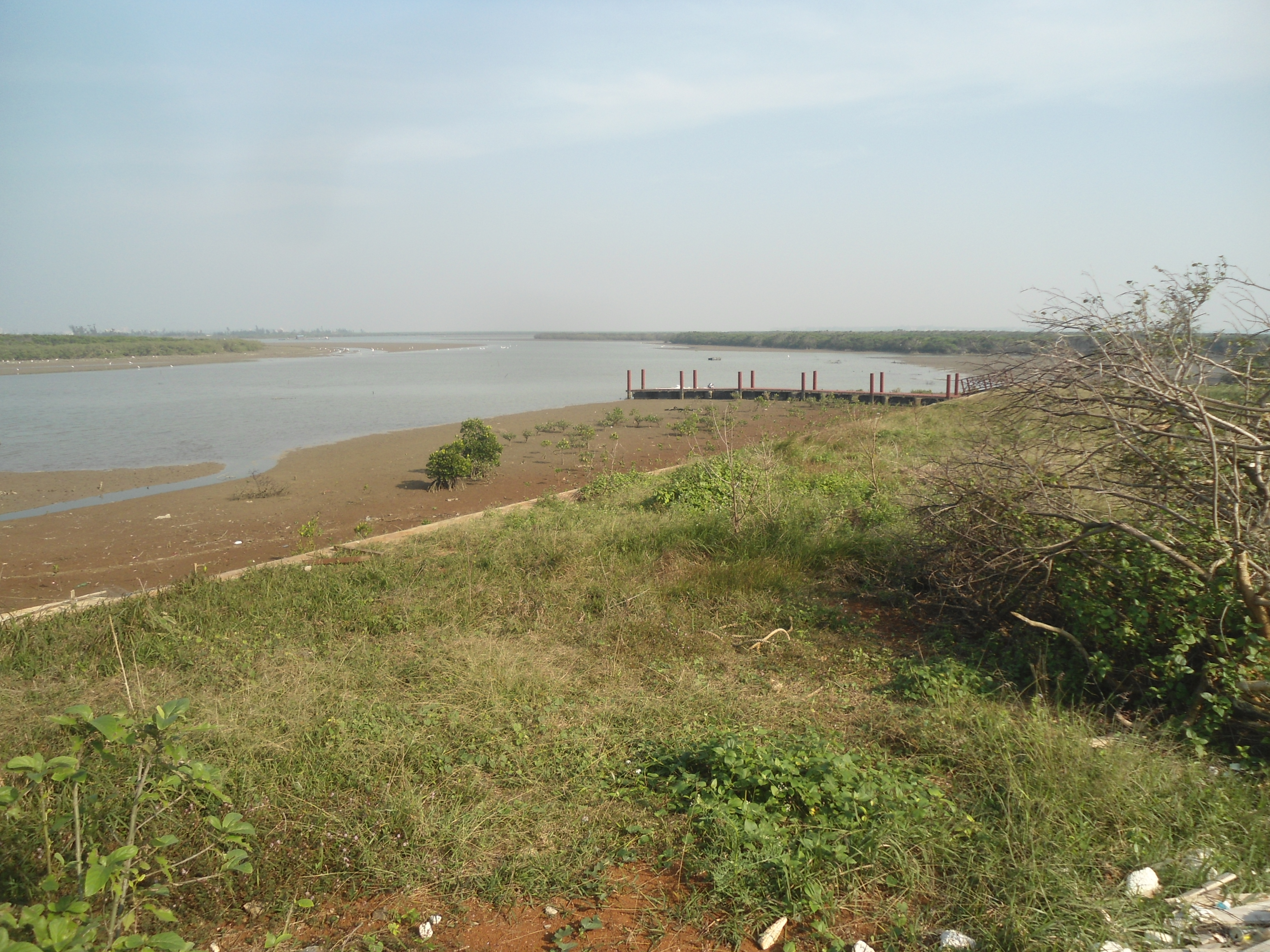
Dongzhai Harbor viewed from the northwest

Located within the harbour is the Dongzhai Port Nature Reserve.

Mangroves grow along much of the west and south coasts and are home to numerous bird species.

When the tide is low, villages that were sunk during the 1605 earthquake are revealed.

A main industry is the farming of oysters, which are extensively cultivated in this shallow harbor.

The Puqian Bridge is being constructed at the mouth of the harbor to connect the administrative divisions of Haikou at the west and Wenchang at the east.
