= Streptomyces tirandamycinicus =

Scientific classification
- Domain: Bacteria
- Kingdom: Bacillati
- Phylum: Actinomycetota
- Class: Actinomycetia
- Order: Streptomycetales
- Family: Streptomycetaceae
- Genus: Streptomyces
- Species: S. tirandamycinicus

Binomial name
- Streptomyces tirandamycinicus Huang et al. 2019

Type strain
- HNM0039

Species of bacterium

Streptomyces tirandamycinicus is a bacterium species from the genus Streptomyces which has been isolated from a marine sponge from the coast of Wenchang.
