= Bǽh-oe-tu =

Romanization system of the Hainanese language

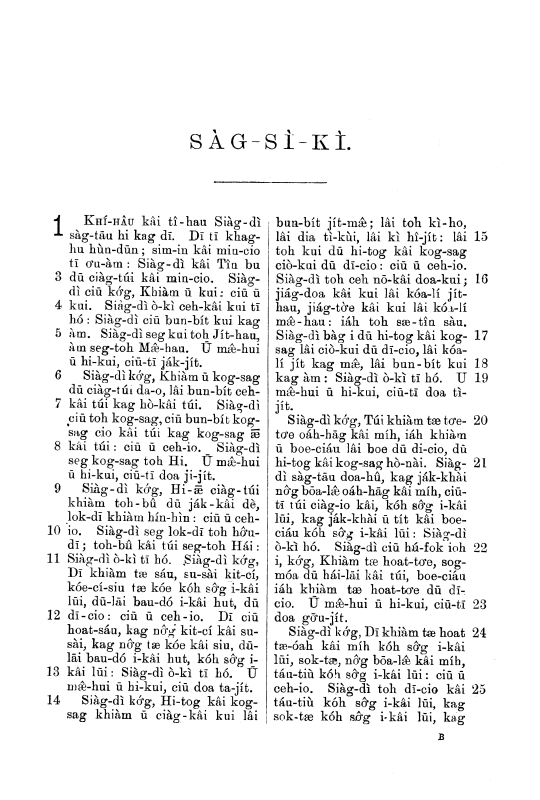
- The Book of Genesis in Bǽh-oe-tu, published by the Bible Society of Great Britain
- Script type: Latin alphabet (modified)
- Creator: Carl C. Jeremiassen
- Period: since c. 1890
- Languages: Haikou dialect of Hainanese

Related scripts
- Parent systems: Pe̍h-ōe-jī: Bǽh-oe-tu

Bǽh-oe-tu (abbr. BOT; Chinese: 白話字) is an orthography used to write the Haikou dialect of the Hainanese language. It was invented by Carl C. Jeremiassen, a Danish pioneer missionary in Fucheng (present-day Haikou) in 1881.

== Spelling schemes ==
=== Consonants ===
Bǽh-oe-tu (OT orthography)	Bǽh-oe-tu (NT orthography)	Example	Pronunciation
b	b	巴敗包	ʔɓ
m	m	妈母矛	m
f	f	抛派炮	f
v	v	我眉馬	v
t	t	三知聲	t
d	d	担待豆	ʔɗ
n	n	拿乃腦	n
l	l	拉利漏	l
c	ts	正鳥爭	ts
s	s	差猜抄	s
j	z	雅也熱	z
k	k	交官縣	k
g	ng	傲牙俄	ŋ
kh	kh	摳科區	x
h	h	偷听花	h

=== Vowels ===
Bǽh-oe-tu (OT orthography)	Bǽh-oe-tu (NT orthography)	Example	Pronunciation
a	a	霸拿雅	a
ai	ai	板代在	ai
au	au	包豆九	au
am	am	斬參甘	am
ag	ang	房黨工	aŋ
ab	ap	十恰合	ap̚
ak	ak	北毒角	ak̚
ah	ah	...	aʔ
ia	ia	兵鼎兄	ia
iau	iau	表條交	iau
iam	iam	甜針鹹	iam
iag	iang	常章江	iaŋ
iab	iap	諜接葉	iap̚
iak	iak	鹿一菊	iak̚
iah	iah	...	iaʔ
oa	oa	般大換	ua
oai	oai	帥乖	uai
oag	oang	盤端川	uaŋ
oak	oak	末奪括	uak̚
oah	oah	...	uaʔ
æ	æ	病茶井	ɛ
æh	æh	...	ɛʔ
e	e	拔處爺	e
eg	eng	冰亭清	eŋ
ek	ek	德值克	ek̚
eh	eh	...	eʔ
oe	oe	飛	ue
oeh	oeh	...	ueʔ
o͘	o͘	烏	ɔ
o	o	哥	o
o͘e	o͘e	配	ɔe
o͘i	o͘i	每帝街	ɔi
o͘u	o͘u	符肚古	ɔu
o͘m	o͘m	蘸陷拱	ɔm
o͘g	o͘ng	蒙登生	ɔŋ
o͘b	o͘p	漉	ɔp̚
o͘k	o͘k	博澤惡	ɔk̚
o͘h	o͘h	...	ɔʔ
io	io	票張橋	io
io͘g	io͘ng	...	iɔŋ
io͘k	io͘k	竹爵約	iɔk̚
io͘h	io͘h	...	iɔʔ
i	i	比試氣	i
iu	iu	謬守求	iu
im	im	心任禁	im
in	in	賓年認	in
ib	ip	立入及	ip̚
it	it	筆實吉	it̚
ih	ih	...	iʔ
u	u	部女去	u
ui	ui	肥水鬼	ui
un	un	分船雲	un
og	ong	碰董共	oŋ
ut	ut	佛律骨	ut̚
ok	ok	福督足	ok̚
oh	oh	...	oʔ
...	...	...	...
...	...	...	...

=== Tones ===
Tonal types	Tone numeral	Tone Marks (OT orthography)	Tone Marks (NT orthography)	Example
陰平 yin ping	23	none	none	安天
陽平 yang ping	21	◌̂	◌̂	平人
上聲 shang sheng	213	◌́	◌́	古女
陰去 yin qu	35	◌̀	◌̀	正變
陽去 yang qu	33	◌̄	◌̄	謝厚
陰入 yin ru	5	none (-b/-t/-k/-h)	none (-p/-t/-k/-h)	急七
陽入 yang ru	3	◌́ (-b/-t/-k/-h)	◌́ (-p/-t/-k/-h)	六十

In Bǽh-oe-tu, Chinese characters pronounced with the tone chang ru (長入, 55) should be marked with the symbol yin ru (陰入, 5). In Haikou dialect, some Chinese characters that should originally be pronounced as yin ru have lost their codas and the pronunciation is elongated. This newly generated tone is called chang ru by scholars.

== Sample texts from Hainanese Bibles ==
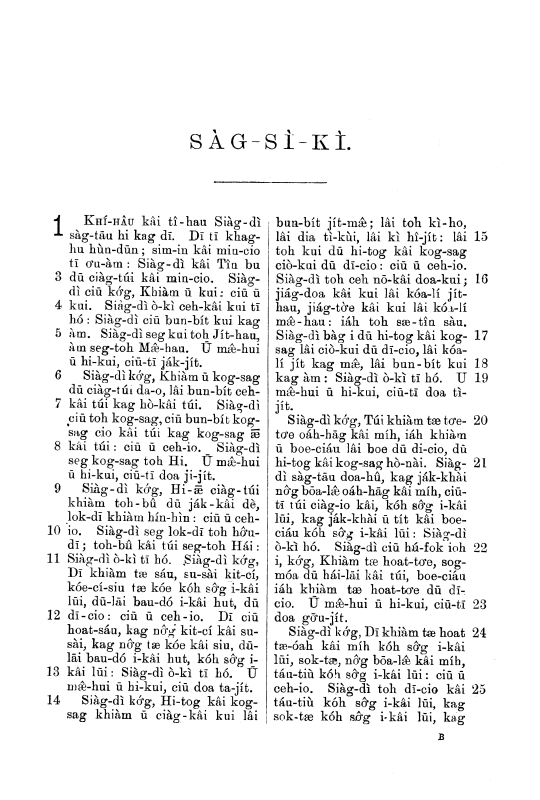

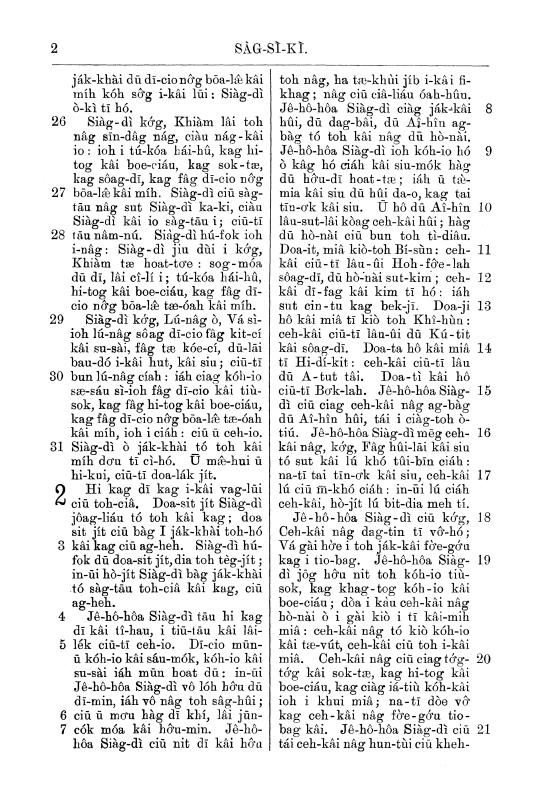

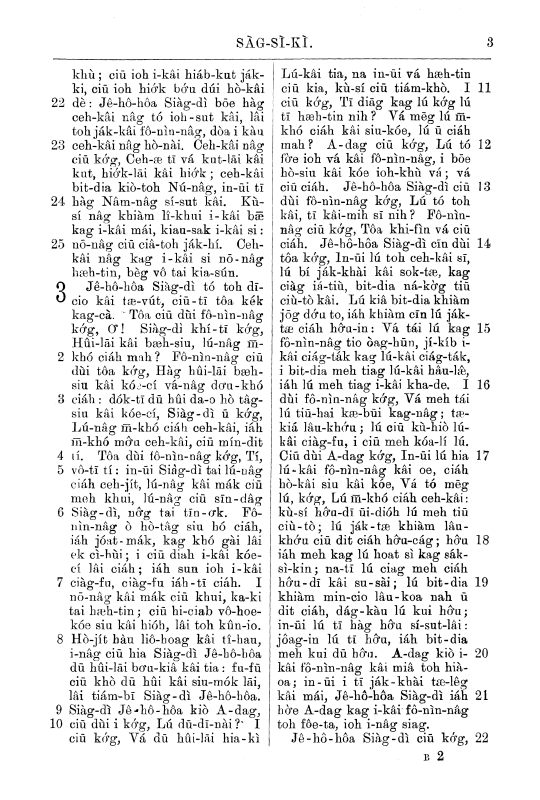

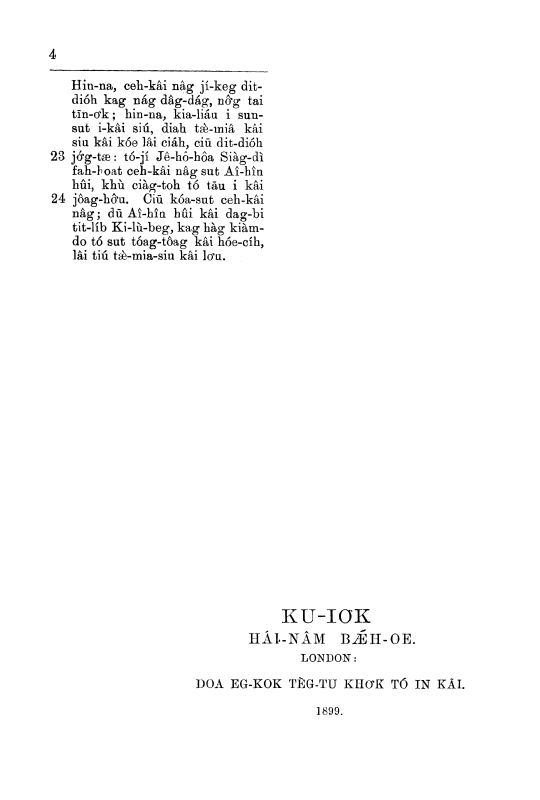

== See also ==
- Hainanese Transliteration Scheme (海南话拼音方案)
