= Haikou dialect =

Min Chinese dialect of Hainan, China

Haikou
- 海口話
- Pronunciation: [hai˨˩˧ xau˨˩˧ ue˨˧]
- Native to: Southern China
- Region: Haikou, Hainan
- Language family: Sino-Tibetan: Sinitic; Chinese; Min; Coastal Min; Southern Min?; Qiong–Lei; Hainanese; Haikou
- Early forms: Proto-Sino-Tibetan: Old Chinese (Note: Min is believed to have split from Old Chinese, rather than Middle Chinese like other varieties of Chinese.); Proto-Min
- Writing system: Bǽh-oe-tu

Language codes
- ISO 639-3: –
- Glottolog: hain1237
- Linguasphere: 79-AAA-ked

The Haikou dialect is a topolect of Chinese and a subvariety of Hainanese spoken in Haikou, the capital of the Hainan province and island of China.

== Phonology ==
The Haikou dialect has the following initials:

		Labial	Dental	Sibilant	Velar	Glottal
Stop / Affricate	voiceless		t	ts	k	ʔ
Stop / Affricate	voiced implosive	ɓ	ɗ			
Nasal		m	n		ŋ	
Fricative	voiceless	f		s	x	h
Fricative	voiced	v		z		
Lateral			l			

The finals are:

Vocalic codas			Nasal codas			Stop codas		
a	ai	au	am		aŋ	ap		ak
ia		iau	iam		iaŋ	iap		iak
ua	uai				uaŋ			uak
ɛ	e				eŋ			ek
ue								
o	ɔi	ɔu	ɔm		ɔŋ	ɔp		ɔk
io					iɔŋ			iɔk
i		iu	im	in		ip	it	
u	ui			un	oŋ		uk	ok

There are also two syllabic nasals, /m̩/ and /ŋ̍/.

The tone categories (described using Chao tone letters) are:

	level	rising	departing	entering
upper	˨˦	˨˩˧	˧˥	˥
lower	˨˩	˧		˧
lower	˨˩	ʔ˥		˧

== See also ==
- Hainan Romanized

== Sources ==
- Chen, Hongmai (1996), Hǎikǒu fāngyán cídiǎn 海口方言詞典 [Haikou dialect dictionary], Great Dictionary of Modern Chinese Dialects, vol. 16, Nanjing: Jiangsu Education Press, ISBN 978-7-5343-2886-2.
- Yan, Margaret Mian (2006), Introduction to Chinese Dialectology, LINCOM Europa, ISBN 978-3-89586-629-6.
