= Puqian =

Puqian 铺前镇
- Town

Chinese transcription(s)
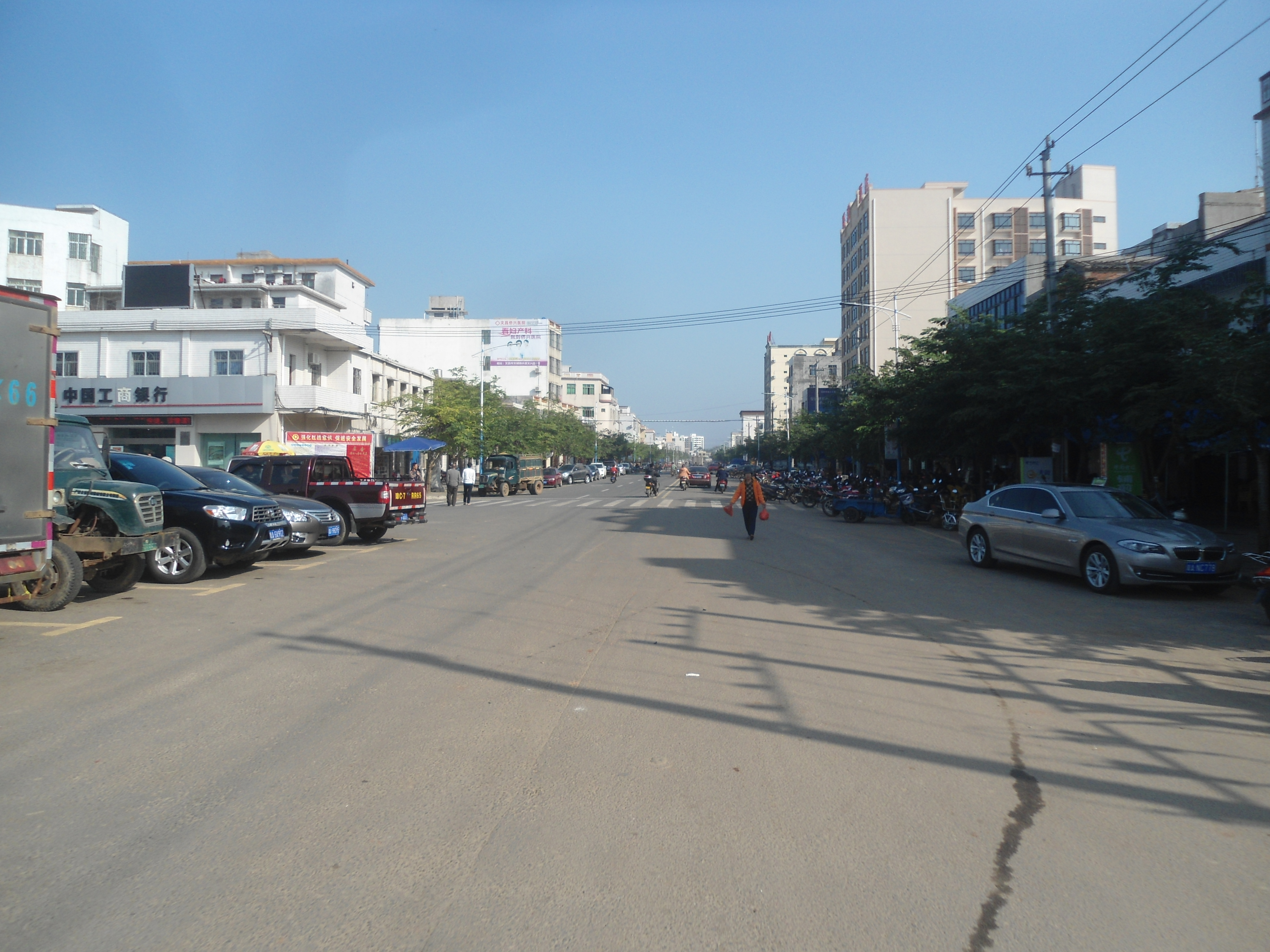
- The main road

- Location in Hainan
- Coordinates: 20°1′44″N 110°34′37″E
- Country: China
- Province: Hainan
- Time zone: UTC+8 (China Standard Time)

Puqian (Chinese: 铺前镇; HTS: Fou^{1}tai^{1}dian^{5}) is a port town on the eastern shore of Dongzhai Harbor in Wenchang, Hainan province, China.

== Old street ==
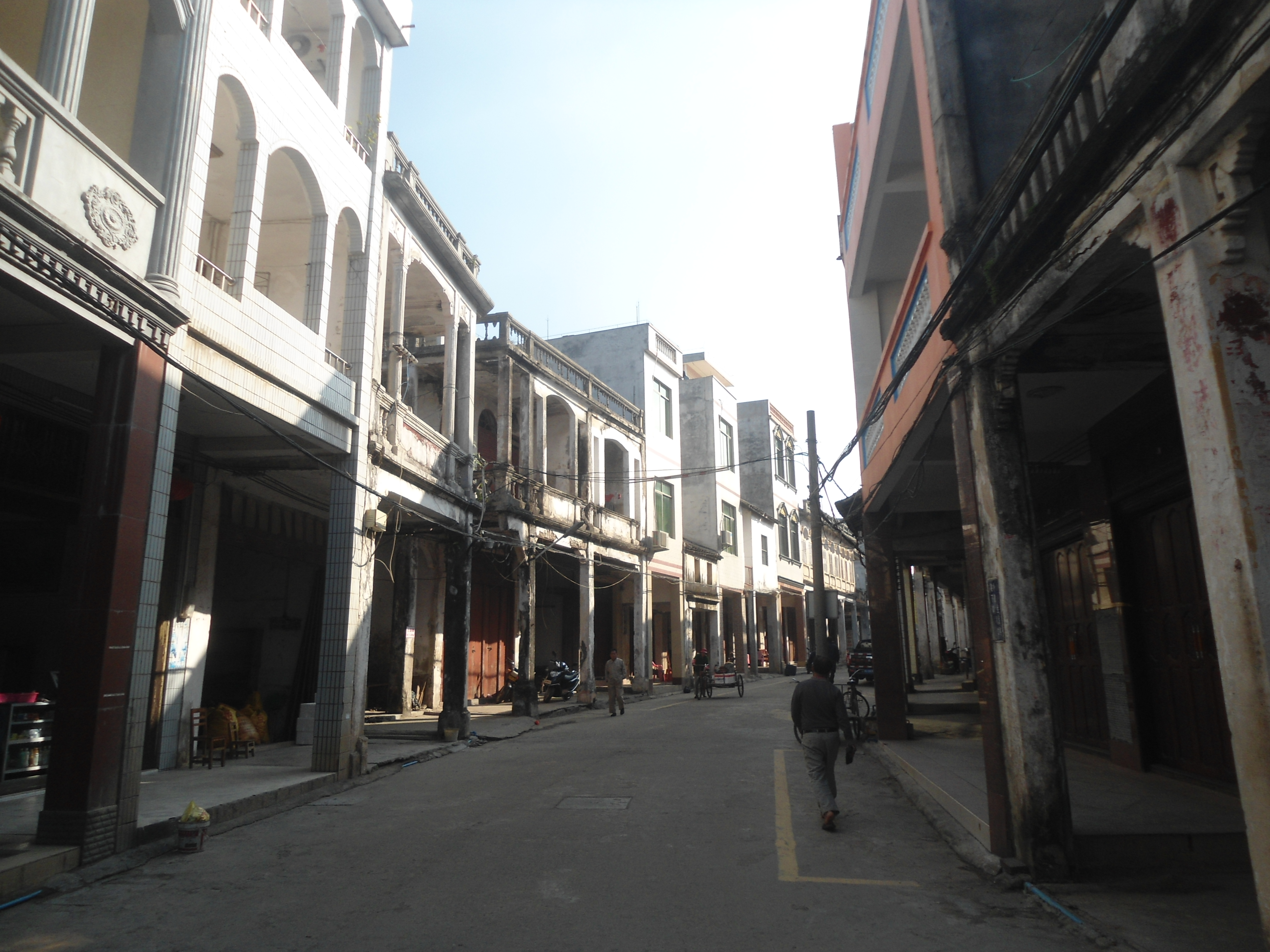
Tong lau buildings

A road running from the port at the west to the southernmost point of the main road is lined with tong lau buildings similar in style to those of Haikou's Bo'ai Road area and those on Wennan Old Street in Wencheng Town, Wenchang. While the Bo'ai Road area buildings are in the process of being restored, and Wennan Old Street buildings have been completely restored, the buildings on Puqian's old street are dilapidated, some of which have been condemned or structurally collapsed inside.

== Access ==
Prior to 2019, access from Haikou was by road around Dongzhai Harbor, or by ferry boat from a small peninsula within the harbor. From 2019 onward, the Puqian Bridge, which crosses the mouth of the harbor provides more direct access to Haikou. Puqian still has ferry service to the nearby Beigang Island.
