= Qinglan Bridge =

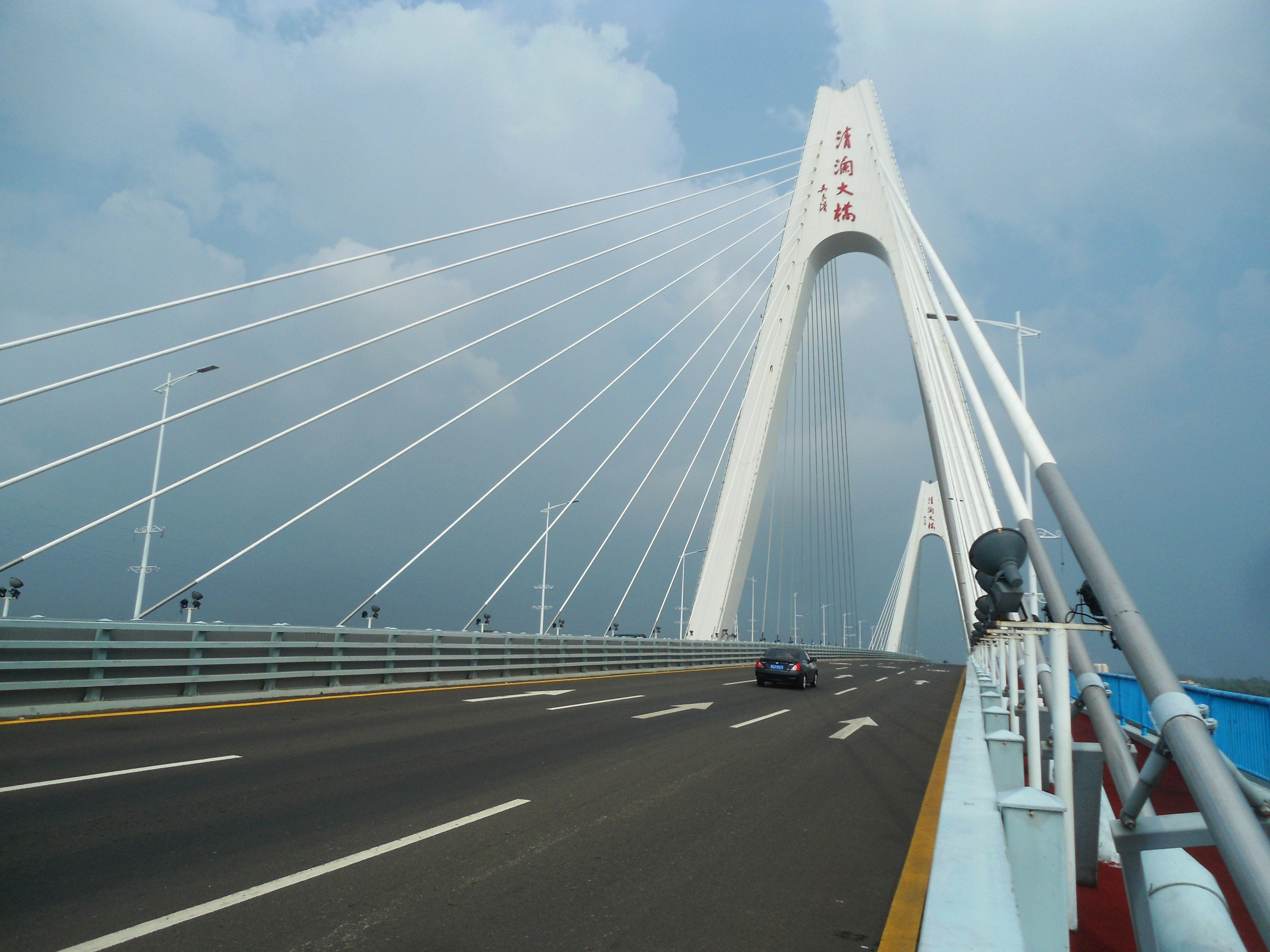
- Coordinates: 19.5741°N 110.8221°E
- Crosses: Qinglan Bay
- Locale: Wenchang, Hainan, China

Characteristics
- Design: Cable-stayed bridge
- Total length: 1,828 metres (5,997 ft)
- Width: 34 metres (112 ft)

History
- Opened: 2012

Location
- Interactive map of Qinglan Bridge

The Qinglan Bridge (Chinese: 清澜大桥) is a bridge in Wenchang, Hainan, China. It connects Qinglan Town and Dongjiao Town by crossing over the Qinglan Bay.

It is 1,828 metres (5,997 ft) long and 34 metres (112 ft) wide. This cable-stayed bridge has two A-shaped towers that are 105.81 meters high. It has 6 lanes for automobile traffic and a 2-metre side lane at the edges for small vehicles and pedestrians. The speed limit is 80 km/h.

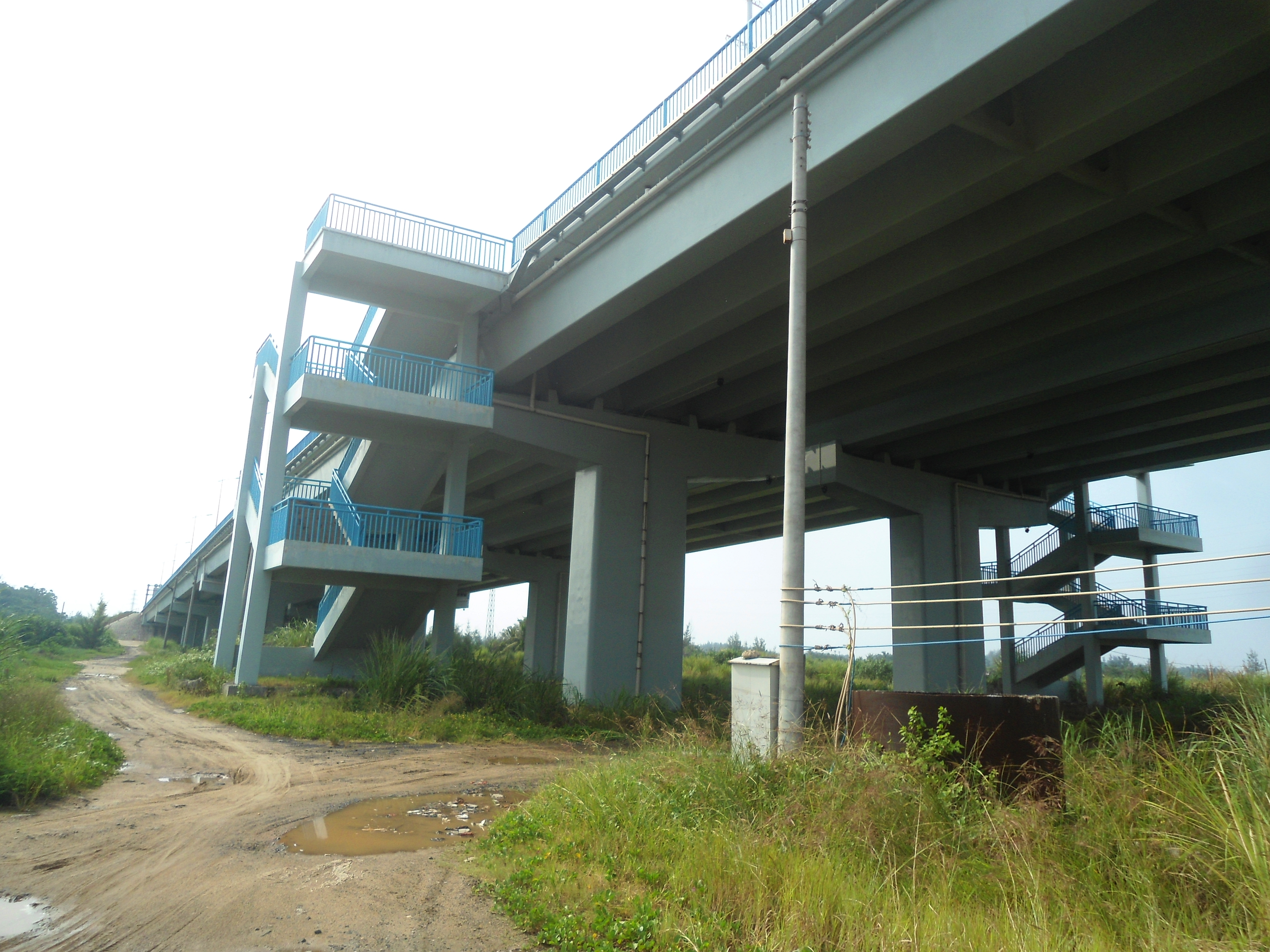
Abutment and stair access on southwest side

The total investment was 595 million RMB.

The bridge will also be used for transportation related to the Wenchang Satellite Launch Center. It is considered the most earthquake-resistant bridge in China, being able to handle one at a magnitude of 8.5 on the Richter scale.
