= Hainan College of Foreign Studies =

Coordinates: 19.60343°N 110.76483°E

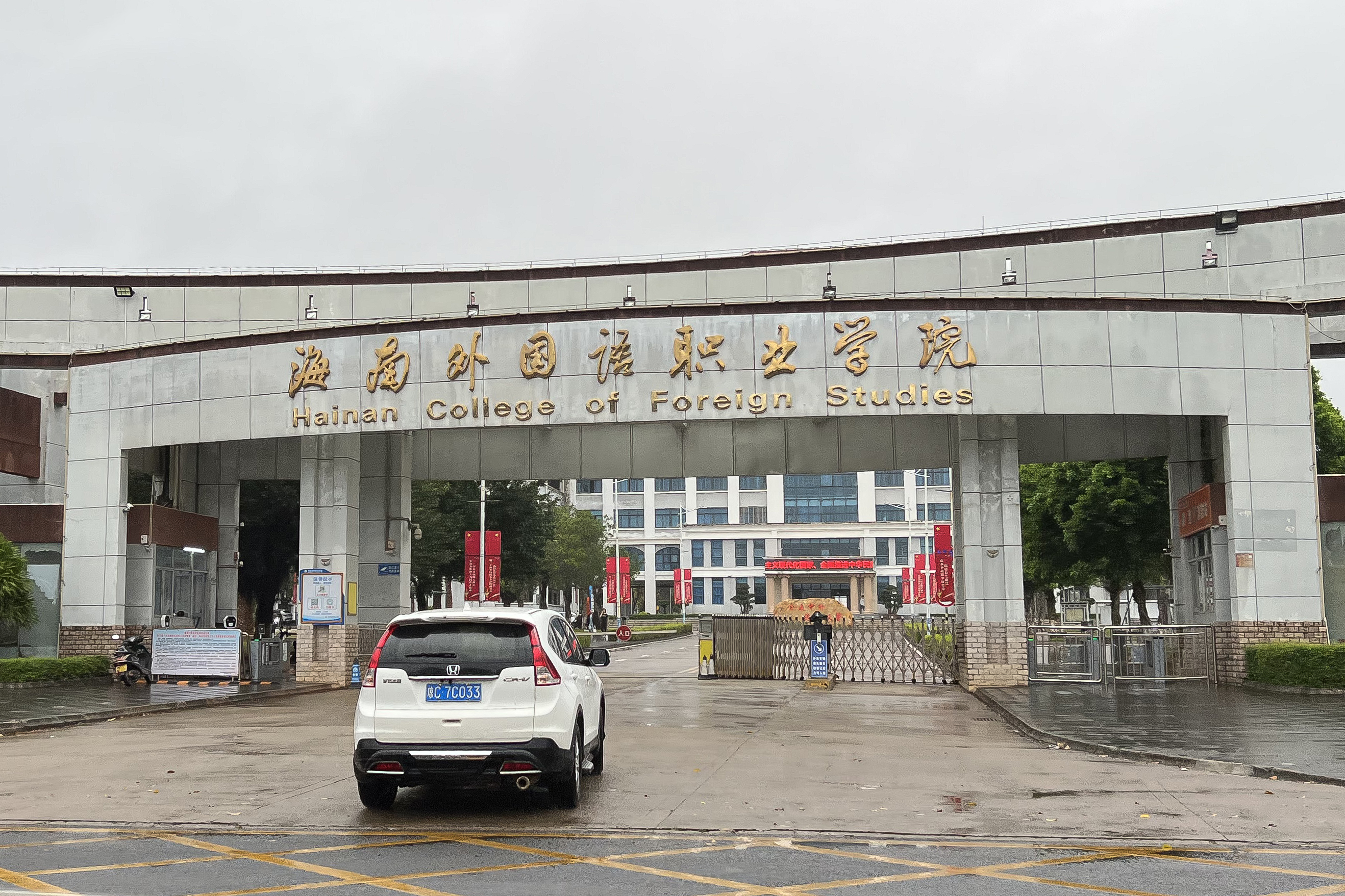
- Simplified Chinese: 海南外国语职业学院
- Traditional Chinese: 海南外國語職業學院
- Literal meaning: Hainan Foreign Language Vocational College
Transcriptions
Standard Mandarin
- Hanyu Pinyin: Hǎinán Wàiguóyǔ Zhíyè Xuéyuàn

Hainan College of Foreign Studies (HNCFS; Chinese: 海南外国语职业学院; lit. 'Hainan Foreign Language Vocational College') is a tertiary institution in Wenchang, Hainan, China.

As of 2020 it has about 300 employees, including 20 non-Chinese teachers, and 5,000 students. The institution was established in 1947 and began admitting non-Chinese students in 2004.
