= Jiangsu Education Press =

Chinese state publisher

Jiangsu Education Press (Chinese: 江苏教育出版社), or Jiangsu Education Publishing House is a publishing company in Nanjing, China. Founded in 1984, it largely publishes textbooks, teaching materials, and monographs. Its editorial departments include the humanities, sciences, and general education. By 1994, it had released more than 2,000 books, with total sales exceeding 700 million copies.
