= Carl C. Jeremiassen =

Danish sea captain

Chinese name
- Chinese: 冶基善
Transcriptions
Standard Mandarin
- Hanyu Pinyin: Yě Jīshàn
Southern Min
- Hokkien POJ: Iá Ki-siān
Northern Min
- Jian'ou Romanized: Iǎ Gí-sīng

Carl C. Jeremiassen (Chinese: 冶基善; pinyin: Yě Jīshàn; 1847–1901) was a Danish sea captain. He is known today as the first Protestant missionary to Hainan island and the translator of portions of the Old and New Testament into the Hainanese language.

== Biography ==
Jeremiassen for China in 1868 to work for the Canton Customs Service of the Qing Government and hunt down pirates and smugglers in the South China Sea. After having cleared the area for other pirates, he did a two-year apprenticeship in Canton Hospital and learned enough about medicine to enable him to commence medical work in later years.

In 1881 he settled down on the island of Hainan, where he worked as an independent missionary and set up a medical dispensary to help the people living on the island.

He bought Wu clan shrine and decorated it to become a church from his own money, which he had accumulated during his stay there. The same year as Jeremiassen arrived in Hainan, he mapped the island and caused quite a stir by his travels, he was described by the natives as a "red-haired giant". He wrote several treatises on the native language and culture and built many chapels on the island.

In 1886 Dr. H. M. McCandliss and Carl Jeremiassen "established a hospital in Haikou, the first Western hospital in Hainan Island". In 1887 an epidemic of malaria broke out. Jeremiassen began to treat patients with quinine and all the patients under his care were restored to health.

In 1901, he disappeared and was rumored by the Chinese on the island to be drowned in the sea. According to the natives would he be gone up on a volcano. However, according to missionary sources, Jeremiassen had died from typhoid whilst travelling on the island.

Jeremiassen's life story was handed over on August 3, 1923, to Henning Haslund-Christensen and also to his old shipmate John McGregor residing in Shanghai.
