= Dongzhai Port Nature Reserve =

Natural reserve in Haikou, Hainan, China

- IUCN category V (protected landscape/seascape)
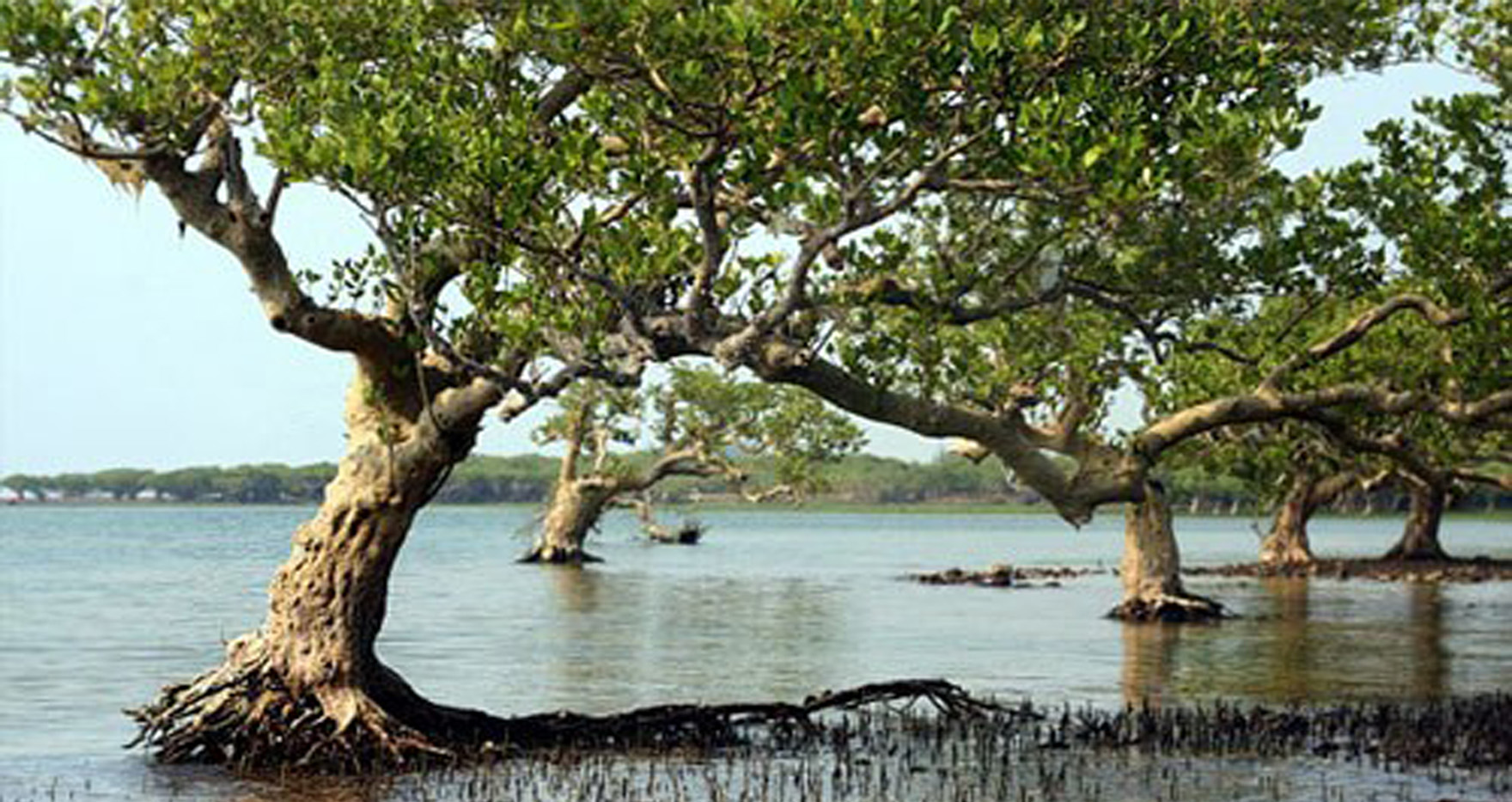
- Haikou's Dongzhai Harbour Mangrove Forest

- Location within Hainan
- Location: Meilan District, Haikou City Hainan Island, China
- Coordinates: 19.98939°N 110.55246°E
- Area: 2,500 hectares (6,200 acres)
- Established: 1986

Dongzhai Port Nature Reserve
- Traditional Chinese: 東寨港紅樹林自然保護
- Simplified Chinese: 东寨港红树林自然保护区
Transcriptions
Standard Mandarin
- Hanyu Pinyin: Dōngzhài Gǎng Hóngshùlín Zìránbǎohùqū

Dongzhai Port Nature Reserve, also called the Hainan Dongzhai Bay National Nature Reserve, Dongzhai Harbor Mangrove, and Dongzhai Harbor Mangrove Natural Reserve Area, is located within Dongzhai Harbor, in the area of Yanfeng Town, Meilan District, Haikou, Hainan, China. It has an area of 2,500 hectares (6,200 acres) and includes six rivers. The coastline is very irregular and includes a number of bays and tidewater gullies. The mangrove forest on the south coast provides a habitat for birds and other wildlife.

The Nature Reserve has been placed on the UNESCO World Heritage Sites Tentative List.

There are 36 species of mangrove plants in 19 families. The reserve is also home to around 214 species of birds, 115 molluscs species, 160 species of fish, as well as shrimp, crabs and various crustaceans. Numerous species of waterfowl spend the winter in this reserve, including Australian migratory birds.
