= 1605 Guangdong earthquake =

Significant earthquake Guangdong province China 13 July 1605

- Location within Guangdong
- Local date: 13 July 1605
- Magnitude: M_{s} 7.5
- Epicenter: 19.9°N 110.5°E
- Max. intensity: MMI X (Extreme)
- Casualties: thousands

The 1605 Qiongshan earthquake (Chinese: 瓊山地震) occurred on 13 July (33rd year of reign of Emperor Wanli, May 28 in the Chinese lunar calendar) that struck Hainan and the adjacent Guangdong province in China with an estimated magnitude of 7.5 M_{s} with a maximum felt intensity of X (Extreme) on the Modified Mercalli intensity scale. It caused widespread damage, including the subsidence of large areas of farmland, swamping many villages and several thousand people were killed.

According to the Chinese records about the event, in the reign of the Wanli Emperor, "there was a thunderous sound, the public office collapsed and the houses collapsed, and thousands of the dead were crushed in the county" and "the corpse is covered in pillows, bloody, touches the heart, and spit in the sky.
