= Wenchang =

Wenchang 文昌市
- County-level & Sub-prefectural city
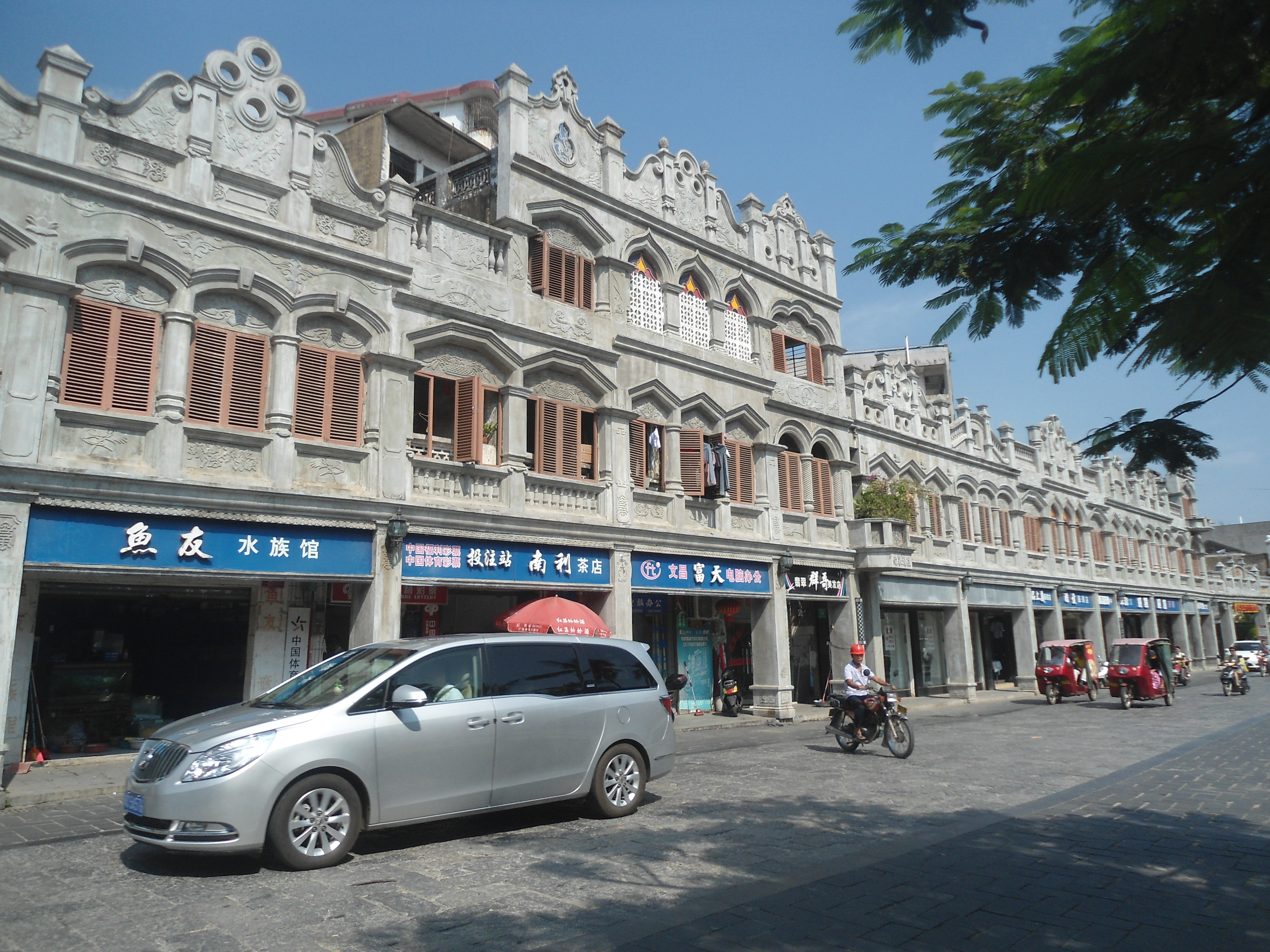
- Wennan Old Street

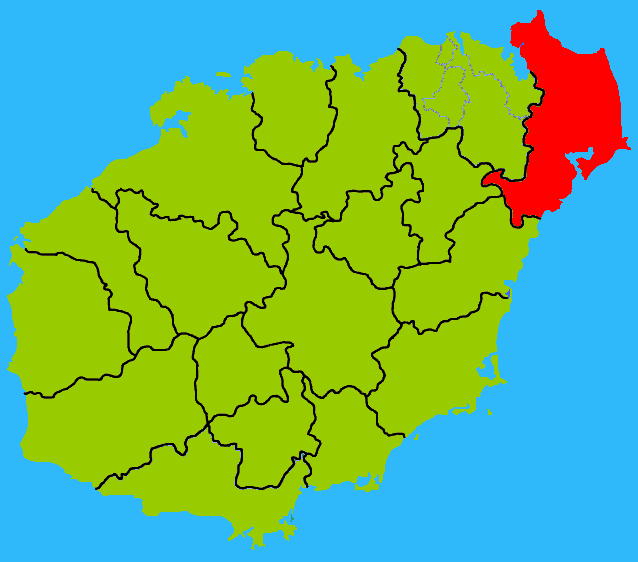
- Wenchang City jurisdiction in Hainan

- Location of the city center in Hainan
- Coordinates (Wenchang Park): 19°37′01″N 110°45′18″E
- Country: People's Republic of China
- Province: Hainan

Area
  - County-level & Sub-prefectural city: 2,403 km^{2} (928 sq mi)

Population (2010)
  - County-level & Sub-prefectural city: 537,428
  - Density: 223.6/km^{2} (579.2/sq mi)
  - Metro: 115,000
- Time zone: UTC+8 (China standard time)
- Postal code: 571300
- Area code: 0898
- Website: http://www.wenchang.gov.cn

Wenchang (Chinese: 文昌; pinyin: Wénchāng; HTS: Bun^{2}sio^{1}; postal: Mencheong) is a county-level city in the northeast of Hainan Island in China. Covering an area of 2,403 square kilometres (928 sq mi), the city has a coastline of 207 kilometres (129 mi), and is divided into 17 towns.

The city is a major target for typhoons in the northwestern Pacific, and experiences the most frequent and severe typhoon-induced storm surges in the South China Sea. The city is a major ancestral home of Chinese diaspora, with the local dish Wenchang chicken as an origin of Hainanese chicken rice in Southeast Asia. Since 2016, the city has also been home to China’s newest spaceport.

== History ==
Wenchang was elevated from a county to a city on November 7, 1995. Its population was recorded as 86,551 in 1999, with an estimated increase to 115,000 by 2006. Maps published by the Republic of China in Taiwan still depict Wenchang as a county within its Guangdong province.

In 2016, Wenchang Space Launch Site was put in use, which is China's latest spaceport.

== Geography ==
Located in the northeastern part of Hainan, Boon Siou/Wenchang covers a total area of 2,403 square kilometres (928 sq mi). The east side has a long coastline along the South China Sea while the west borders Dongzhai Harbor, Haikou's Meilan District, Qionghai, and Ding'an County. The land is mostly hilly and contains both forest and agricultural areas. The entire area is populated with countless towns, farms, and villages.

=== Wencheng Town ===
Location of Wencheng Town within Wenchang

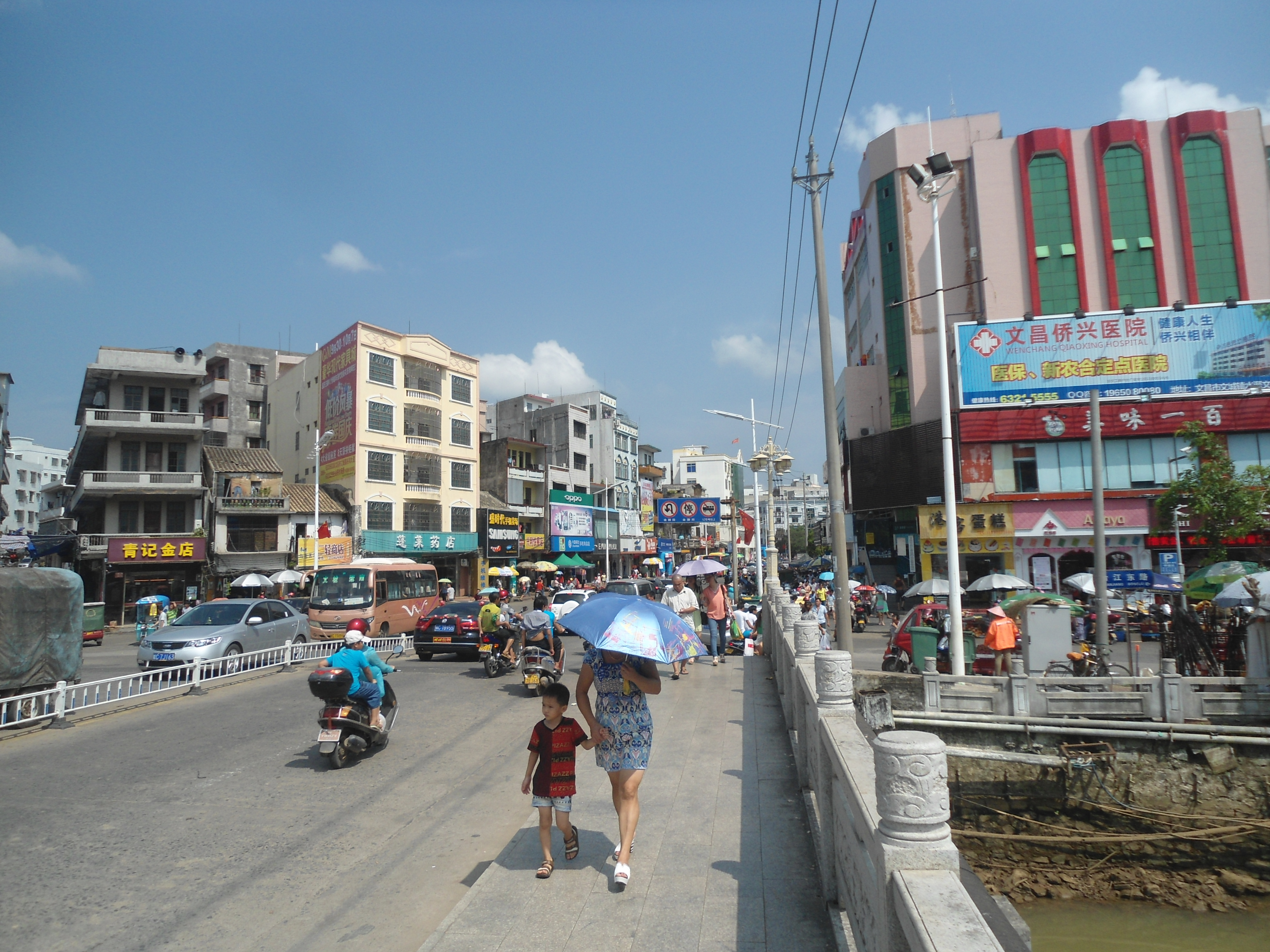
Downtown

Wencheng Town is located in the south of Wenchang, 63 kilometres (39 mi) southeast of the provincial capital, Haikou. There is a central park and covered market downtown. Also located downtown is Boon Siou/Wenchang Middle School a large, modern campus. A new hospital is under construction on the outskirts.

The centre of the town is at near sea level with a canal running between one of the main streets and Wennan Old Street. This area has been subject severe flooding a number of times in the past. Another main road runs from the centre, uphill to the south. This road leads to Yilong Bay. Directly to the north of the town centre lies a fairly affluent hilltop community occupied by numerous housing compounds for retired military and other government workers.

==== Wennan Old Street ====
Wennan Old Street is a visitor attraction located in the heart of the town. The street is lined with fully restored tong lau buildings similar to those in Haikou's Bo'ai Road area (now being restored) as well as the old street in Puqian (unrestored and dilapidated).

=== Other towns ===
- Baoluo (抱罗镇)
- Changsa (昌洒镇)
- Chongxing (重兴镇)
- Dongge (东阁镇)

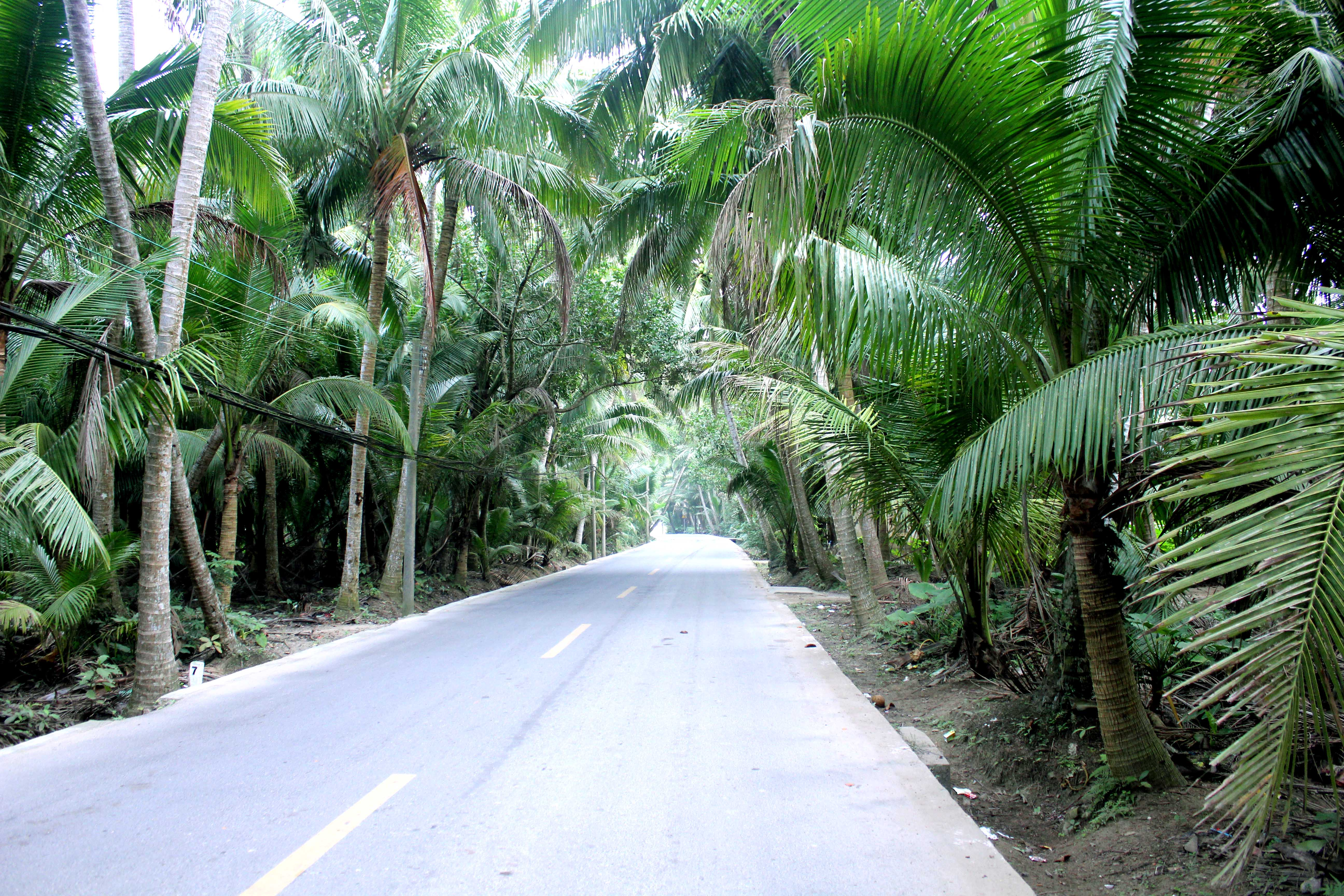
Dongjiao

- Dongjiao (东郊镇) - literally "east suburb" and known as "coconut town", is located east of Wencheng Town over the Qinglan Bridge. This town is coastal, and is forested mainly with coconut trees. Small industries for processing coconut products exist there.
- Donglu (东路镇)
- Fengpo (冯坡镇)
- Huiwen (会文镇)
- Jinshan (锦山镇)
- Longlou (龙楼镇)
- Penglai (蓬莱镇)
- Puqian (铺前镇) - a coastal town located in the northern part of Wenchang situated on the eastern shore of Dongzhai Harbor
- Tanniu (潭牛镇)
- Wengtian (翁田镇) - a coastal town located in the northeast of Wenchang, 53 kilometres away from Wencheng Town. There are two ports: Baohu Port and Hulu Port.
- Wenjiao (文教镇)

== Climate ==
Wenchang has a tropical monsoon climate (Köppen Am).

Climate data for Wenchang, elevation 22 m (72 ft), (1991–2020 normals, extremes 1981–present)
Month	Jan	Feb	Mar	Apr	May	Jun	Jul	Aug	Sep	Oct	Nov	Dec	Year
Record high °C (°F)	29.6 (85.3)	31.5 (88.7)	31.9 (89.4)	35.5 (95.9)	36.8 (98.2)	37.7 (99.9)	38.7 (101.7)	36.8 (98.2)	36.0 (96.8)	36.2 (97.2)	32.1 (89.8)	30.0 (86.0)	38.7 (101.7)
Mean daily maximum °C (°F)	22.5 (72.5)	23.7 (74.7)	26.4 (79.5)	29.3 (84.7)	31.8 (89.2)	32.7 (90.9)	32.8 (91.0)	32.6 (90.7)	31.5 (88.7)	29.4 (84.9)	26.7 (80.1)	23.4 (74.1)	28.6 (83.4)
Daily mean °C (°F)	18.7 (65.7)	20.0 (68.0)	22.8 (73.0)	25.6 (78.1)	27.7 (81.9)	28.7 (83.7)	28.6 (83.5)	28.1 (82.6)	27.2 (81.0)	25.4 (77.7)	23.0 (73.4)	19.8 (67.6)	24.6 (76.4)
Mean daily minimum °C (°F)	16.0 (60.8)	17.5 (63.5)	20.4 (68.7)	23.2 (73.8)	24.9 (76.8)	25.9 (78.6)	25.8 (78.4)	25.2 (77.4)	24.4 (75.9)	22.6 (72.7)	20.3 (68.5)	17.2 (63.0)	22.0 (71.5)
Record low °C (°F)	4.3 (39.7)	6.7 (44.1)	6.4 (43.5)	14.8 (58.6)	15.1 (59.2)	19.7 (67.5)	21.0 (69.8)	21.6 (70.9)	18.3 (64.9)	13.0 (55.4)	9.0 (48.2)	4.2 (39.6)	4.2 (39.6)
Average precipitation mm (inches)	36.4 (1.43)	46.4 (1.83)	56.4 (2.22)	107.5 (4.23)	220.1 (8.67)	168.6 (6.64)	209.9 (8.26)	303.4 (11.94)	354.2 (13.94)	333.3 (13.12)	78.9 (3.11)	60.1 (2.37)	1,975.2 (77.76)
Average precipitation days (≥ 0.1 mm)	11.5	10.8	10.2	11.0	15.2	13.2	14.2	17.2	18.0	13.6	12.2	11.5	158.6
Average relative humidity (%)	86	87	86	85	84	84	83	85	85	83	83	84	85
Mean monthly sunshine hours	89.9	92.3	128.4	166.9	203.6	213.5	227.5	199.2	165.3	156.2	112.7	86.7	1,842.2
Percentage possible sunshine	26	28	34	44	50	54	56	51	45	43	34	26	41
Source: China Meteorological Administration all-time April Record highall-time Jun high

== Culture ==
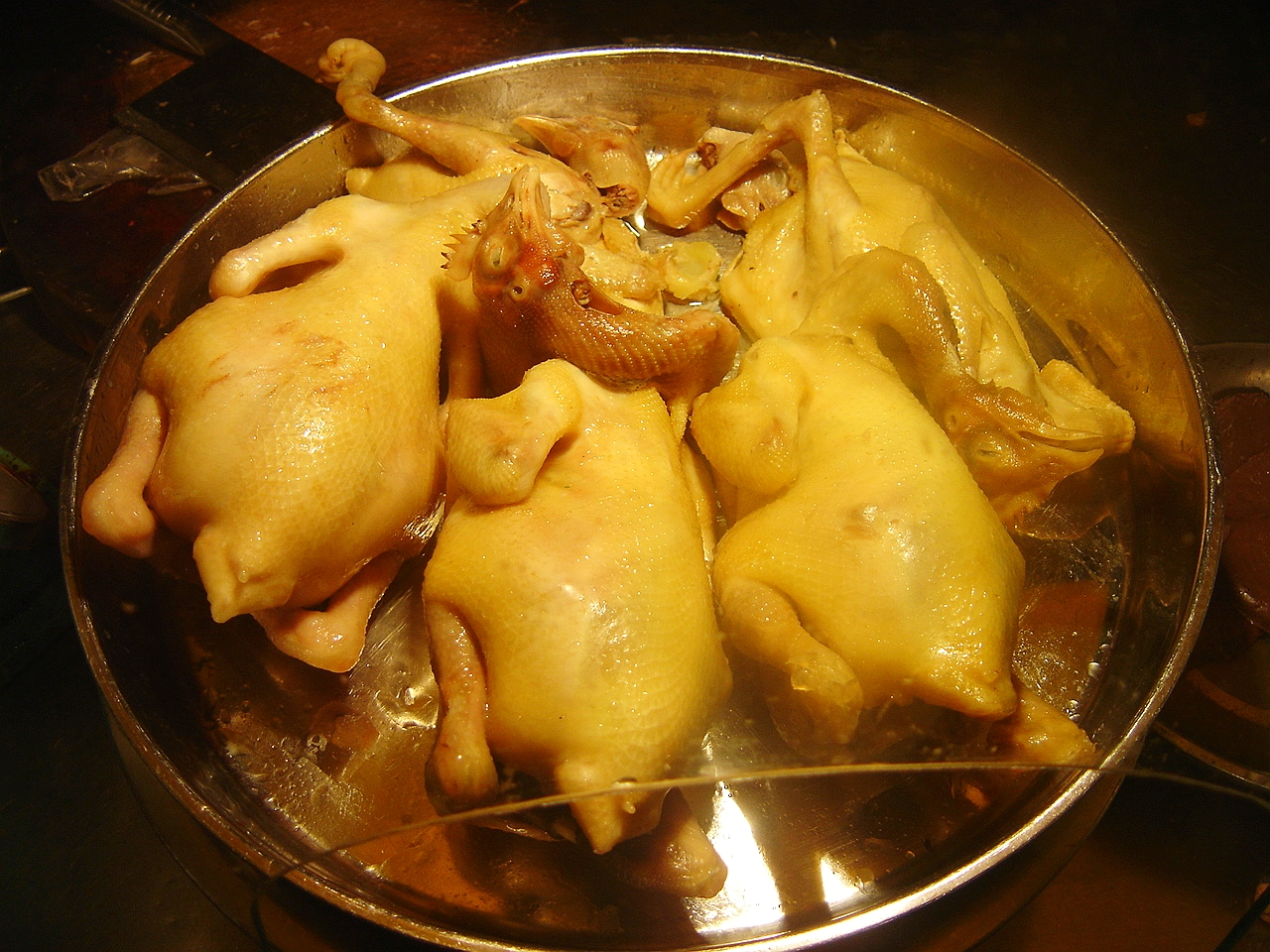
Wenchang Chicken after cooking, before being cut into pieces.

Wenchang Chicken originates from this city.

=== Points of interest ===
Wenchang is the ancestral home of the Soong sisters: Soong Ching-ling, Soong Ai-ling, Soong Mei-ling and the birthplace of their father Charlie Soong.

- Mulantou Lighthouse - located at the northernmost point of Wenchang, this is the fifth tallest lighthouse in the world.
- Qinglan Harbour
- Temple of Confucius

== Spaceport ==
The Wenchang Satellite Launch Center is located in Wenchang. This is China's fourth and southernmost space vehicle launch facility and because of its low latitude, the Wenchang Satellite Launch Center has been selected to launch China's space station. On 22 September 2007, CCTV officially announced the construction of an expanded Wenchang Satellite Launch Center has been approved by the State Council and the Central Military Commission of the People's Republic of China after decades of postponement due to political concerns.

== Education ==
- Hainan College of Foreign Studies

== Notable people ==
Wenchang is the ancestral homeland of most overseas Hainanese migrants. A significant portion of the Hainanese populations in Thailand, Vietnam, Malaysia, Singapore, the United Kingdom, Australia, the United States, Canada, and Europe trace their roots to Wenchang. The Wenchang dialect is regarded as the prestige variety of the Hainanese language and is used by the island's provincial broadcasting media.

=== Artists ===
- Aw Tee Hong (歐世鴻) - Singaporean painter and sculptor.
- Ho Ho Ying (何和應) - Singaporean abstract artist.

=== Business ===
- Charlie Soong (宋嘉樹) - Chinese businessman

=== Eunuchs ===
- Wu Rui: a young Chinese man castrated and enslaved as a eunuch in Lê dynasty Annam (Vietnam).
