= Hainanese chicken rice =

Southeast Asian dish

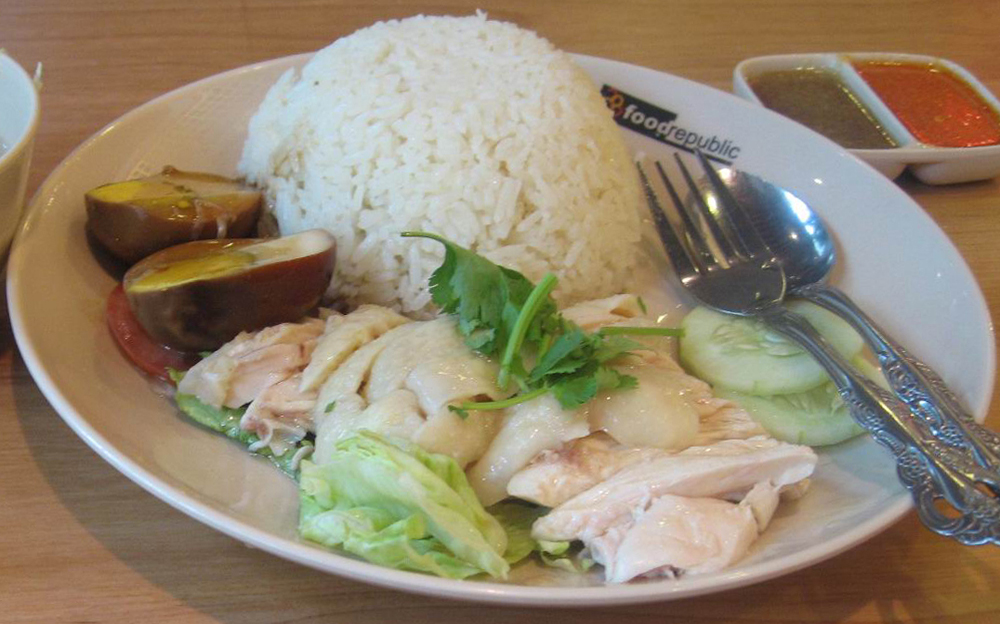
- Hainanese chicken rice at a Singaporean food court
- Alternative names: Hainan chicken, chicken rice, Hainan chicken rice, nasi ayam, khao man gai, khao man kai, bai moan hai nam
- Region or state: Regions of Southeast Asia with Chinese populations
- Associated cuisine: Cambodia, Indonesia, Malaysia, Myanmar, Singapore, Thailand, Vietnam
- Main ingredients: Chicken, chicken stock, chicken fat, rice, cucumbers
- Food energy (per serving): 670 kcal (2,800 kJ)

Hainanese chicken rice
- Traditional Chinese: 海南雞飯
- Simplified Chinese: 海南鸡饭
- Literal meaning: Hainan chicken rice
Transcriptions
Standard Mandarin
- Hanyu Pinyin: Hǎinán jīfàn
Hakka
- Romanization: hoi nam gai fan
Yue: Cantonese
- Jyutping: hoi2 naam4 gai1 faan6
Southern Min
- Hokkien POJ: hái-lâm-kue-pn̄g, hái-lâm-ke-pn̄g

Hainanese chicken rice is a dish of poached or roasted chicken with seasoned rice, served with chilli sauce and usually with cucumbers, tomato slices or cilantro garnishes. It was created by immigrants from Hainan in southern China and adapted from the Hainanese dishes of Wenchang chicken and Wenchang chicken rice.

The dish can be found throughout Southeast Asia where Hainanese people settled, particularly in Cambodia, Indonesia, Malaysia, Thailand, and Vietnam, where it remains a culinary staple. It is widely considered one of the national dishes of Singapore, and is commonly associated with Singaporean cuisine, being widely available in most food courts and hawker centres around the country.

== History ==
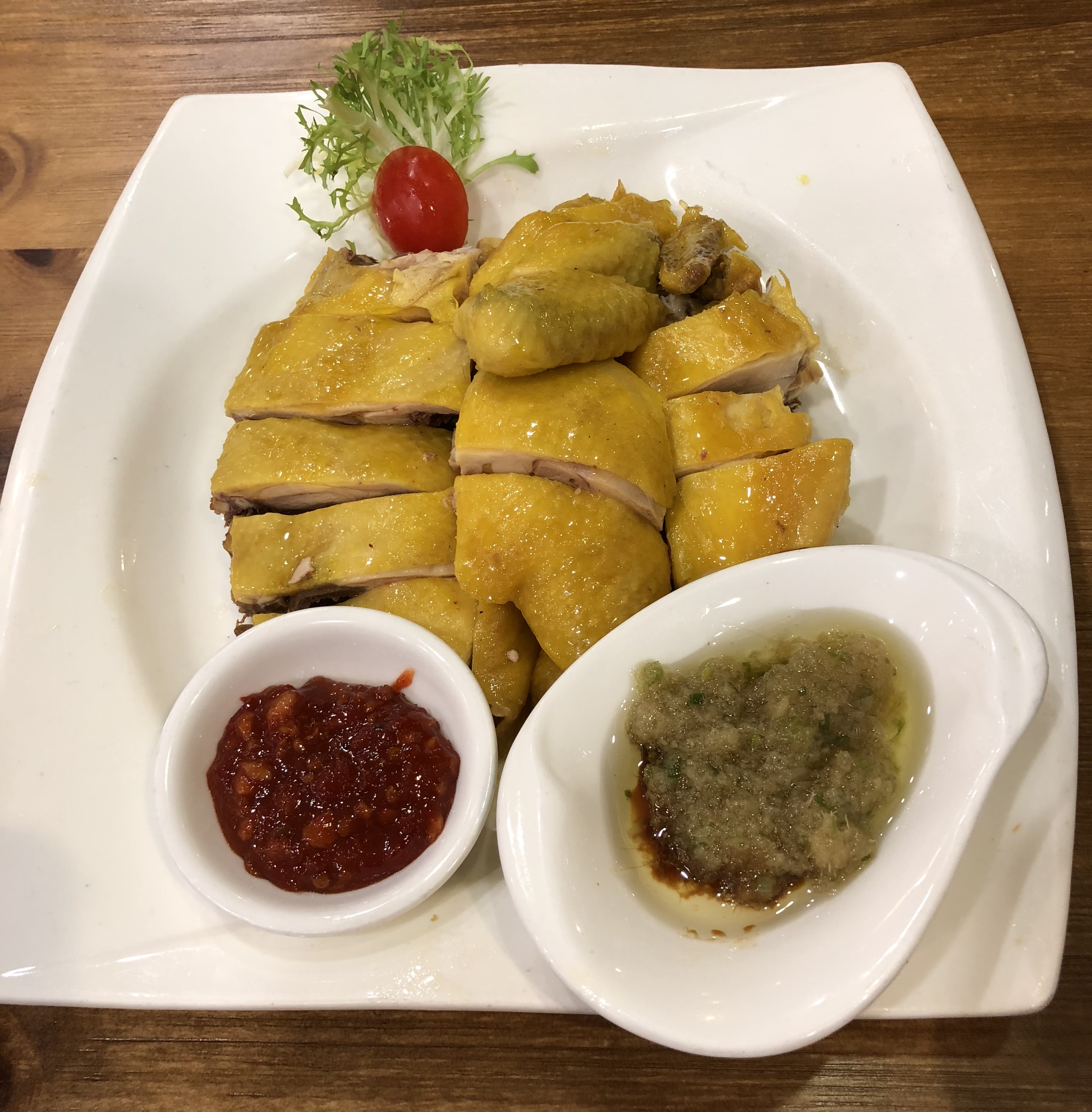
Hainanese chicken from Jiangyin City

Hainanese chicken rice is a dish adapted from early Chinese immigrants originally from Hainan province in southern China. It is based on a well-known Hainanese dish called Wenchang chicken, which is one of four important Hainan dishes dating to the Qing dynasty. The original dish was adapted by the Hainanese overseas Chinese population in the Nanyang area (present-day Southeast Asia). The Hainanese in China traditionally used a specific breed, the Wenchang chicken, to make the dish. They would usually cook rice with the leftover chicken stock to create a dish known as "Wenchang chicken rice" (文昌鸡饭). Wenchang chicken rice remained a dish for special occasions in Hainanese homes in Singapore until the 1940s.

There is a shared culture of seasoned rice dishes across Hainan and the Leizhou peninsula. Wenchang chicken rice is closely related to another chicken rice dish known as Anpu chicken rice (安铺鸡饭) from Zhanjiang in western Guangdong province, and Anpu chicken rice is speculated to be the predecessor to Wenchang chicken rice. The city of Zhanjiang is also known for its wild betel rice (蛤蒌饭) and duck rice (鸭仔饭).

Almost every country in Asia with a history of immigration from China has a version of Hainanese chicken rice. The San Francisco Chronicle says, "the dish maps 150 years' immigration from China's Hainan Island...to Singapore and Malaysia, where the dish is often known as Hainan chicken rice; to Vietnam, where it is called "Hai Nam chicken"; and to Thailand, where it has been renamed khao man gai ("chicken fat rice")."

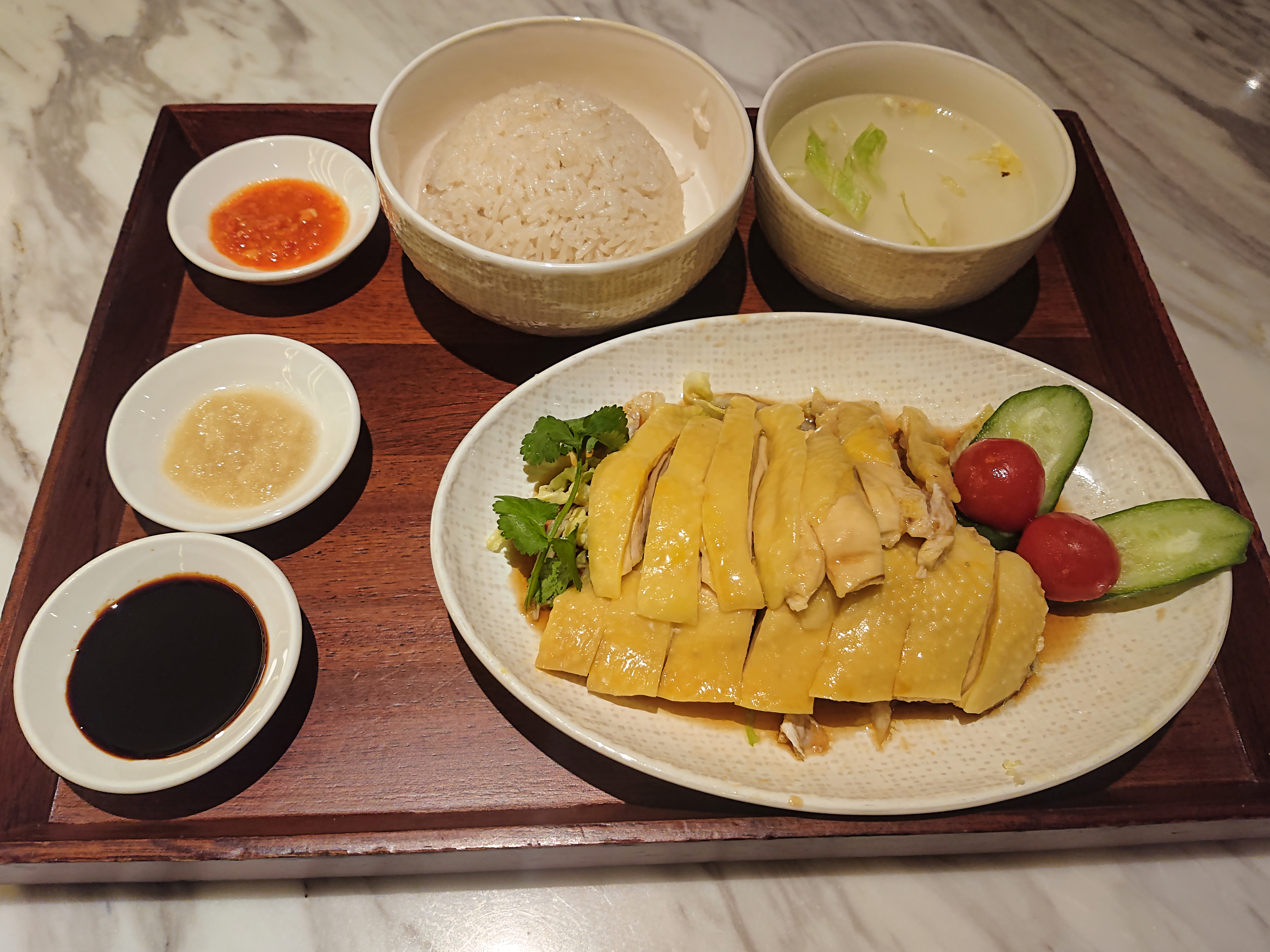
Hainanese chicken rice in Hong Kong

When it comes to the history of Wenchang chicken, according to the records of Lin Zhemin from the Livestock and Veterinary Research Institute of Hainan Province, it has long been a delicacy used by local officials and people to entertain guests. According to the Hainan Chamber of Commerce, it is said that during the Ming Dynasty, a Wenchang native served in the imperial court and brought Wenchang chicken back from his hometown to entertain members of the royal family during the Lunar New Year. As they tasted it, the royals praised, "This chicken hails from the land of culture, where talents gather and the culture flourishes. The chicken is also delicious and fragrant, truly deserving the name Wenchang chicken!"

Additionally, during the reign of the Guangxu Emperor of the Qing Dynasty, there were several large banyan trees in Wenchang, which bore seeds all year round. The chickens pecked at these seeds and became plump and delicious, contributing to the reputation of Wenchang chicken's deliciousness. The earliest mention can be found in the Qing Dynasty book "Lingnan Miscellaneous Poems", which states, "There is a kind of hen in Wenchang County that tastes as good as a rooster."

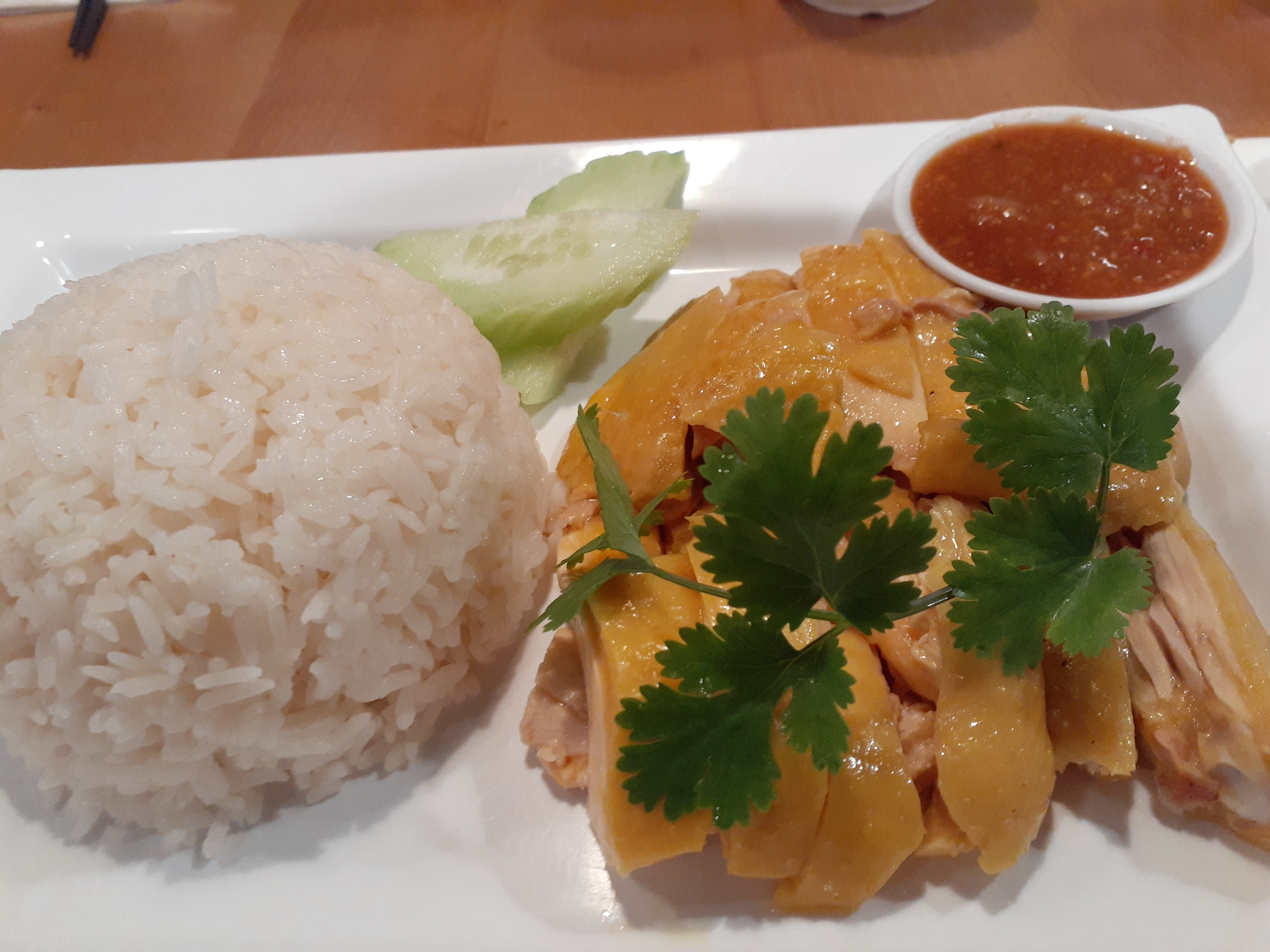
Thai-style Hainanese chicken rice in Hong Kong

Based on historical records and inference, Wenchang chicken was introduced to Hainan Island, specifically Wenchang County, around the early 1600s during the Ming Dynasty, along with mainland immigrants, and was cultivated in this unique natural environment. By the Ming and Qing dynasties, there was already a tradition of raising Wenchang chickens in rural areas of Wenchang. It was mainly used as a delicacy for festivals, entertaining guests, and giving gifts. After the revolution in China in 1949, it was still difficult to buy or eat Wenchang chicken in the market or restaurants.

According to a 2006 study in "Meat Research", Wenchang chicken is a high-quality chicken breed in Hainan with a history of over 400 years and is one of the four famous dishes of Hainan. In the 1980s, due to the impact of foreign chicken breeds, Wenchang chicken was once on the brink of extinction.

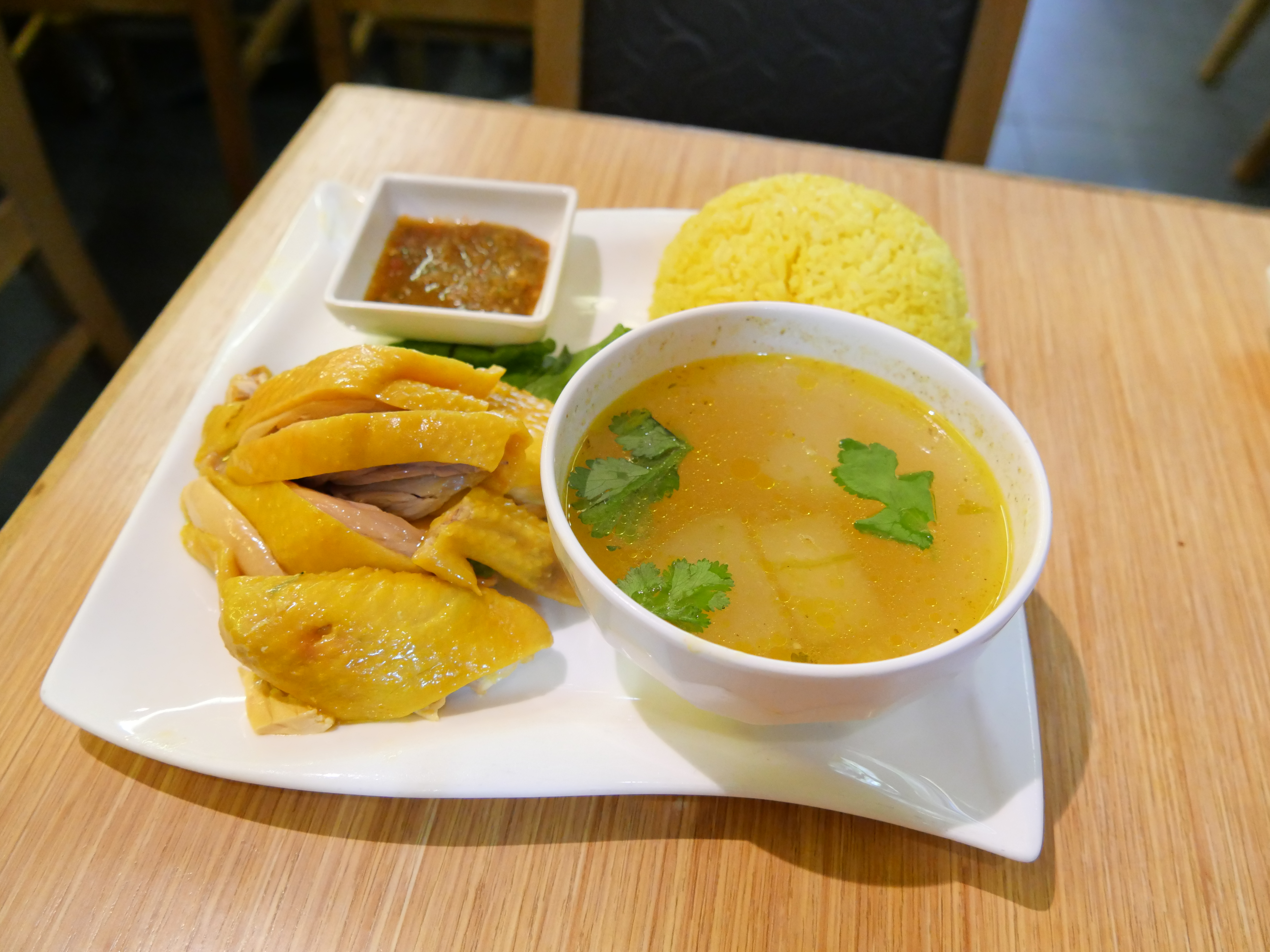
With radish soup

=== Controversy over origin ===
In a debate that stretches back decades to 1965, when the two countries split, Malaysia and Singapore have both laid claim to inventing the dish.

In 2009, Malaysian Tourism Minister Ng Yen Yen said that Hainanese chicken rice was "uniquely Malaysian" and had been "hijacked" by other countries. Ng later clarified that she was misquoted on her intention to patent the foods, and that a study on the origins of the foods would be conducted "and an apology conveyed if it was wrongly claimed."

In 2018, then Malaysian Finance Minister Lim Guan Eng joked that Singapore claimed "chicken rice is theirs (and) if we're not careful, 'char koay teow' will become theirs" one day.

The debate has been described as an example of gastronationalism.

== Reception ==
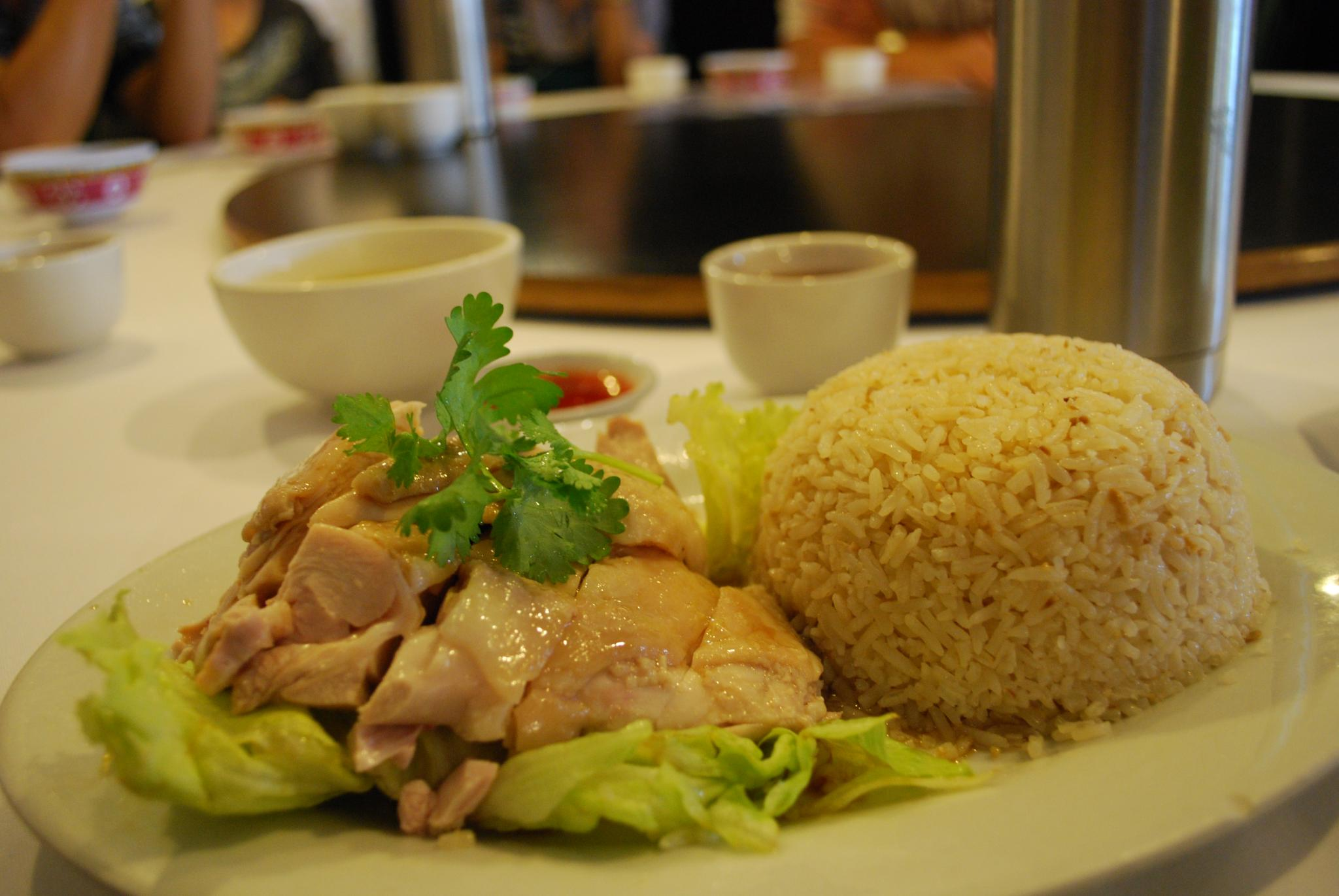
In Australia

Catherine Ling of CNN called Hainanese chicken rice one of the "40 Singapore foods we can't live without". It was listed as one of the "World's 50 best foods" by CNN in 2018. David Farley of the BBC called it "the dish worth the 15-hour flight" and said it was "deceptively simple – which is good, because on paper it sounds awfully boring." Saveur called it "one of the most beloved culinary exports of Southeast Asia."

== Variations ==
=== Malaysia ===
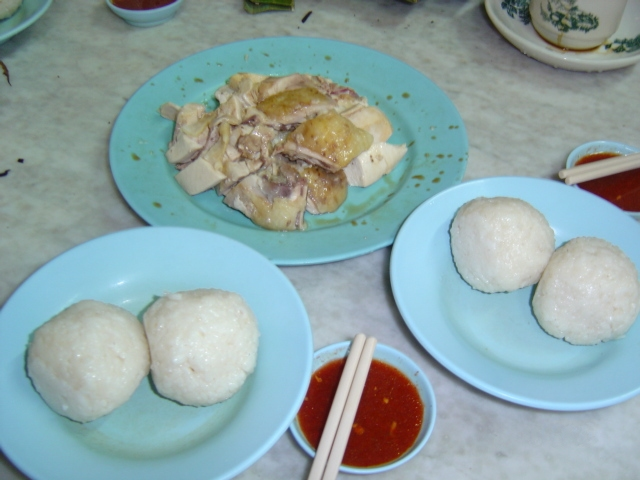
'Chicken rice balls', a Malaysian variation of chicken rice, in Muar, Johor, Malaysia

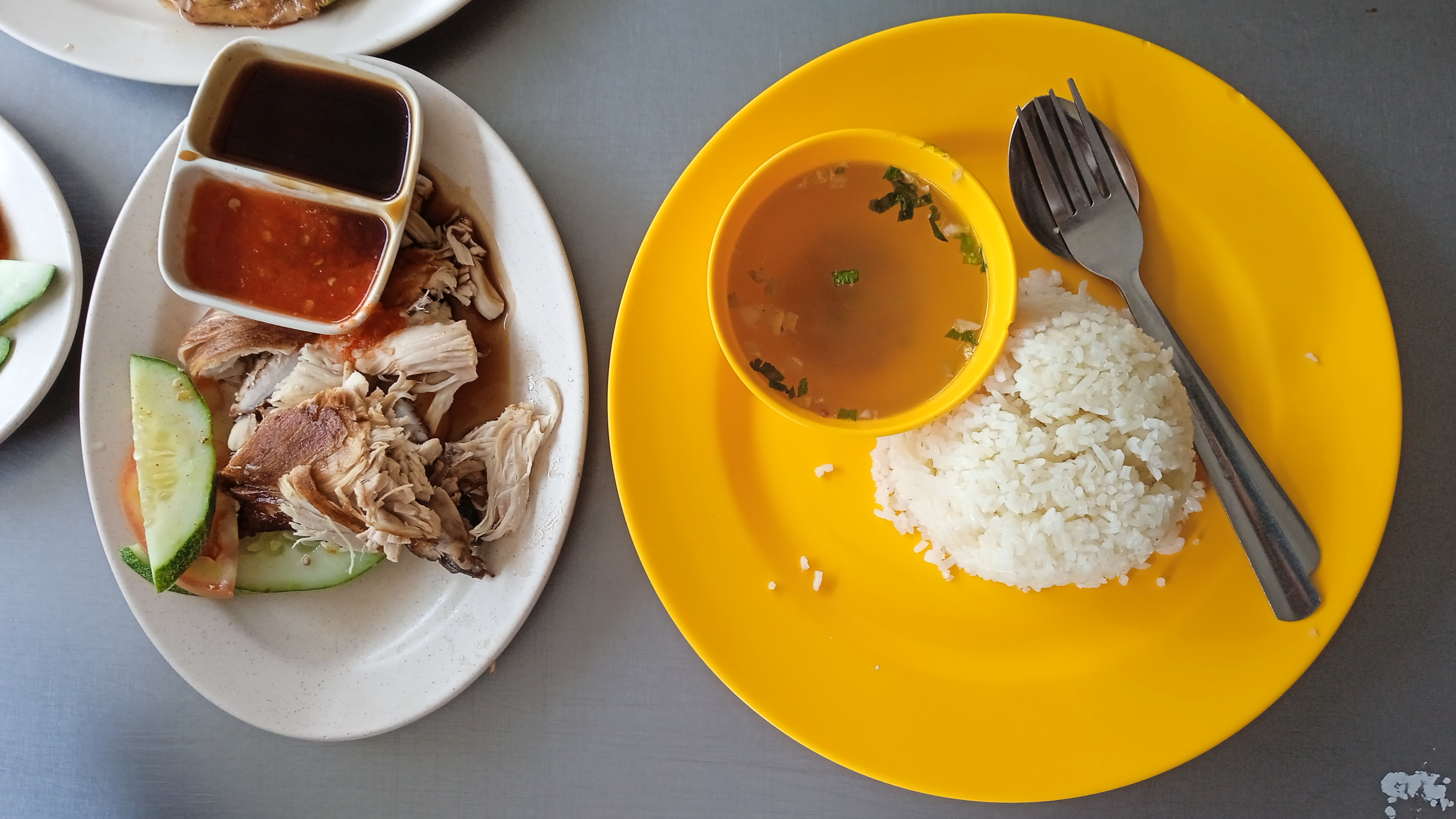
Nasi ayam

In Malaysia, nasi ayam (lit. "chicken rice" in Bahasa Melayu) is "a culinary staple" and a popular street food, particularly in Ipoh, a center of Hainanese immigration.

The general term nasi ayam can refer to multiple variations including roasted and fried chicken, can be served with a variety of sauces including barbecue, and can be accompanied by a variety of side dishes including steamed rice rather than seasoned 'oily' rice, soup, or chicken offal.

In Malacca and Muar, the rice is served in balls rather than in bowls; this dish is commonly known as Chicken rice balls. Steamed rice is shaped into golf ball-sized orbs and served alongside the chopped chicken.

=== Singapore ===
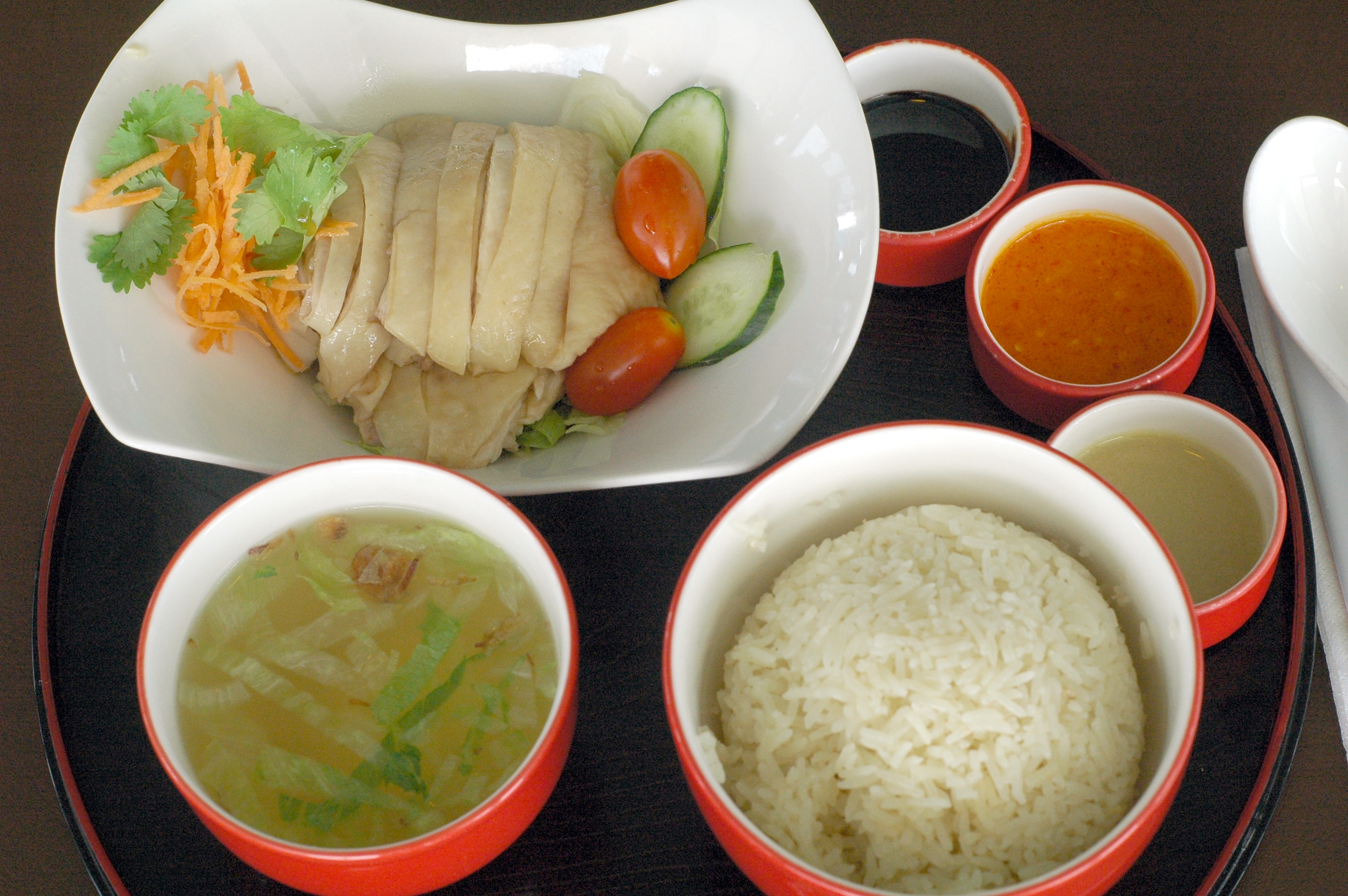
Hainanese chicken rice at Chatterbox, Meritus Mandarin Singapore

In Singapore, the dish was born out of frugality, created by servant-class immigrants trying to utilise limited sources to its maximum. An old hen which had passed its egg-laying years would be slaughtered to be cooked into broth and rice to extract the chicken flavour.

The first chicken rice restaurants opened in Singapore during Japanese occupation in World War II, when the British were forced out and their Hainanese servants lost their source of income. One of the first was Yet Con, which opened in the early 1940s. There were also sources stating that Wang Yiyuan, a street hawker, first started selling "chicken rice balls wrapped in banana leaves" in Singapore during the 1920s. The dish was popularised in Singapore in the 1950s by Moh Lee Twee, whose Swee Kee Chicken Rice Restaurant operated from 1947 to 1997. Hong Kong food critic Chua Lam credits Moh with the creation of the dish.

Hainanese chicken rice is considered one of Singapore's national dishes. It is eaten "everywhere, every day" in Singapore and is a "ubiquitous sight in hawker centres across the country". The chicken is typically served with seasoned rice, with chilli sauce and usually with cucumber garnishes. While most commonly associated with Singaporean cuisine, the dish is also seen throughout Southeast Asia and in parts of the United States, where the dish is named "Singapore chicken rice" in some places. The dish is widely popular in Singapore and can be found in hawker centres, restaurants and hotels.

The chicken is prepared in accordance with traditional Hainanese methods, which involve poaching the entire chicken at sub-boiling temperatures to both cook the chicken and produce the stock. The chicken is dipped in ice after cooking to produce a jelly-like skin finishing and hung to dry.

The stock is skimmed of fat and some of the fat and liquid, along with ginger, garlic, and pandan leaves, are used in the cooking of the rice, producing an oily, flavourful rice sometimes known as "oily rice". In Singapore "the most important part of chicken rice is not the chicken, but the rice."

The dish is served with a dipping sauce of freshly minced red chilli and garlic, usually accompanied with dark soy sauce and freshly ground ginger. Fresh cucumber boiled in the chicken broth and light soy sauce with a dash of sesame oil is served with the chicken, which is usually served at room temperature. Some stalls may also serve Nonya acar as an additional side.

=== Thailand ===
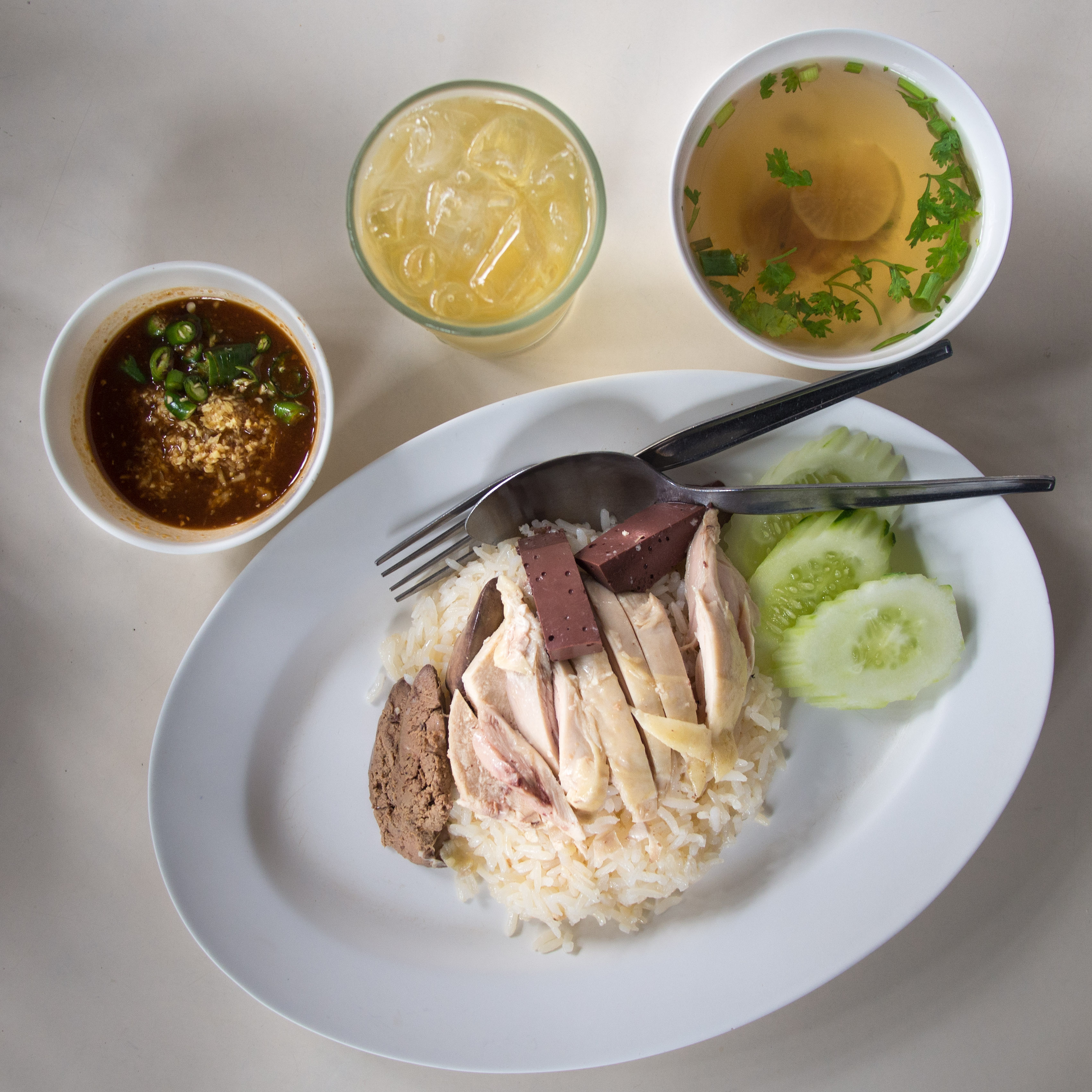
Khao man kai, a Thai variation on Hainanese chicken rice

Hainanese chicken rice is a common dish in Thailand where it is called khao man kai (Thai: ข้าวมันไก่, pronounced [kʰâːw mān kàj]), literally meaning "chicken oily rice". The chickens used in Thailand for this dish are usually free range chickens of local breeds, resulting in a leaner and tastier texture; however, meat from chickens of large-scale poultry farms is increasingly being used. Khao man kai is served with a garnish of cucumbers and occasionally chicken blood tofu and fresh coriander, along with a bowl of nam sup, a clear chicken broth which often contains sliced daikon. The accompanying sauce is most often made with tauchu (also known as yellow soybean paste), thick soy sauce, chilli, ginger, garlic and vinegar.

One famous Bangkok neighbourhood for Khao man kai is Pratunam in Ratchathewi district, located near to Platinum Fashion Mall, CentralWorld and Ratchaprasong Intersection. A restaurant in Pratunam received Bib Gourmand awards from the 2018 Michelin Guide. Khao man kai is also well known in other areas, including Pracha Chuen, Yaowarat and Phasi Charoen near Bang Wa BTS station and Phyathai 3 Hospital including various places are Thanon Tok near Rama III Bridge, Thong Lor on Sukhumvit Road, Wat Suthiwararam, Sathu Pradit, Bang Kapi, Wat Saket, and Saphan Kwai neighbourhoods.

=== Vietnam ===
The dish is known as Cơm Gà Hải Nam in Vietnamese, and is common in South Vietnam.

=== Cambodia ===
In Cambodia, the dish is known as bay moan hai nam (បាយមាន់ហៃណាំ) in Khmer, which translates to "Hainanese chicken rice". An assortment of pickled vegetables is served alongside as a street food. Its origins can be traced back to the 17th century, where it is believed to have been introduced by Hokkien and Hainanese immigrants.

== In popular culture ==
- Khao man kai is a 1998 Ruangsak "James" Loychusak single. Loychusak's grandmother sold Khao man kai in his native Nakhon Si Thammarat.
- Rice Rhapsody (alternative title Hainan Chicken Rice) is a 2004 Singaporean comedy set in a successful chicken rice restaurant in Singapore's Chinatown.
- Chicken Rice War is a 2000 Singaporean romantic comedy adaptation of Romeo and Juliet featuring two rival chicken rice hawker families whose children fall in love.
- Hainanese chicken rice was featured on the Netflix TV series Street Food in season 1.
- Hainanese chicken rice was featured in the 2025 TV anime series Mobile Suit Gundam GQuuuuuuX. Hainanese chicken rice also trended on Japanese Twitter (X) under the hashtag #Khaomankai (カオマンガイ).

== See also ==
- Wenchang chicken
- Laksa
- Peranakan cuisine
- Chinese Indonesian cuisine
