= Nam kaeng hua chai thao =

Thai-Chinese radish soup

Nam kaeng hua chai thao (Thai: น้ำแกงหัวไชเท้า) is a Thai-Chinese radish soup, traditionally served with khao man kai ("chicken steamed rice"), and also often served with khao mok (Thai biryani), khao na pet (roast duck on rice), khao mu daeng (Thai char siu on rice). Different regions of Thailand tend to have different variations of the soup.

== Ingredients ==
Ingredients typically include:

- Radish
- Ginger
- Broth from pork and/or chicken bones (vegetarian versions also exist)
- Pepper
- Coriander
- Salt
- Sugar

== See also ==
- List of soups
