= Yi bua =

Traditional Hainanese sweet dumpling

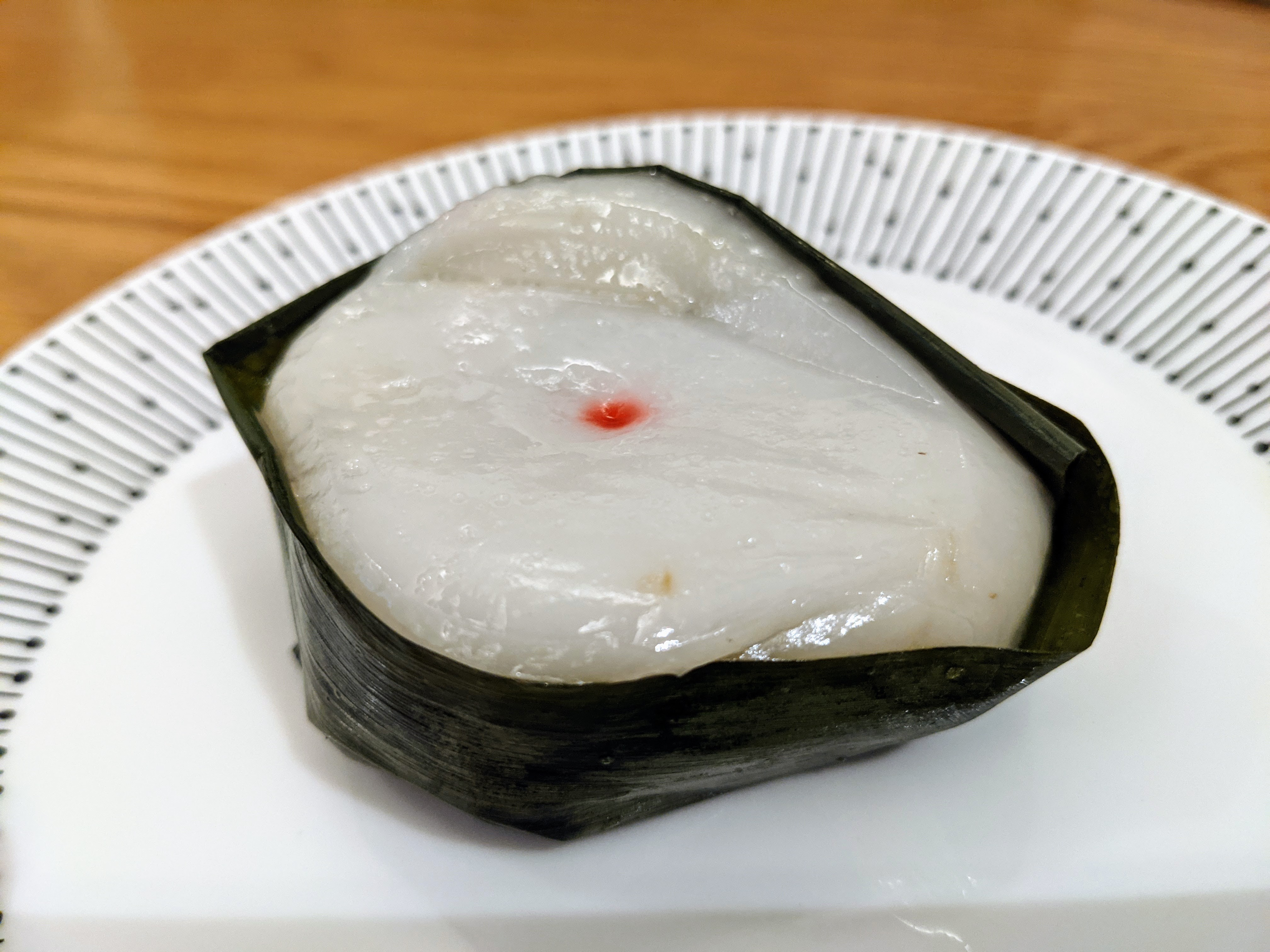
- Hainanese-style yi bua in Singapore
- Alternative names: Yibua
- Type: Pastry
- Course: Snack
- Place of origin: China
- Region or state: Hainan
- Created by: Hainanese people
- Main ingredients: Glutinous rice flour

Yi bua (Chinese: 薏粑; pinyin: yìbā; HTS: i^{7}ba^{1}; also spelt yi buak, yi buah, or yibua) is a traditional Hainanese kuih. It is a Hainanese steamed dumpling made of glutinous rice flour dough. Also known as kuih e-oua, it is filled with a palm sugar sweetened mixture of grated coconut, toasted sesame seeds and crushed roasted peanuts, wrapped with sheets of banana leaves pressed into a fluted cup shape, and customarily marked with a dab of red food colouring. This kuih is traditionally served during a wedding and a baby's full-moon celebration.

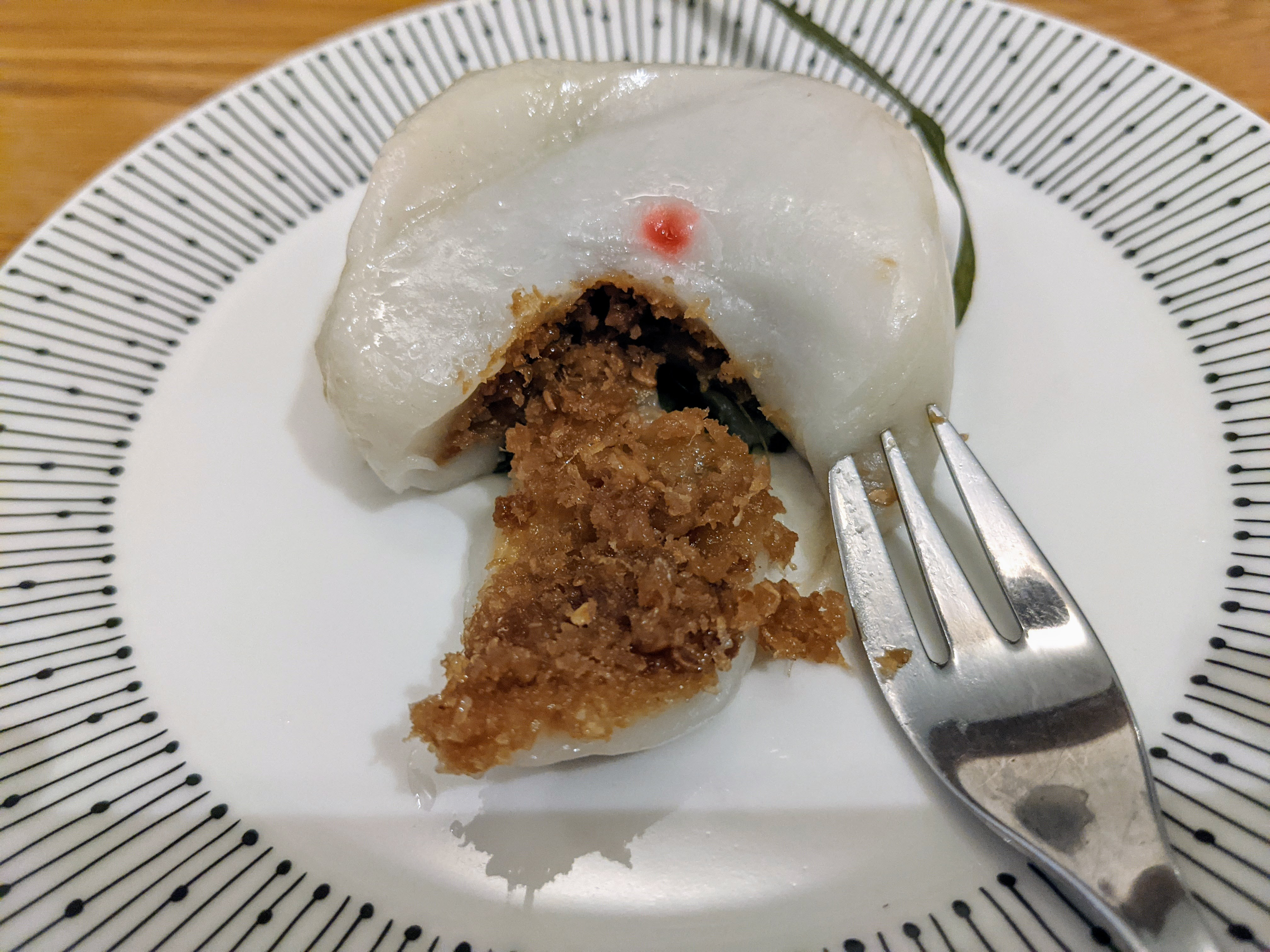
Yi bua cut open to show brown sugar/coconut/peanut filling.

== See also ==
- Kue
- Kuih
- List of steamed foods
- Mochi
