= YakiniQuest =

- Interactive map of YakiniQuest

Restaurant information
- Head chef: Suguru Ishida
- Food type: Yakiniku
- Location: 333A Orchard Road, #04-08/09/10 Mandarin Gallery, 238897, Singapore
- Coordinates: 1.3020°N 103.8366°E
- Seating capacity: 64
- Website: http://www.yakiniquest.sg

YakiniQuest is a yakiniku restaurant in the Mandarin Gallery along Orchard Road in Singapore. Owned by Suguru and Tomoko Ishida, the restaurant opened in 2014.

== History ==
The restaurant was initially founded on 48 Boat Quay in January 2014 by Suguru Ishida and his wife Tomoko, who were previously food bloggers who reviewed yakiniku restaurants, owning the YakiniQuest.com blog. The restaurant moved from Boat Quay to the Mandarin Gallery in January 2022.

== Reception ==
Jaime Ee of The Business Times gave the restaurant a score of 7 out of 10 in her review of the restaurant, stating, "For the price, quality and service, Yakiniquest acquits itself well, so you're assured of a minimum standard here." Tan Hseuh Yun of The Straits Times gave the restaurant a positive review, and recommended the Special Omakase course. The restaurant was included in The Straits Times' list of the 6 best yakiniku restaurants in Singapore in 2016.
