= Wenchang chicken =

Chicken dish from Hainan, China

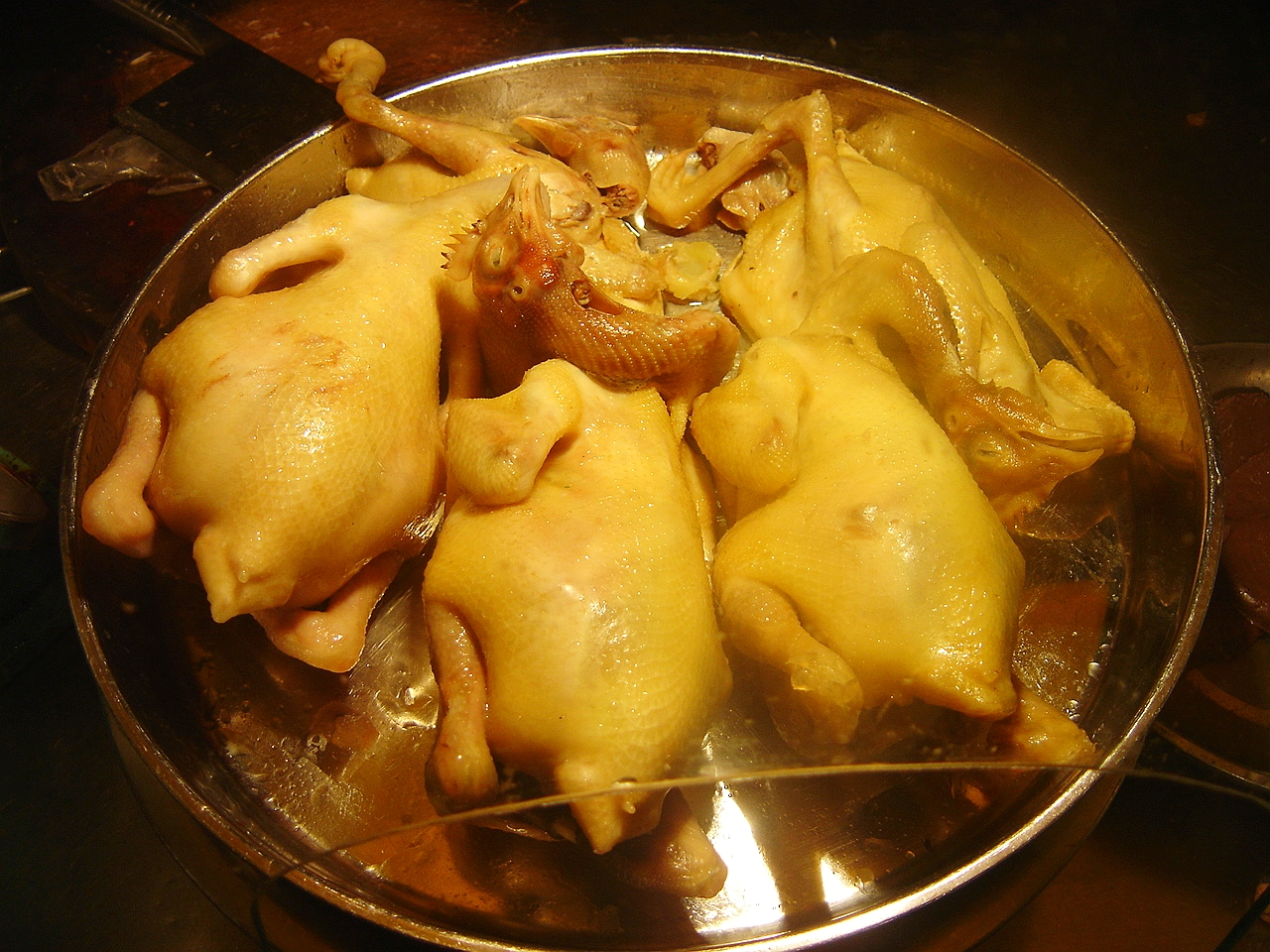
- Wenchang chicken after cooking, before being cut into pieces
- Region or state: Hainan, China
- Created by: Hainanese
- Main ingredients: Chicken

Wenchang chicken (simplified Chinese: 文昌鸡; traditional Chinese: 文昌雞; pinyin: Wénchāng Jī) is a type of chicken breed and a chicken dish from the Wenchang city area in the island province of Hainan, China.

== The chicken ==
This variety of small, fleshy free-range chicken is fed coconut and peanut bran. During the last two months before going to market, they are kept in coops above the ground. It is known for having tender meat.

== The dish ==
Wenchang chicken is known throughout the province of Hainan. The traditional way to prepare Wenchang chicken is "white cutting" (白切), which involves immersing the chicken in almost boiling water and cooking to preserve its softness and tenderness. It is then eaten by dipping the pieces in a mixture of spices, including chopped ginger and garlic, and salt. The skin of Wenchang chicken is typically yellow, with an oily appearance, although the meat is somewhat drier and has more texture than battery chickens. This dish is also popular in mainland China, Hong Kong, Taiwan, and other Southeast Asian countries.

=== Hainanese chicken rice ===
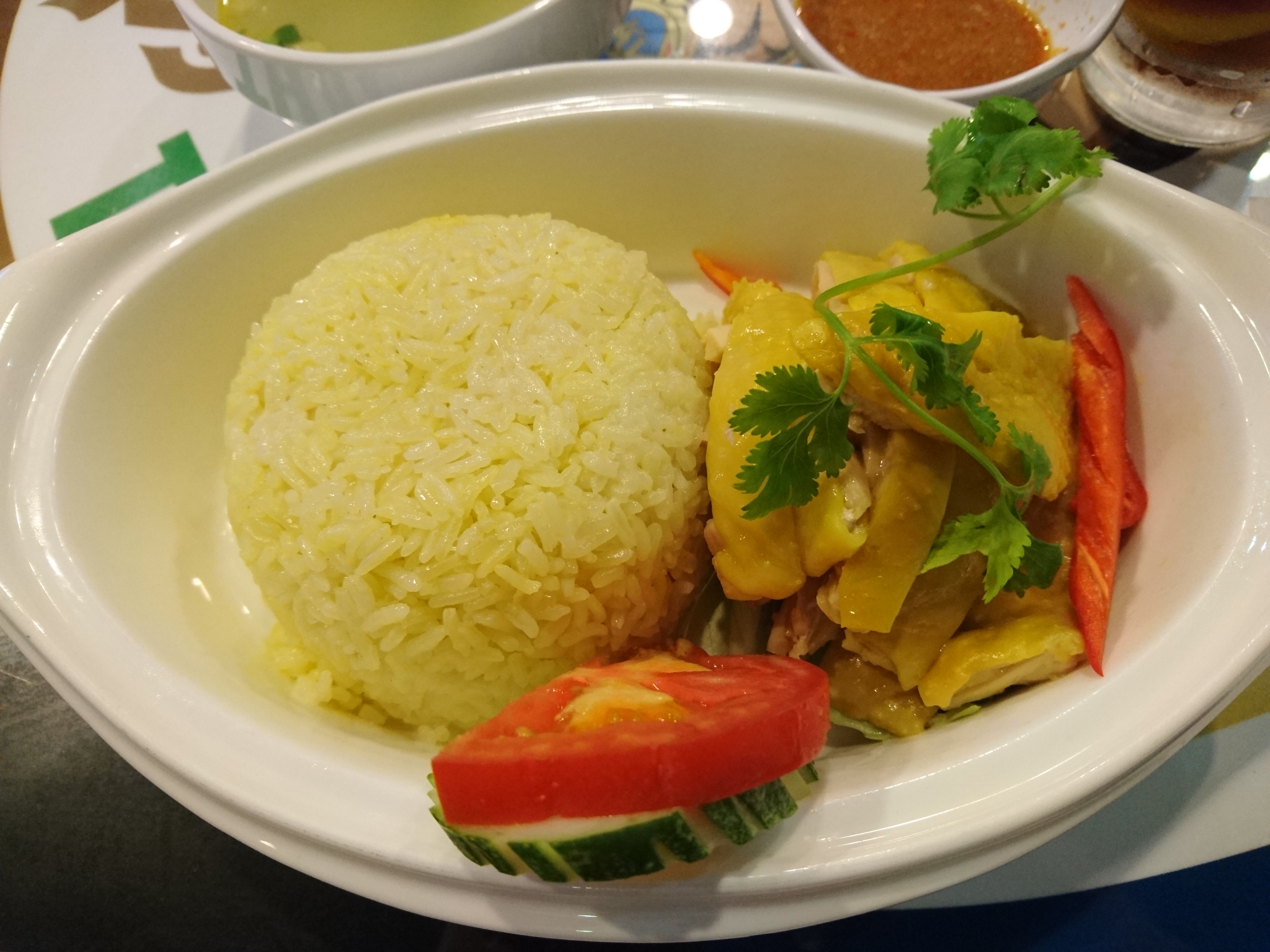
Hainanese chicken rice developed from Wenchang chicken

During the 19th and 20th century, a significant amount of Hainanese decided to move south into the region which was then widely known as Nanyang (南洋). Many also brought along their culinary expertise, creating numerous dishes that are a fusion of both their cuisine back in Hainan along with local ingredients available, or inventing a new dish entirely.

In the context of Wenchang chicken, it is the originator of the dish Hainanese chicken rice and "one of the most beloved culinary exports of Southeast Asia".

The dish came into fruition in the 1920s, by a Hainanese chef named Wang Yiyuan who was living in Singapore. It then started to gain popularity in the mid 20th century by a chef named Moh Lee Twee, a Singaporean of Hainanese descent, whose Swee Kee Chicken Rice Restaurant operated at Middle Road for five decades.

== See also ==
- Hainan cuisine
- List of chicken dishes
- White cut chicken
- Hainanese chicken rice
