= Hilton Singapore Orchard =

Hotel skyscraper in Singapore

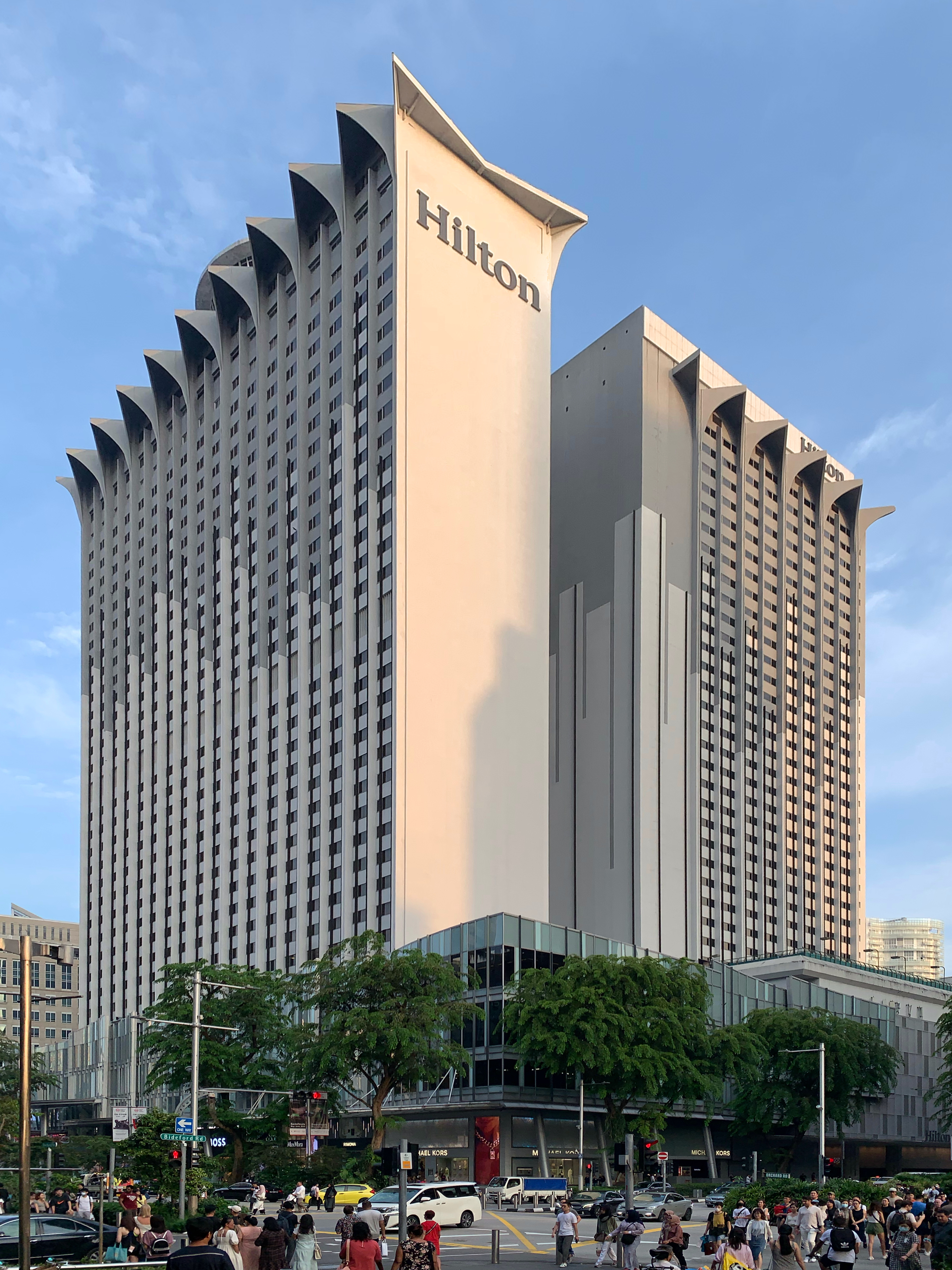
- Hilton Singapore Orchard in 2023
- Former names: Mandarin Singapore; Meritus Mandarin Singapore; Mandarin Orchard Singapore

General information
- Type: Hotel
- Location: 333 Orchard Road, Singapore 238867
- Coordinates: 1.302111°N 103.836111°E
- Completed: Tower 1: 1971; 55 years ago Tower 2: 1973; 53 years ago
- Owner: OUE H-REIT
- Operator: Hilton Hotels and Resorts

Height
- Roof: Tower 1: 144 m (472 ft); Tower 2: 152 m (499 ft)

Technical details
- Floor count: Tower 1: 36; Tower 2: 40

Design and construction
- Architects: Stanley T.S. Leong; Lee Sian Teck Charted Architects
- Developer: Overseas Union Enterprise

Website
- Hilton Singapore Orchard

The Hilton Singapore Orchard is a 1080-room five-star hotel located at 333 Orchard Road in Singapore.

== History ==
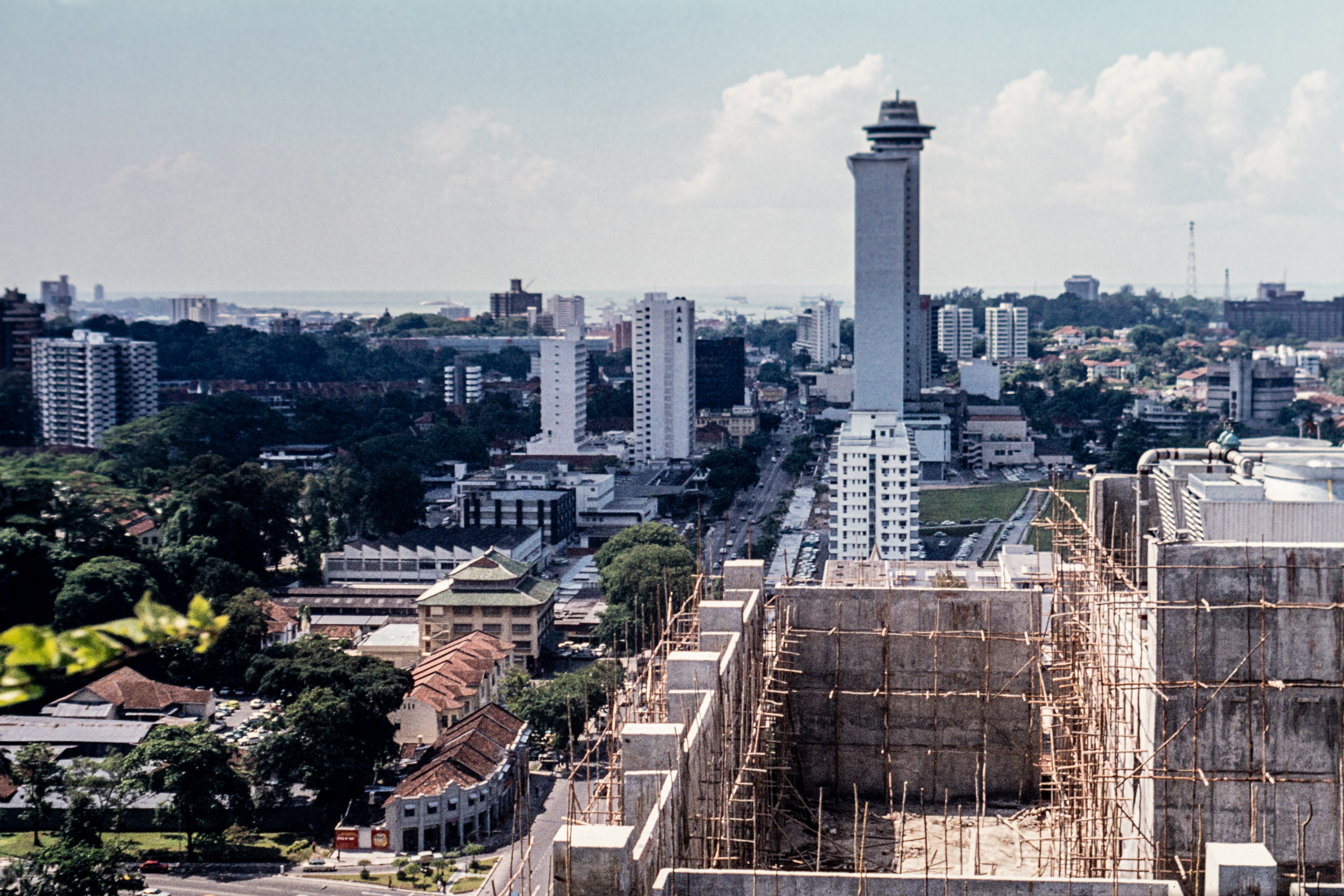
The Mandarin Singapore in 1973, when only the first tower had been built

The hotel opened in 1971 as The Mandarin Singapore, occupying a single 36-storey block facing Orchard Road. Designed by Cyrus Casper Francis, it had 700 rooms. Atop the hotel was the Top of the M, the highest revolving restaurant in Singapore. It has since been converted to a club lounge, open to guests who belong to the hotel chain's loyalty program.

The hotel added a second block in the rear, Tower Two, standing 40 storeys and 152 m (499 ft) high, in 1973. With the addition, designed by Lee Sian Teck Chartered Architects, the hotel became the tallest building in Singapore and is considered a skyscraper for passing the 150 m (490 ft) threshold. The original tower became Tower One.

=== First renaming ===
The hotel was renamed Meritus Mandarin Singapore in 2002. It underwent a S$200 million renovation in 2009. The ground level lobby and the lower levels were converted to a shopping mall, The Mandarin Gallery. The hotel lobby was relocated to level 5, beside the swimming pool. At the conclusion of the renovations, in 2010, the hotel was renamed the Mandarin Orchard Singapore.

=== Second renaming ===
On 24 February 2022, the hotel was renamed again to Hilton Singapore Orchard. The nearby Hilton Singapore was renamed voco Orchard Singapore in January 2022.

== Facilities ==
The Chatterbox restaurant at the hotel is well known for its award-winning Hainanese chicken rice. In 2007, a co-creator of the dish, Steven Low, was laid off after 31 years of service. He promptly opened his own restaurant, serving the same dish at a quarter of the price. The Mandarin Gallery shopping mall houses boutiques including Montblanc (pens), Emporio Armani, Marc by Marc Jacobs, D&G, Vertu, Just Cavalli and Mauboussin, as well as restaurants such as Ippudo, YakiniQuest and the one-Michelin-starred Beni.

Records
Preceded by Asia Insurance Building	Tallest building in Singapore; 144 m (472 ft); 1971–1973	Succeeded by UIC Building
