= Chatterbox (restaurant) =

Restaurant in Singapore

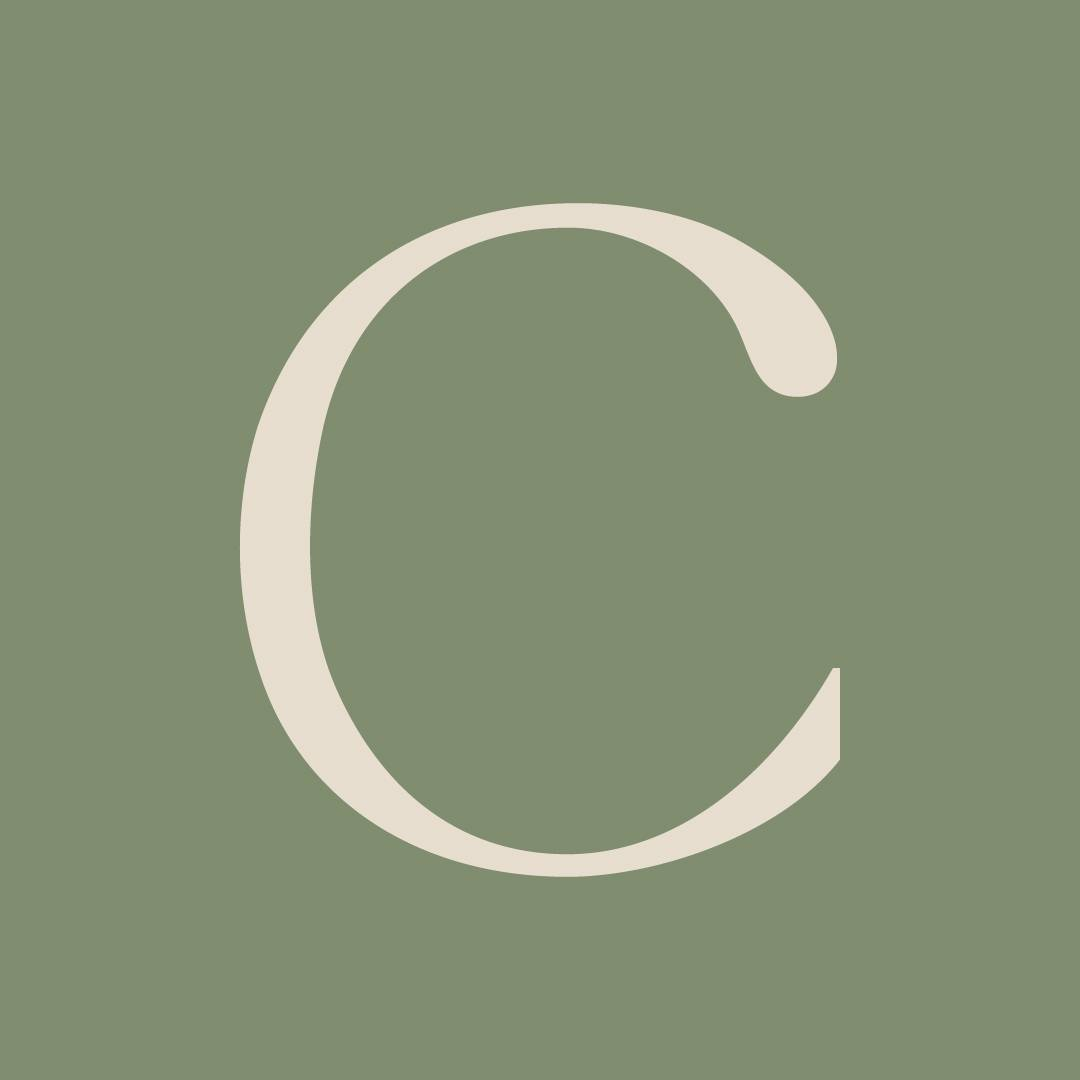

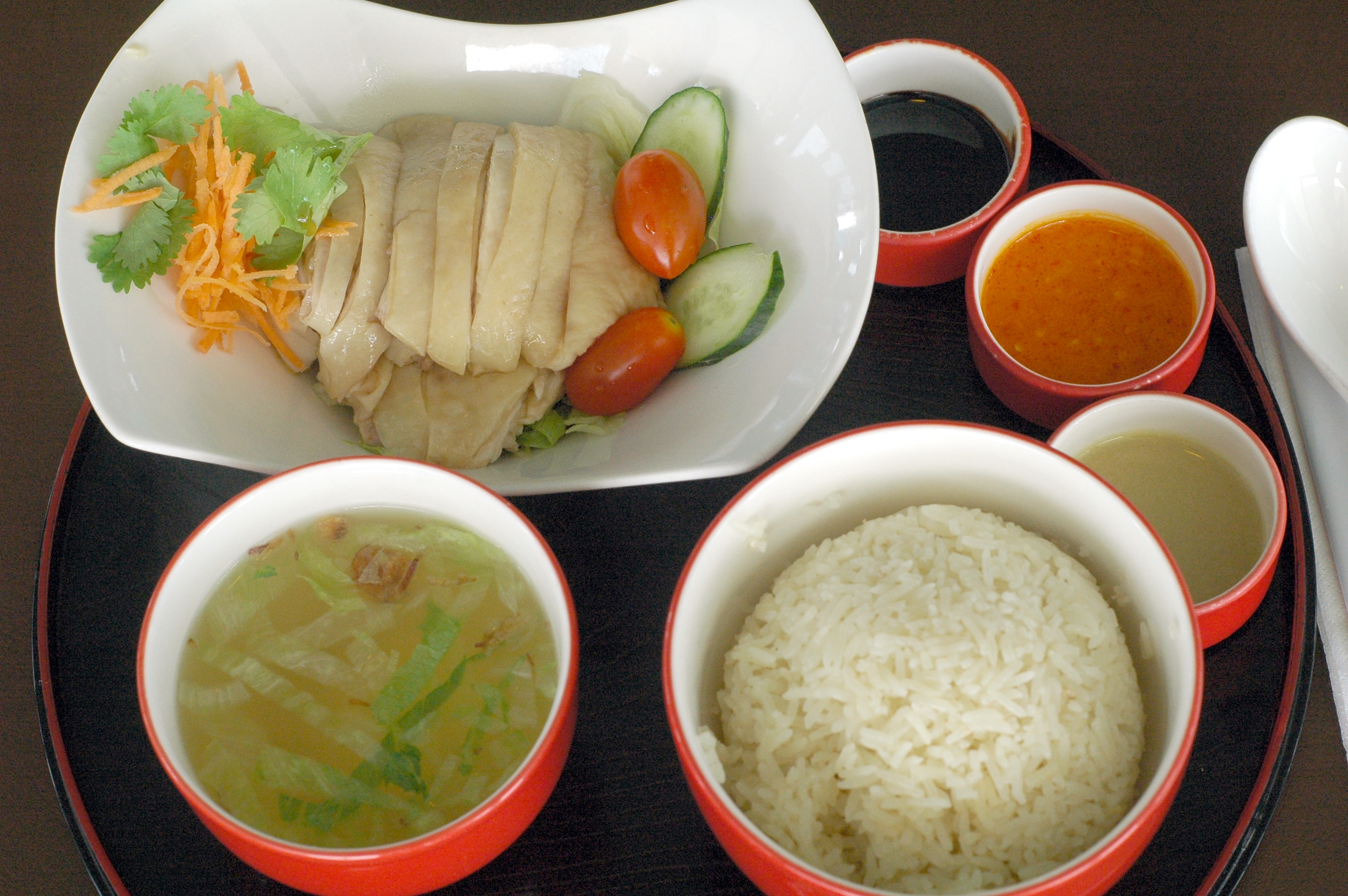
- Hainanese chicken rice at Chatterbox (2008)

- Location within Singapore

Restaurant information
- Established: 1971; 55 years ago
- Head chef: Liew Tian Heong
- Food type: Asian/Singaporean cuisine
- Dress code: Smart casual
- Location: 333 Orchard Rd, #05-03, S238867, Singapore
- Coordinates: 1.3019°N 103.8359°E
- Seating capacity: 126 (main dining area); 15 (bar)
- Reservations: Yes
- Website: Chatterbox

Chatterbox is a restaurant located in Hilton Singapore Orchard. The restaurant opened on 1 August 1971 at The Mandarin Singapore and has since undergone several relocations and renovations. It is known for its Hainanese chicken rice, which was introduced to Chatterbox's first menu by German executive chef Peter Gehrmann.

== Description ==
Chatterbox is located on the fifth floor of Hilton Singapore Orchard. Its main dining area can seat 126 diners, while its bar can seat another 15.

The restaurant primarily serves Asian cuisine. It is known for its Hainanese chicken rice, the recipe for which is reportedly only known by six chefs. The chicken, which is delivered fresh from a Malaysian farm, is steamed in a food steamer and served with aged jasmine rice cooked with ginger, garlic, and pandan leaves. The chicken rice is complemented by soy sauce, chilli padi sauce, and ginger paste. Other dishes served at Chatterbox include coconut ice cream, lobster laksa, ngo hiang, rojak, and salted egg chicken wings.

== History ==
The restaurant opened on 1 August 1971 at The Mandarin Singapore. Its menu was developed by German executive chef Peter Gehrmann and initially offered three local dishes, including char kway teow, laksa, and Hainanese chicken rice. The year of its opening, local politician Tony Tan and his wife celebrated their wedding anniversary with a chicken rice dinner at Chatterbox.

In January 1980, the restaurant moved to the hotel's ground floor and doubled its seating capacity; the relocation cost S$168,000 (US$125,373.13). In November 1989, Chatterbox was closed for a month of renovations costing around S$750,000 (US$559,701.49); American architect Cliff Turtle was commissioned to redesign the restaurant. The restaurant introduced a chicken rice mascot named "Cheeky Chick" in July 1999; Weekend East described it as "an adorable stuffed chicken with ping-pong eyes".

In August 2006, to commemorate its thirty-fifth anniversary, the restaurant held a chicken rice eating competition; the winner finished his portion in one minute and eleven seconds. In September 2019, Chatterbox Café, the first overseas offshoot of Chatterbox, opened in Tsim Sha Tsui, Hong Kong. In October 2021, the Singaporean restaurant was closed for major renovations costing around S$4 million (US$2.99 million). It reopened on 14 March 2022, after the hotel had been rebranded as Hilton Singapore Orchard.

== Reception and legacy ==
Writing for local newspaper The Straits Times in July 1982, T. Phadoemchit described Chatterbox as "Singapore's most profitable hotel coffeeshop". According to a June 1983 report by the Singaporean Business Times, Chatterbox's chicken rice sales alone earned the restaurant S$1.63 million (US$1.22 million), or some 136,000 servings; the restaurant's total turnover for the previous year was S$7.8 million (US$5.82 million).

Tatler Asia reviewer Dudi Aureus visited the restaurant after its reopening in March 2022 and praised it for being "a stalwart for elevated local fare in the local F&B scene all these years". Priyanka Elhence of Epicure Asia highlighted the decor and its "calming and elegant spa-like look", whereas Yeoh Wee Teck of The New Paper found the renovations "stunning".

Chatterbox was one of the earliest hotel restaurants in Singapore to serve local cuisine. The restaurant is believed to have popularised the eating of chicken rice as an individual dish, rather than one shared among several people, as had been the norm prior to August 1971. The chicken rice at Chatterbox has been widely regarded as the most famous in Singapore.
