= Hainan cuisine =

Culinary traditions of Hainan province, China

Hainan cuisine, or Hainanese cuisine, is derived from the cooking styles of the peoples of Hainan Province in China. The food is lighter, less oily, and more mildly seasoned than that of the Chinese mainland. Seafood predominates the menu, as prawn, crab, and freshwater and ocean fish are widely available.

Congee, mantou and baozi are eaten for breakfast, with a noodle dish also being widely eaten. This consists of fine, vermicelli-type noodles with various toppings and gravy. Along with lunch and dinner, late night outdoor barbecue dishes are also served.

== Four Most Famous Dishes in Hainan Cuisine ==
Name	Image	Traditional Chinese	Simplified Chinese	Pinyin	Description
Dongshan lamb		東山羊	东山羊	Dōngshān yáng	This dish comes from Wanning. The distinctive taste of mutton is noticeably absent from the dish. The meat, actually goat, is served tender and soft, after being stewed, roasted or braised in coconut milk.
Hele crab		和樂蟹	和乐蟹	Hélè xiè	Hele crab originated from Hele Town near Wanning, located on the southeastern shores of Hainan. The yellow meat of the crab has an oily texture and a strong aroma. It is usually served with ginger and garlic in vinegar, after being steamed.
Jiaji duck		嘉積鴨	嘉积鸭	Jiājī yā	Originating from Qionghai by the Wanquan River, Jiaji duck is made from steamed or boiled duck that was previously force-fed a blend of cereal and bean curd three times daily.
Wenchang chicken		文昌雞	文昌鸡	Wénchāng jī	This dish, originating in Wenchang, is made from a certain type of free range chicken. The chicken is boiled and then cut into pieces. It is then eaten by dipping the pieces in a mixture of spices, including chopped ginger and salt. The chicken skin is typically yellow, with an oily appearance.

== Other notable dishes ==
Name	Image	Traditional Chinese	Simplified Chinese	Pinyin	Description
Coconut chicken		椰子雞	椰子鸡	Yē zǐ jī	This dish consists of coconut water being boiled like a hot pot with chicken boiling inside. This adds a slight sweet taste to the chicken.
Hainan rice noodles		海南粉	海南粉	Hǎinán fěn	This dish is common in Hainan. Rice noodles are served at room temperature with various toppings, most commonly, roasted peanuts, fresh coriander, pickled vegetables, thin strips of meat, and a thick sauce, sometimes containing thin strips of bamboo. It is typically served with a complimentary bowl of clear or somewhat clear broth made from pig offal and/or chicken powder.
Hainan-style hot pot		海南火鍋	海南火锅	Hǎinán huǒguō	Hainan-style hot pot is normally served in a small wok with a sterno flame underneath. This dish consists of a prepared broth containing pieces of meat. At the time of serving, the meat is not fully cooked. Diners need to wait for approximately 15 minutes before it is ready to eat. Items supplied to be cooked in this type of hot pot include: mushrooms, thin slices of beef, lettuce and other green vegetables. This dish varies in different parts of Hainan.
Lingao suckling pork		臨高乳豬	临高乳猪	Língāo rǔzhū	This dish is from Lingao County. Young pigs weighing approximately 10 kg are either roasted, sautéed, barbecued or steamed. The meat is served when the skin is crisp.
Lingshui sour noodles					Popular throughout the province, this room-temperature dish is made of vermicelli noodles in a thick, pinkish, clear sour sauce with dried strips of beef and dried fish added.
Qingbuliang		清補涼	清补凉	qīng bǔ liáng	Popular sweet cold dessert “soup” usually made with a coconut milk base and topped with fresh fruit and other assorted ingredients including ice cream, shredded coconut and mung beans, among others. Widely available from every dessert stand in Hainan.
Wanquan river carp		萬泉河鯉魚	万泉河鲤鱼	Wànquán hé lǐyú	This dish is made from one of three species of carp that live in the Wanquan River, known locally as the Xijing, Phoenix Tailed and Quan. It is prepared in a variety of ways, with steaming and stewing being the most popular.
Wenquan goose		溫泉鵝	温泉鹅	Wēnquán é	A hybrid species of goose is used for this dish. They are fattened on a mixture that includes bran and silage.
Yi bua		薏粑	薏粑	Yìbā	A sweet glutinous rice steamed dumpling filled with palm sugar, grated coconut, peanuts and spices.

== See also ==
- Chinese cuisine
- List of Chinese dishes
