= Wat Suthi Wararam =

- วัดสุทธิวราราม
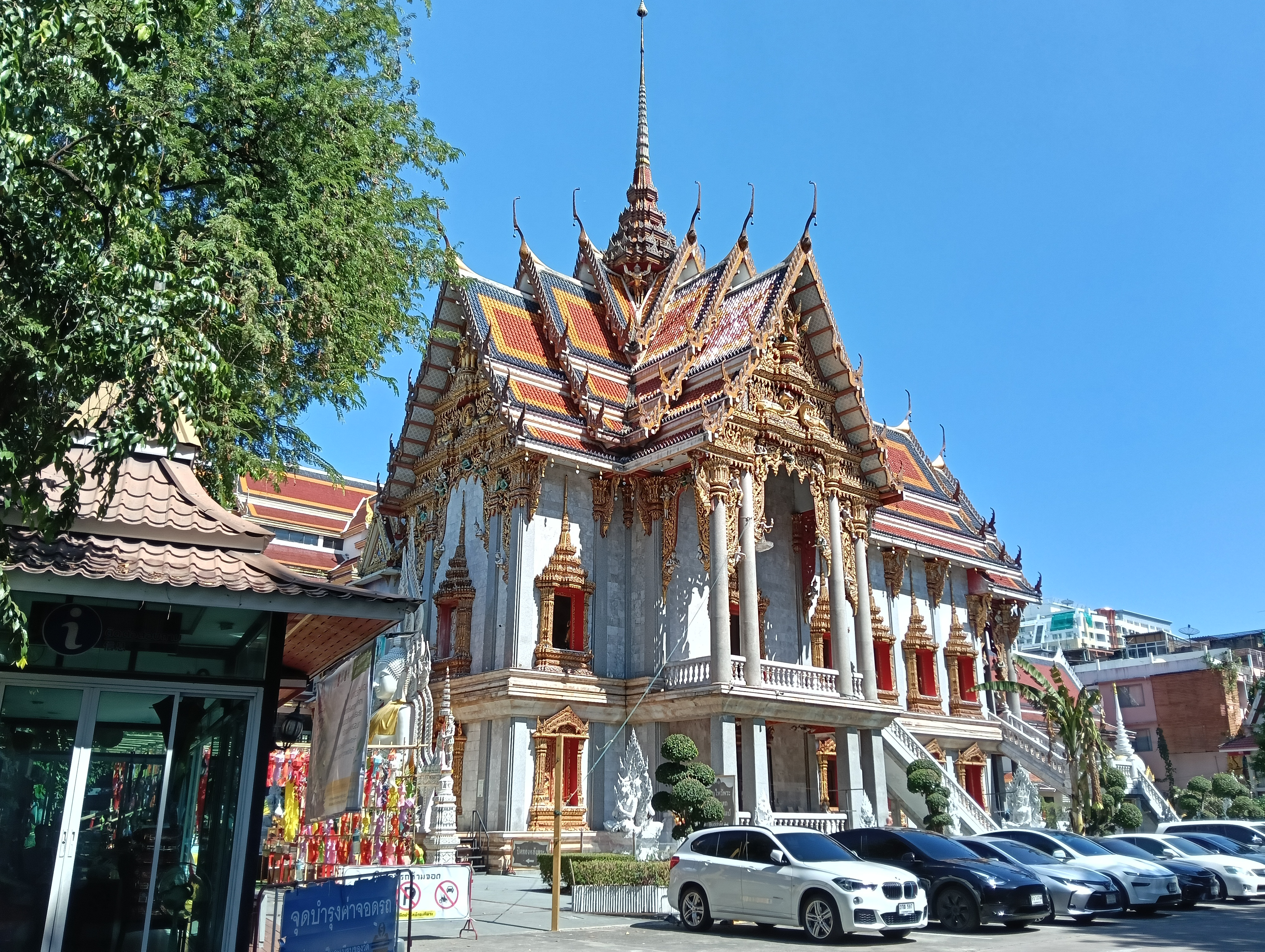
- The ordination hall

- Location in Thailand

Religion
- Affiliation: Theravāda Buddhism
- Status: Active

Location
- Location: Charoen Krung Road, Yan Nawa, Sathon, Bangkok
- Country: Thailand
- Interactive map of Wat Suthi Wararam
- Coordinates: 13°42′45.73″N 100°30′47.09″E

Architecture
- Founder: Unknown

Wat Suthi Wararam (Thai: วัดสุทธิวราราม, RTGS: Wat Sutthi Wararam, pronounced [wát sùt.tʰí.wáʔ.rāː.rāːm]) is a private wat (Thai temple) in Bangkok, Thailand.

== Location ==
The temple is located on Charoen Krung Road, Yan Nawa Subdistrict, Sathon District, near the Bangkok Fish Market Organization.

== History ==
Originally called Wat Lao, this ancient temple was built during the Ayutthaya period. It remained deserted for a long time due to a lack of restoration.

Later, in 1885 during the reign of King Rama V, Lady Sutthi, the wife of Chao Phraya Wichian Siri (Men Na Songkhla) requested royal permission from the King to restore the temple. The temple was then granted a wisungkhammasima (temple boundary stone). The King graciously renamed it Wat Suthi Wararam around the same year. The temple area measures approximately 9 m (29.5 ft) wide and 22 m (72.2 ft) long.

Subsequently, Pan Watcharaphai, a daughter of Lady Sutthi, undertook further restoration of the temple. It later received continued maintenance and support from members of the Na Songkhla family, including Phraya Si Thammathibet (Chit Na Songkhla) and Phraya Manavaratsevi (Plot Wichian Na Songkhla).

The temple is located in a low-lying plain that is prone to flooding. Within the temple grounds, there are several structures, including a Thai-style ordination hall, a wooden sermon hall, a bell tower, a crematorium, and a cemetery.

In terms of education, the temple established a Buddhist scripture school and also contributed to national education by allowing a government secondary school to be established within its grounds (Wat Suthi Wararam School) in 1911.
