= Hainan Science and Technology Museum =

Building in Haikou, China

Coordinates: 20.02092°N 110.21684°E

Hainan Science and Technology Museum 海南科技馆
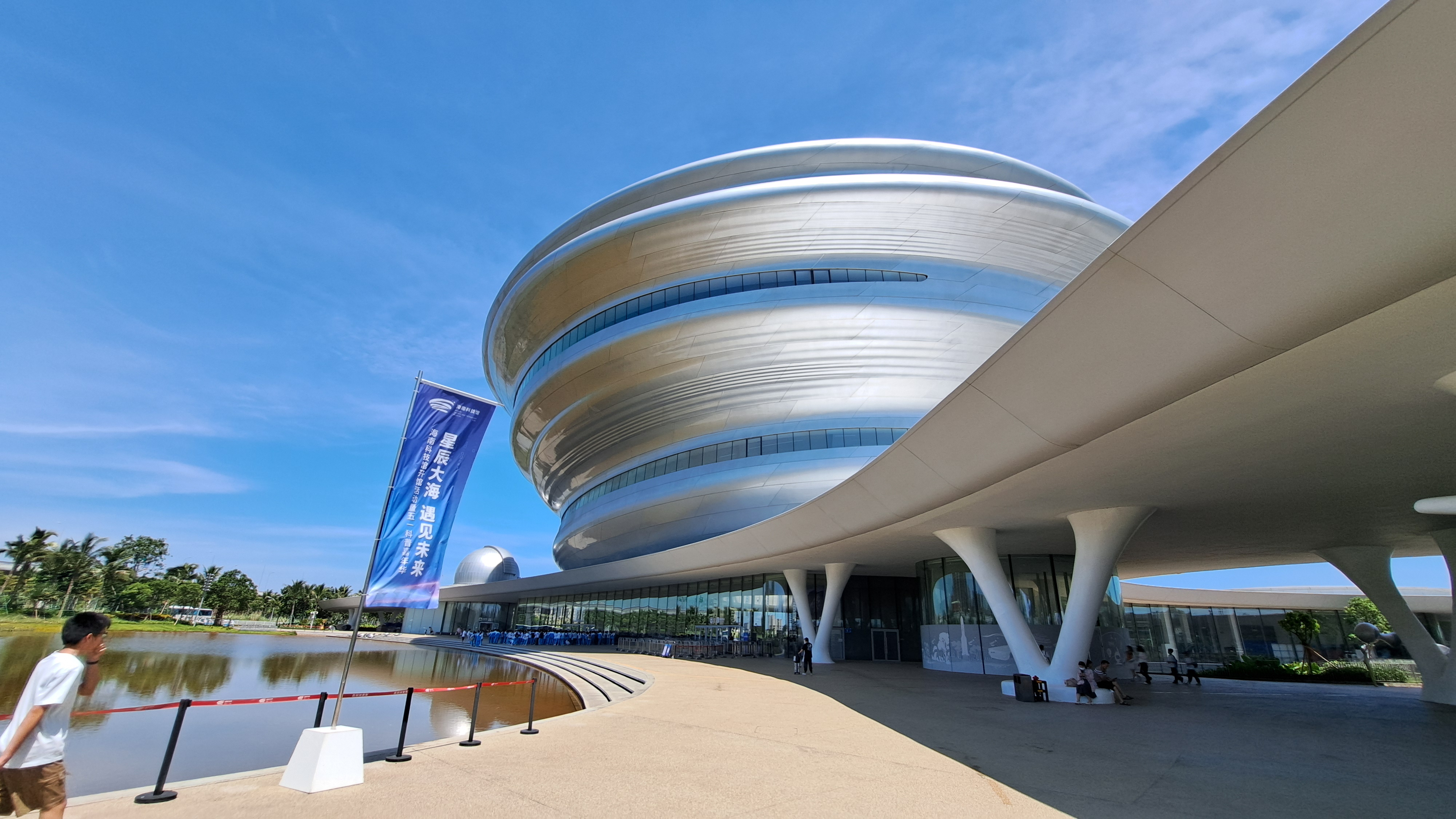
- The museum in May 2026
- Interactive map of Hainan Science and Technology Museum 海南科技馆
- Location: Haikou's west coast area, Hainan, China
- Type: Science museum

Construction
- Built: circa 2025
- Architect: MAD Architects

Website
- https://www.hainanstm.cn/

The Hainan Science and Technology Museum (Chinese: 海南科技馆) is located in Haikou's west coast area, Hainan, China. It was completed in 2025. It is located about 600 metres southeast of the Wuyuan River Stadium.

The building is silver in colour, and has a spiral design with a large open core. The exterior is covered with 843 panels made of fiber-reinforced polymer. It is structurally supported by three core concrete tubes. The building was designed by Ma Yansong and others at his company MAD Architects. The interior contains a planetarium, a large-screen cinema, and other exhibitions. The total area of the building is 45,528 M2. The grounds has a covered plaza and reflecting pool.

Admission is free, but booking is required. Within the first 4 months of opening, the center received about 350,000 visitors, peak times receiving over 5,800 people a day.

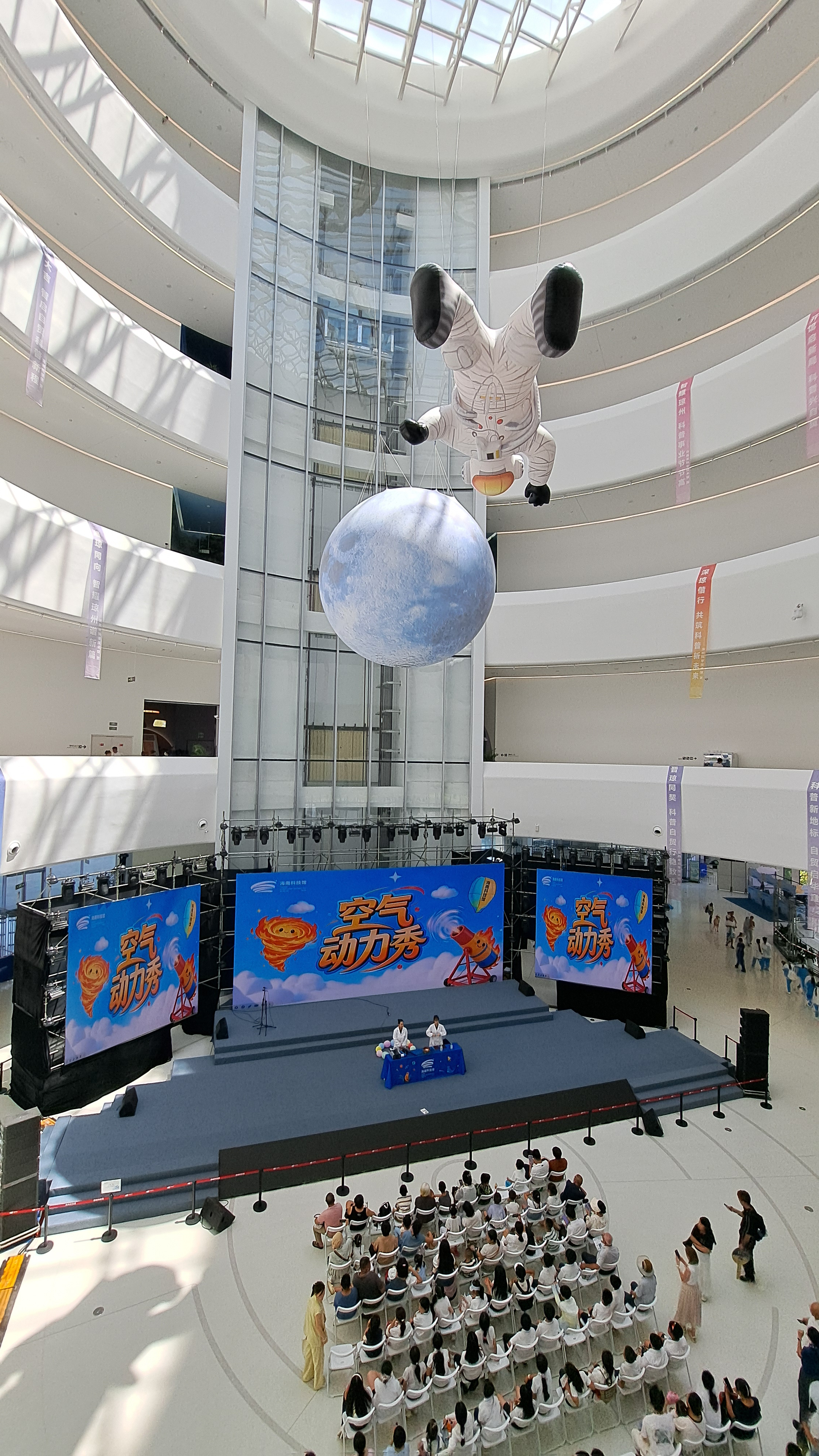
Interior
