= Haikou Yazhou Gu Cheng =

Coordinates: 20°01′07″N 110°18′47″E

- 海口崖州古城
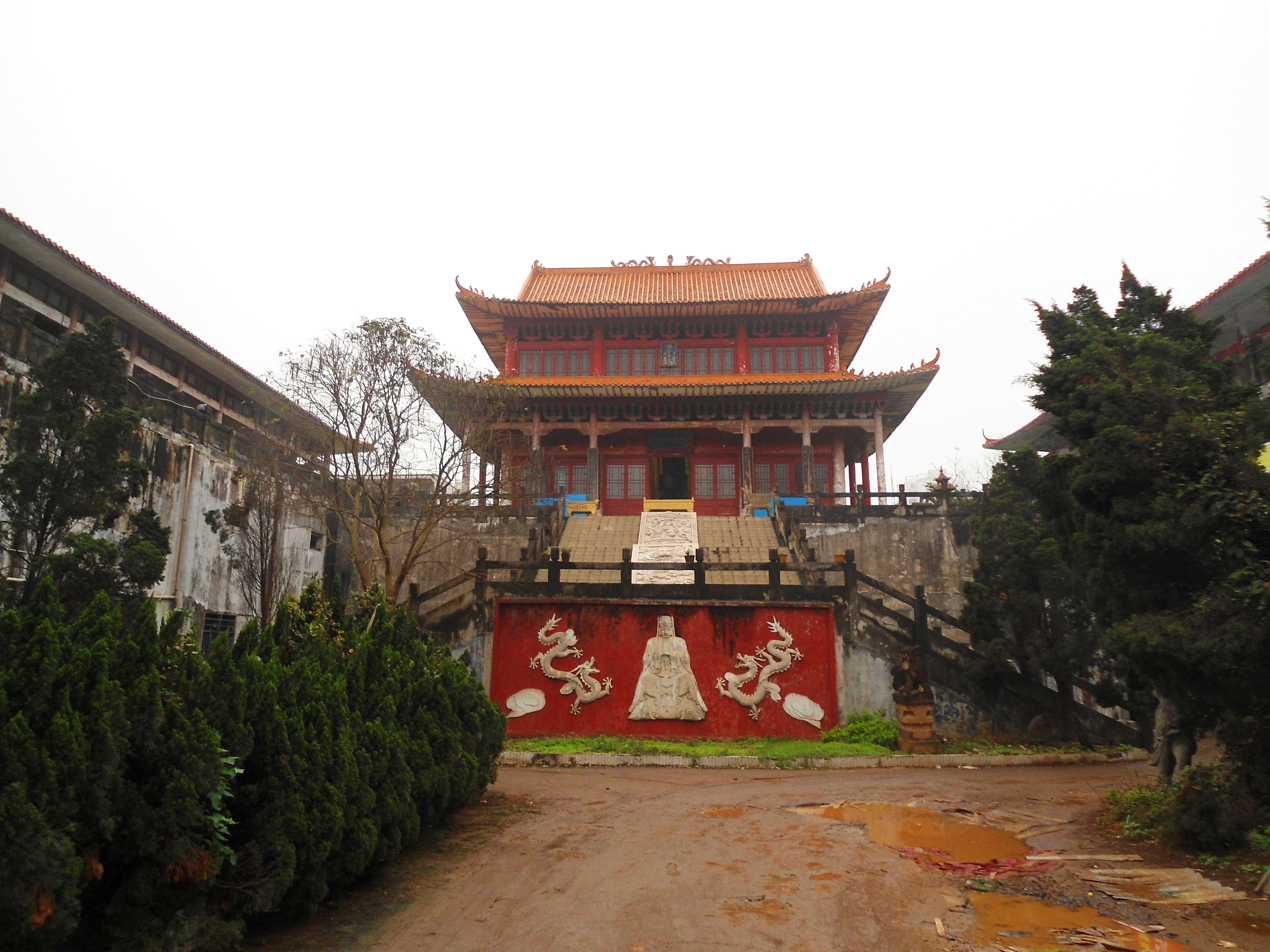
- Interactive map of the Haikou Yazhou Gu Cheng area

General information
- Status: Dilapidated
- Type: Former temple
- Location: Haikou, Hainan, China
- Owner: City of Haikou

Haikou Yazhou Gu Cheng (Chinese: 海口崖州古城) is an unused group of buildings located just north of Haixiu Road, Haikou, Hainan, China. It was once a temple dedicated to a famous general. In 1993 it was expanded. In 1997, due to its dilapidated condition, the tourist department revoked its status as a visitor attraction. On February 27, 2005 there was a massive fire. It remains dilapidated, with parts of it now used for businesses such as auto repair.

There is a similarly named place in Sanya in the south of the province that is unrelated.
