= Haikou =

Prefecture-level city in Hainan, People's Republic of China

Haikou 海口市 Hoihow
- Prefecture-level city
- City of Haikou
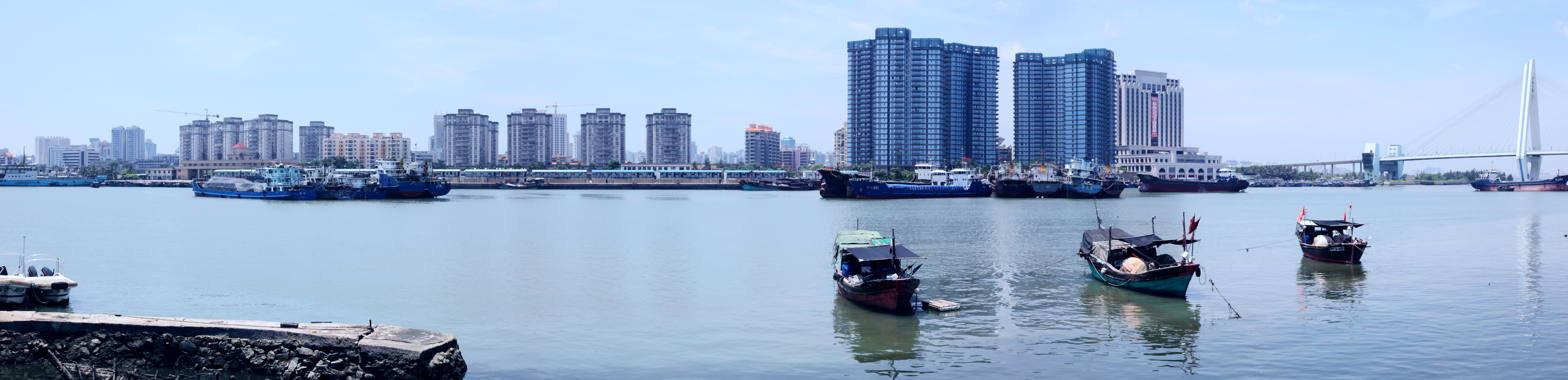
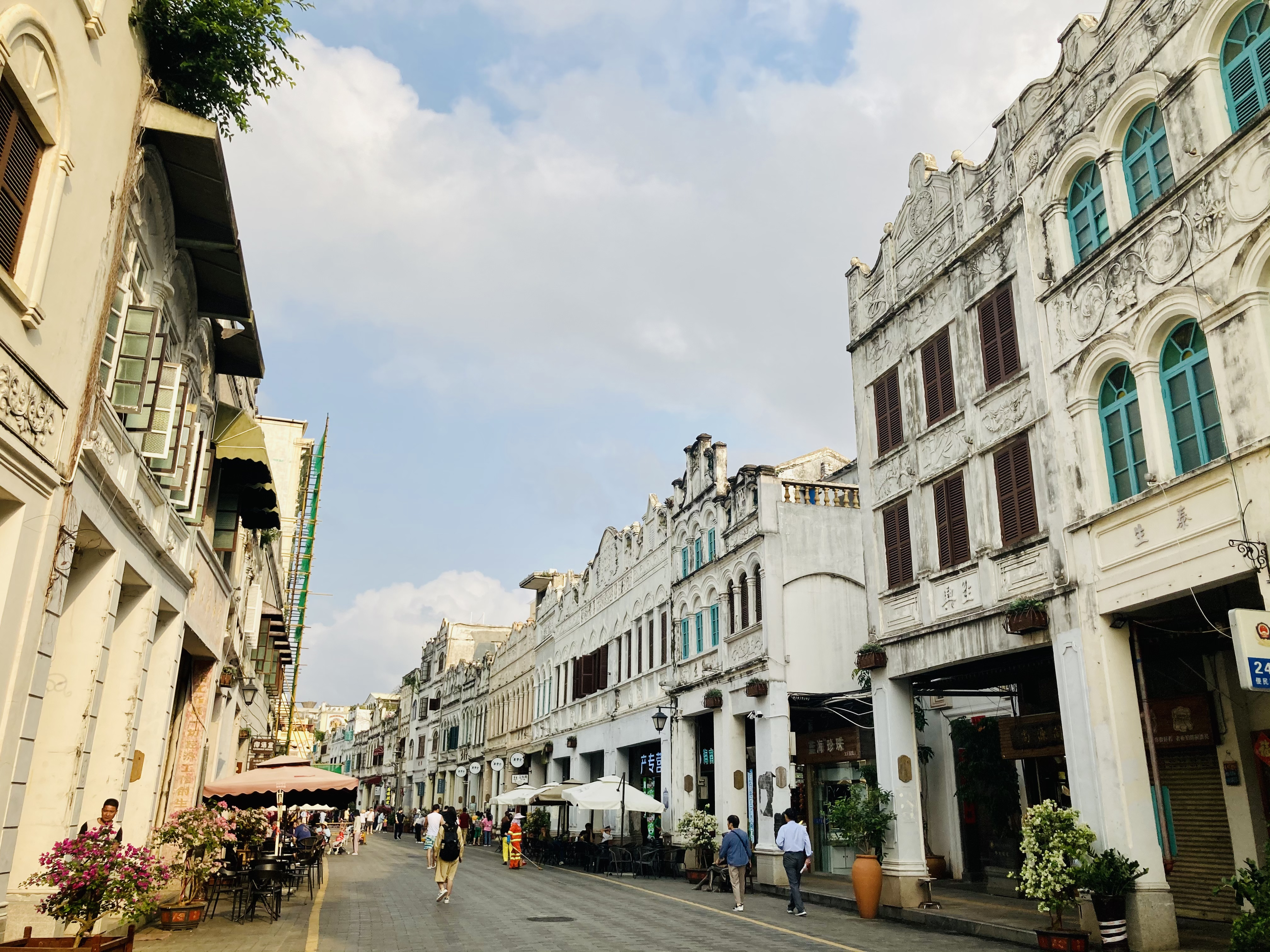
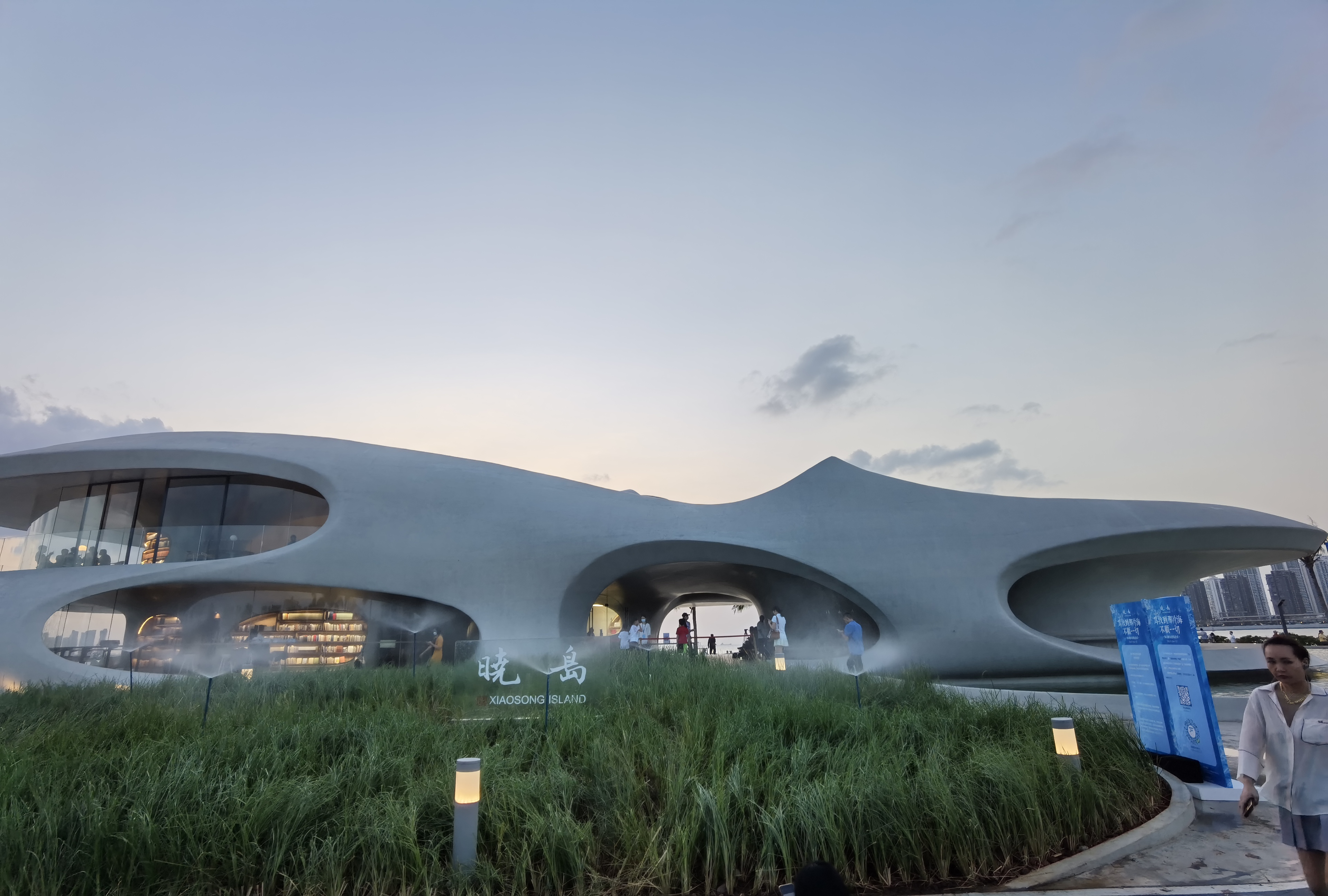
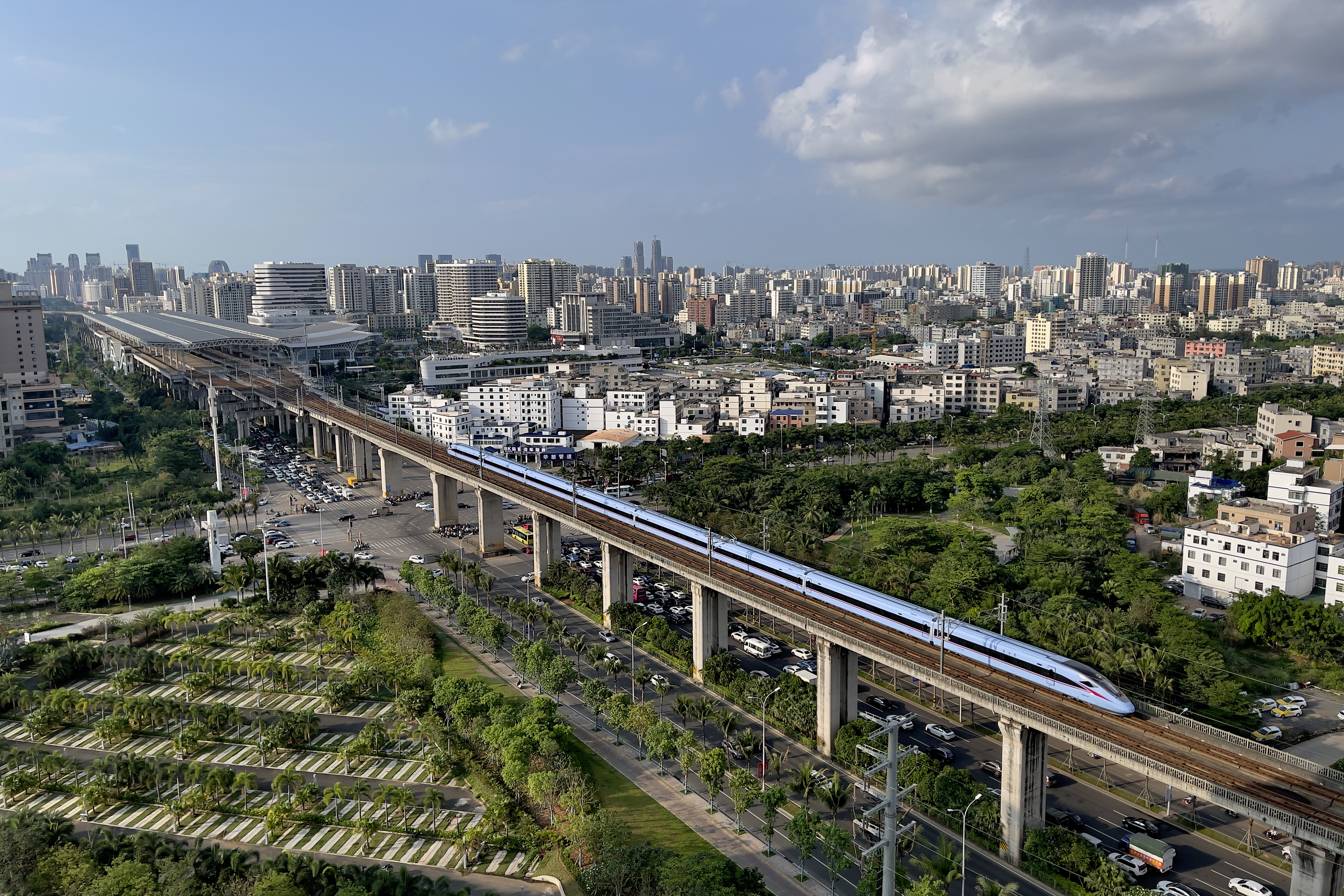
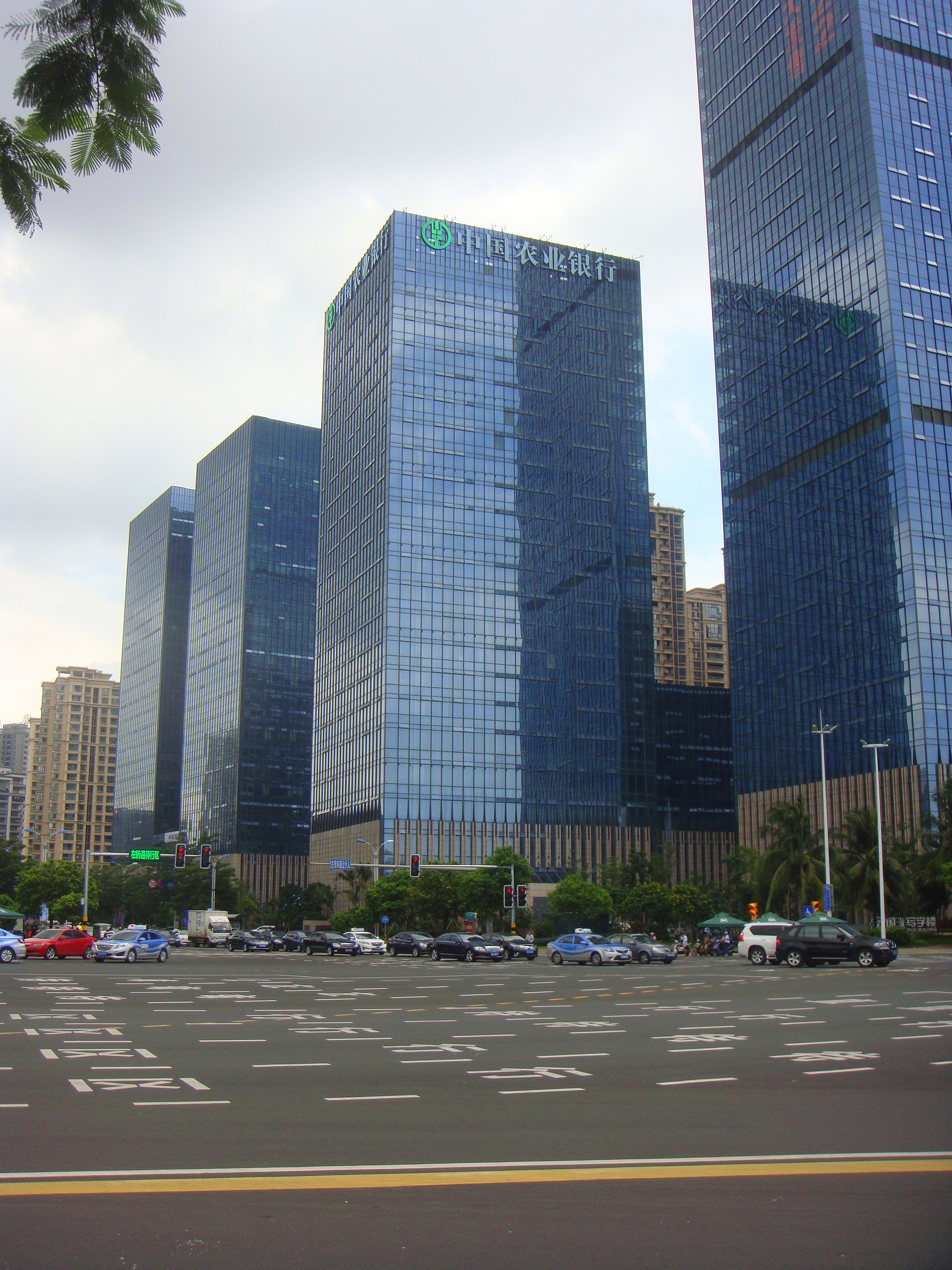
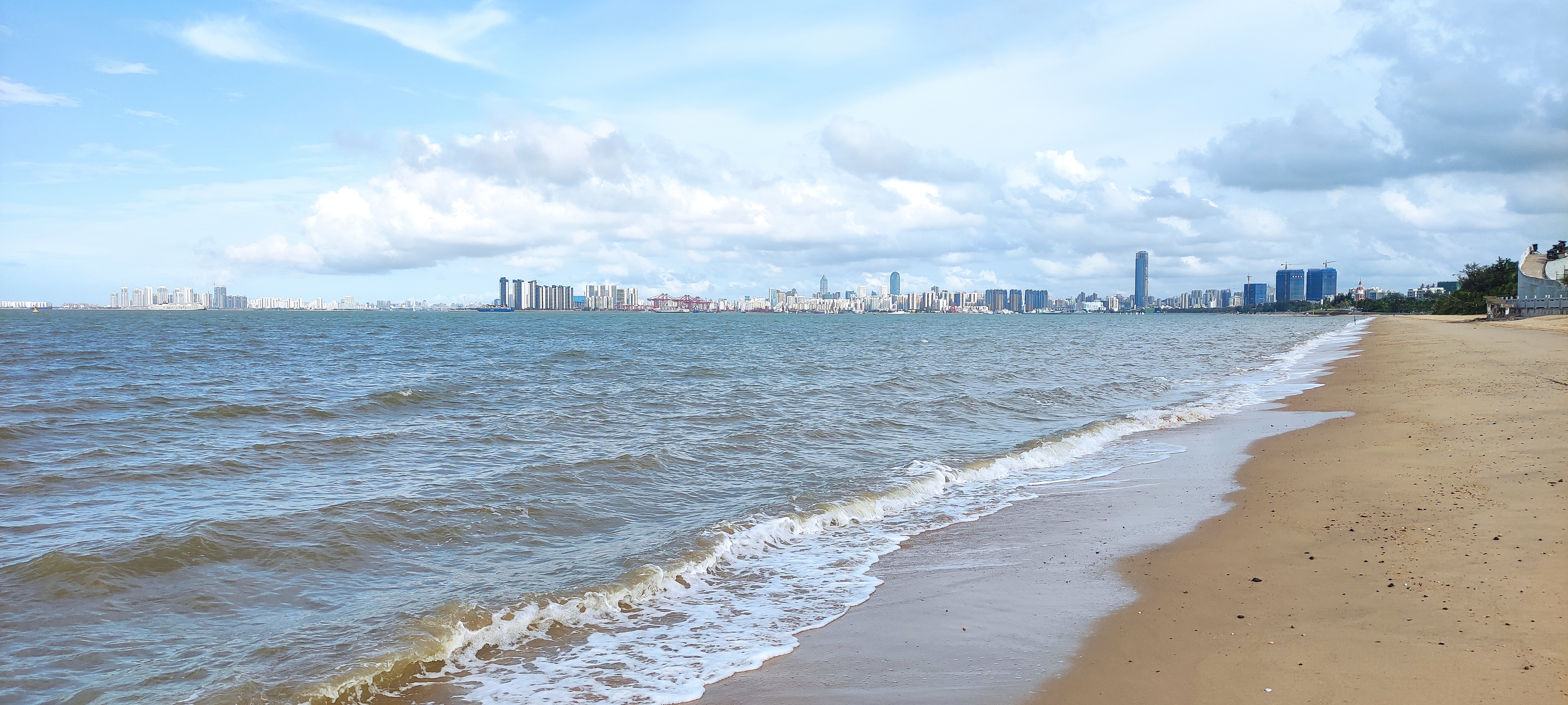
- Haikou Century Bridge on the banks of the Haidian River Qilou buildings in the Bo'ai Road area Haikou Wormhole Library Hainan Eastern Ring High-Speed Railway International Tourism Island CBD on Guoxing Avenue Holiday Beach
- Nickname: Coconut City (椰城)
- Interactive map of Haikou
- Location of the city centre in Hainan
- Coordinates (Hainan People's Government): 20°01′07″N 110°20′56″E
- Country: China
- Province: Hainan

Government
  - Type: Prefecture-level city
  - Body: Haikou Municipal People's Congress
  - CCP Committee Secretary: Ding Hui; Acting
  - Congress Chairman: Han Yingwei
  - Mayor: Ding Hui
  - CPPCC Chairman: Guo Yanhong

Area
  - Prefecture-level city: 2,237 km^{2} (864 sq mi)
  - Urban (2018): 427 km^{2} (165 sq mi)
  - Metro: 2,280 km^{2} (880 sq mi)

Population (2020 Census)
  - Prefecture-level city: 3,001,600
  - Density: 1,342/km^{2} (3,475/sq mi)
  - Urban (2018): 2,250,000
  - Urban density: 5,270/km^{2} (13,600/sq mi)
  - Metro: 2,046,189
  - Metro density: 897/km^{2} (2,320/sq mi)

GDP
  - Prefecture-level city: CN¥ 235.8 billion US$ 33.4 billion
  - Per capita: CN¥ 80,837; US$ 11,408
- Time zone: UTC+08:00 (China Standard)
- Postal code: 570000
- Area code: 898
- ISO 3166 code: CN-HI-01
- Website: haikou.gov.cn

Haikou
- "Haikou", as written in Chinese
- Chinese: 海口
- Postal: Hoihow
- Literal meaning: Mouth of the sea
Transcriptions
Standard Mandarin
- Hanyu Pinyin: Hǎikǒu
Yue: Cantonese
- Jyutping: hoi^{2}hau^{2}
Southern Min
- Hokkien POJ: Hái-kháu
- Hainanese Romanization: Hái-khāu

Haikou (Note: /haɪ.ˈkoʊ/; Chinese: 海口; pinyin: Hǎikǒu; formerly romanized as Hoihow) is the capital and most populous city of the Chinese province of Hainan. Haikou city is situated on the northern coast of Hainan, by the mouth of the Nandu River. The northern part of the city is on the Haidian Island, which is separated from the main part of Haikou by the Haidian River, a branch of the Nandu. Administratively, Haikou is a prefecture-level city, comprising four districts, and covering 2,280 square kilometres (880 sq mi). There are 2,046,189 inhabitants in the built-up area, all living within the four urban districts of the city.

Haikou was originally a port city, serving as the port for Qiongshan. During the Chinese Civil War, Haikou was one of the last Nationalist strongholds to be taken by the Communists with the Battle of Hainan Island in 1950. Currently, more than half of the island's total trade still goes through Haikou's ports.

The city is home to Hainan University, a comprehensive research university under the Project 211 and the Double First Class University Plan in certain disciplines, which has its main campus on Haidian Island.

== History ==
Haikou's Qilou Old Street (骑楼老街) in the Bo'ai Road area features arcaded buildings blending Southern Chinese and colonial styles, reflecting its history as a treaty port.

The hanzi characters comprising the city's name, 海口, mean ocean/sea and mouth/port, respectively. Thus, the name "Haikou" is also a word for "seaport" – similar to Portsmouth in Britain. Haikou originally served as the port for Qiongshan, the ancient administrative capital of Hainan island, located some 5 km (3.1 mi) inland to the south east. During its early history Haikou was a part of Guangdong province. In the 13th century it was fortified and became a military post under the Ming dynasty (1368–1644). The port is located west of the mouth of the Nandu River, Hainan's principal river. When Qiongshan was opened to foreign trade under the Treaty of Tianjin in 1858, Haikou started to rival the old administrative city. It was formerly known internationally as 'Hoihow', based on the Cantonese pronunciation by the British Raj officers. In 1926, Haikou overtook Qiongshan in population and it was declared a separate administrative city.

The city and island of Hainan stayed under the control of the Nationalists until April 1950, when it fell to the Communists during the Landing Operation on Hainan Island.

Since 1949, Haikou has maintained its position as Hainan's main port, handling more than half of the island's total trade. It has replaced Qiongshan as the island's administrative capital. In 1988, Haikou was made a prefecture-level city as well as the capital of the newly created Hainan Province.

Haikou old town contains a small portion of the oldest buildings in Haikou city that returnees from overseas built. The houses are a mixture of styles, including Portuguese, French, and Southeast Asian. The streets used to be divided into different areas selling Chinese and Western medicine, for silk and bespoke clothes, one for fresh fish and meat, and others for the sale of incense, candles, paper, ink, and other goods.

Various projects are currently under discussion to decide the best way to restore and preserve these historical buildings.

== Geography ==
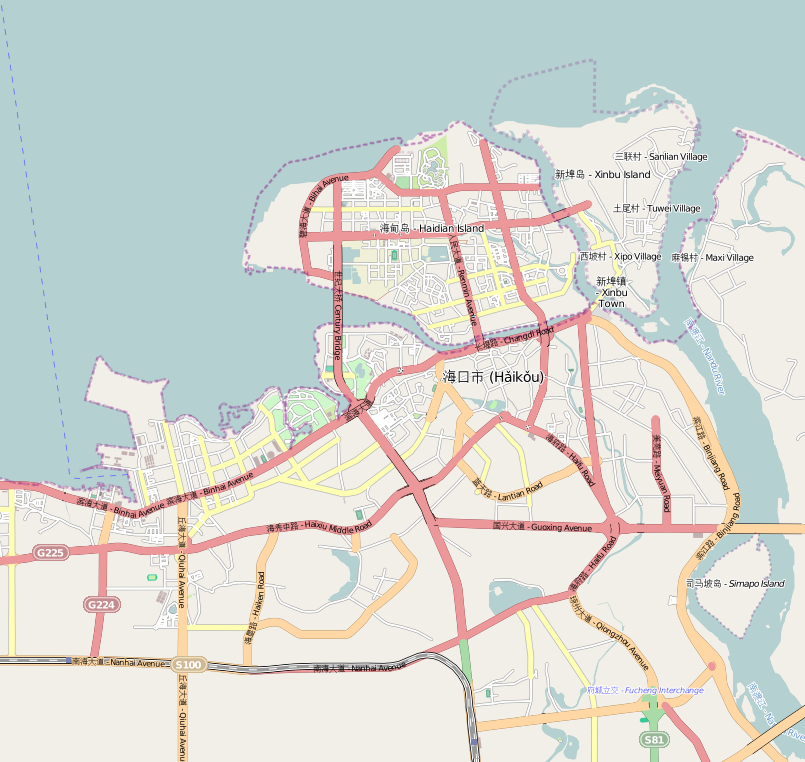
Haikou city map

Haikou is situated on the north coast of Hainan Island, by Haikou Bay, facing the Leizhou Peninsula across the Qiongzhou Strait that stretches west from Beibu Bay near Vietnam to the James Shoal bordering the South China Sea to the west. Most of the city is almost completely flat and only a few metres above sea level. It has an area of 2,304.84 km^{2} (889.90 sq mi). The Meishe River winds through the east side of the city flowing northward to the Haidian River.

The northern part of Haikou City, the district of Haidian Island, is separated from the main part of Haikou by the Haidian River, a tributary of the Nandu River. The district is accessed by one of four bridges, the largest being Haikou Century Bridge, which connects the Guomao district with Haidian Island at the estuary of the Haidian River. From east to west the remaining three road connections are provided by the Renmin, Heping and Xinbu Bridges.

Directly to the northeast of Haikou and to the east of Haidian Island is Xinbu Island.

=== Climate ===
Haikou is on the northern tropical zone, and is part of the Intertropical Convergence Zone. April to October is the active period for tropical storms and typhoons, most of which occur between August and September. May to October is the rainy season with the heaviest rainfall occurring in September. The city has a tropical wet and dry climate (Köppen Aw). Extremes since 1951 have ranged from 2.8 °C (37 °F) on 12 January 1955 to 41.3 °C (106 °F) on 30 April 2024.

Climate data for Haikou, elevation 64 m (210 ft), (1991–2020 normals, extremes 1951–present)
Month	Jan	Feb	Mar	Apr	May	Jun	Jul	Aug	Sep	Oct	Nov	Dec	Year
Record high °C (°F)	33.5 (92.3)	37.2 (99.0)	38.4 (101.1)	41.3 (106.3)	39.2 (102.6)	38.4 (101.1)	38.7 (101.7)	37.6 (99.7)	36.0 (96.8)	34.5 (94.1)	34.7 (94.5)	31.5 (88.7)	41.3 (106.3)
Mean daily maximum °C (°F)	21.3 (70.3)	23.0 (73.4)	26.6 (79.9)	30.2 (86.4)	32.5 (90.5)	33.6 (92.5)	33.4 (92.1)	32.5 (90.5)	31.1 (88.0)	28.9 (84.0)	26.1 (79.0)	22.4 (72.3)	28.5 (83.2)
Daily mean °C (°F)	18.2 (64.8)	19.3 (66.7)	22.4 (72.3)	25.6 (78.1)	27.9 (82.2)	28.9 (84.0)	28.9 (84.0)	28.3 (82.9)	27.6 (81.7)	25.9 (78.6)	23.2 (73.8)	19.6 (67.3)	24.7 (76.4)
Mean daily minimum °C (°F)	16.1 (61.0)	17.1 (62.8)	19.9 (67.8)	22.9 (73.2)	25.0 (77.0)	25.9 (78.6)	25.8 (78.4)	25.6 (78.1)	25.0 (77.0)	23.5 (74.3)	21.1 (70.0)	17.7 (63.9)	22.1 (71.8)
Record low °C (°F)	2.8 (37.0)	6.5 (43.7)	6.4 (43.5)	9.8 (49.6)	16.3 (61.3)	21.2 (70.2)	21.0 (69.8)	21.7 (71.1)	17.5 (63.5)	14.1 (57.4)	10.0 (50.0)	5.3 (41.5)	2.8 (37.0)
Average precipitation mm (inches)	23.5 (0.93)	29.9 (1.18)	42.9 (1.69)	80.0 (3.15)	191.4 (7.54)	238.9 (9.41)	247.6 (9.75)	293.0 (11.54)	268.8 (10.58)	274.1 (10.79)	59.6 (2.35)	38.3 (1.51)	1,788 (70.42)
Average precipitation days (≥ 0.1 mm)	8.6	9.1	9.6	10.3	15.2	16.5	16.3	15.6	14.1	11.4	8.4	8.3	143.4
Average relative humidity (%)	85	86	84	82	81	80	80	82	82	79	80	80	82
Mean monthly sunshine hours	91.5	97.0	128.5	160.4	208.5	211.7	230.6	210.0	174.5	165.7	121.0	95.5	1,894.9
Percentage possible sunshine	27	30	34	42	51	53	57	53	48	46	36	28	42
Source: China Meteorological Administration all-time extreme temperatureall-time August recordall-time March record

=== Environment ===
As of 2018, Haikou has the second best air quality among major cities nationally, preceded only by Lhasa, Tibet. However, since approximately 2009, due to an increase in the number of automobiles, there has been somewhat worsening air pollution.

According to the 2005 statistical book issued by the National Bureau of Statistics, Haikou scored the highest among China's main cities in air quality, with 366 days (2004) of ambient air quality equal to or above grade II, with only 0.033 milligrams/m^{2} of particulate matter (the least of all main cities), 0.003 milligrams/m^{2} of sulphur dioxide (only Lhasa had less), and 0.013 milligrams/m^{2} of nitrogen dioxide (the least of all main cities).

In 1995, the Haikou city government began an initiative to improve the quality of life for its residents. With the approval of the World Health Organization, and Ministry of Health, a ten-point plan was undertaken to address such issues as:

- Community health care
- Vaccinations for children
- Waste recycling
- Green belts and urban trees
- Environmentally friendly construction
- Public toilets (These are available throughout the city, are staffed, and well maintained.)
- Sewage treatment
- Communications
- Noise pollution

The groundwater is of international standard, and is classified as mineral water.

By 2004, the city had established 43 new community health service centers reaching 85 percent of the population. The initiative has increased the size of Haikou's green spaces to 2,000 hectares, with trees lining 40 percent of its roads. Noise pollution has dropped from 61.1db to 58.2db and 300 public toilets have been built. All industrial effluents, industrial waste water and solid waste, and all live sewage, is now processed through centralized treatment centers, and is disposed of without environmental impact. These improvements and others have increased life expectancy in Haikou to 78.26 years.

Haikou city has also built 163 model ecological villages. Now, over 200,000 villagers in 933 villages have tap water in their homes.

==== Comprehensive city-improvement campaign ====
During 2015 and 2016, large-scale city improvements have taken place as part of a province-wide initiative called "double create" (双创). It is described by government sources as a campaign to create a cleaner city and create a more civilized city. It is focused on traffic and commerce, but has also improved the overall appearance of the city, tackling air pollution from industry emissions, aiming to ensure the safety of drinking water sources, improving public security in such places as hospitals, schools, malls, and visitor attractions. Details of these improvements include:

- Traffic: Many new street crossings with traffic lights were installed around the city to improve two-wheel vehicles (consisting mainly of electric motorbikes) and pedestrian travel. Throughout the city, teams of police have been stationed at major intersections to ensure that two-wheel vehicles obey the law. Although there are many side lanes for these bikes, the actual pedestrian sidewalks serve as legal, one-way routes. Police at intersections stop vehicles either going the wrong way, or running red lights and the offenders may be forced to wear a red sash, stop other offenders, and lecture them.
- Commerce: Around August 2015, teams of officers physically removed nearly all illegal structures used for business in the city (a province-wide campaign) which were commonly made of corrugated metal or cinderblocks and were shop extensions or simply unused space that had been built upon. Street vendors were banned (most of whom sold vegetables or fruit), as was the night operation of roadside BBQ sites and the placement of tables onto the sidewalks by restaurants. These night time food operations were once common throughout the city.
- Roads and sidewalks: Many small roads have been repaved including narrow lanes in old neighbourhoods. Also, many sidewalks have been upgraded with new brick. Bricks are used as sidewalk material in Haikou because of the large amount of ficus trees, the roots of which deform the surrounding sidewalk.
- Demolition and reconstruction: A number of entire neighbourhoods within the city have been, and are being, entirely demolished with new buildings and roads being built.
- Starting around the beginning of 2018, the city government funded painting and cladding of a number of buildings in the city centre.

=== Water and sewage treatment ===
The treatment of Haikou's wastewater, and the supply of tap water is operated by the French company Veolia Water. The partial privatization agreement gives 49 percent ownership to Veolia Water in a 30-year joint venture with Haikou Water Group (2012–2042).

== Demographics ==
According to the 2010 Census, the prefecture-level city of Haikou has a registered population of 2,046,189 inhabitants, 537,848 more than the population declared on the past census in 2000. The average annual population growth during the period 2000–2010 was of 3.1 percent. Most of the population of Haikou are Han Chinese (around 97.75 percent, according to the 2010 Census).

== Subdivisions ==
=== Districts ===
Haikou is divided in four districts. The information presented here uses 2010 Census data.

Map
District	Simplified Chinese	Hanyu Pinyin	Area (km^{2})	Population (2010)	Density (/km^{2})
Longhua	龙华区	Lónghuá Qū	275	593,018	2,156
Xiuying	秀英区	Xiùyīng Qū	512	349,544	683
Qiongshan	琼山区	Qióngshān Qū	940	479,960	511
Meilan	美兰区	Měilán Qū	553	623,667	1128

=== Neighbourhoods ===
There are several distinct neighborhoods within the city, including:

==== Guomao ====
Guomao is a relatively affluent area located on the coast between Longquan Road to the east running west for more than one kilometre. The west part of this area has experienced substantial development since about 2007, and now contains dozens of newly built high-rise residential apartment buildings.

==== Bo'ai Road ====
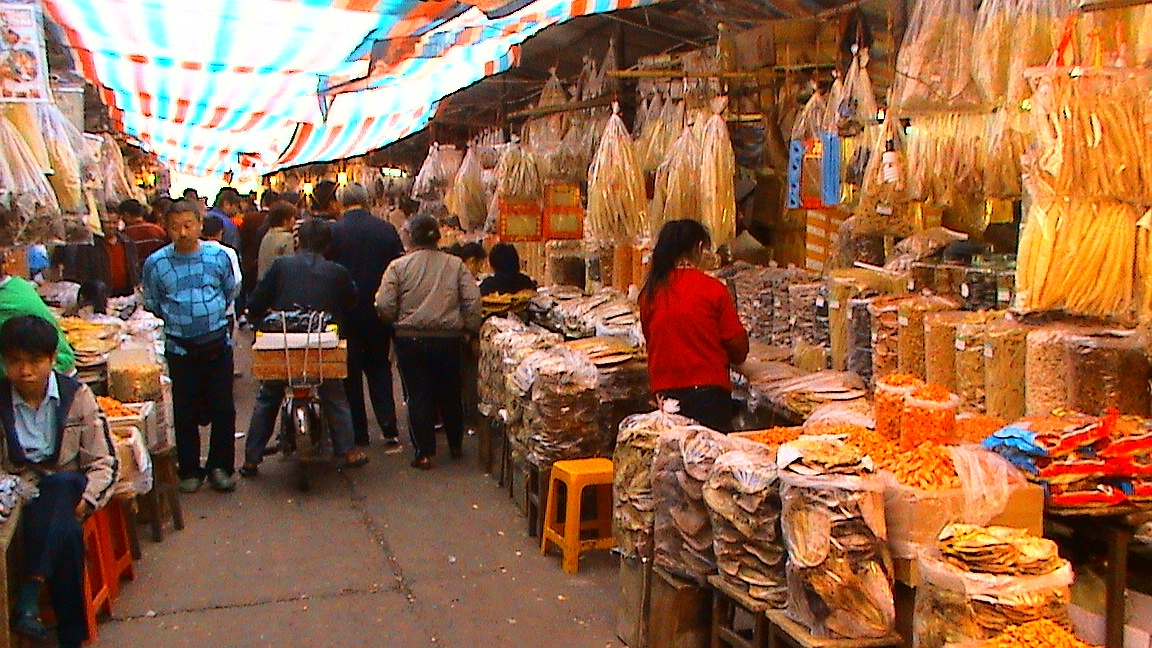
Shopping street in Bo'ai Road area (French colonial district)

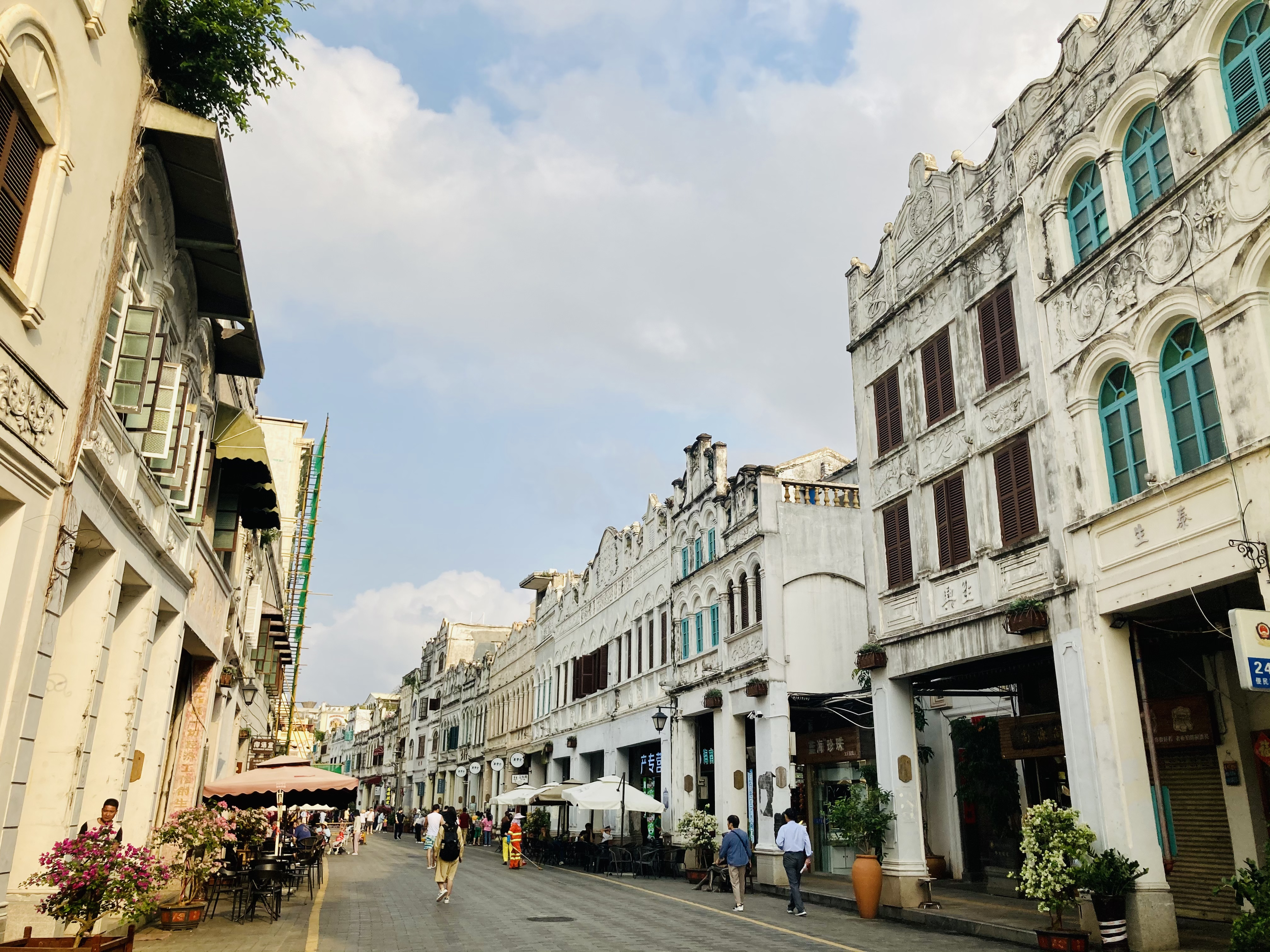
Old town of Haikou, 2021

This historical area is located on the south side of the Haidian River, at the northern part of mainland Haikou. Much of the area comprises arcade style, dilapidated buildings with European fusion-type architectural facades with Indian and Arabic influences. The buildings are almost all painted white, and are usually no more than a few storeys tall. The eastern part of the area is mainly residential. The western part contains hubs for such items as exotic foods, pets, and fabrics. The building facades and roads have been restored in most of the area, Zhongshan Road being the most notable.

==== Hainan University area ====
Located on Haidian Island, this area comprises the entire portion of the island west of its main north–south road, Renmin Dadao. It appears similar to a typical student ghetto, containing many small, inexpensive food stands and restaurants.

==== Haikou West Coast ====
Haikou West Coast is a residential neighbourhood in Xiuying District around 7 km west of downtown Haikou. Located within this neighbourhood are Hainan International Convention And Exhibition Center, Wuyuan River Stadium, Hainan Science and Technology Museum and a number of government offices.

=== Parks and recreational areas ===
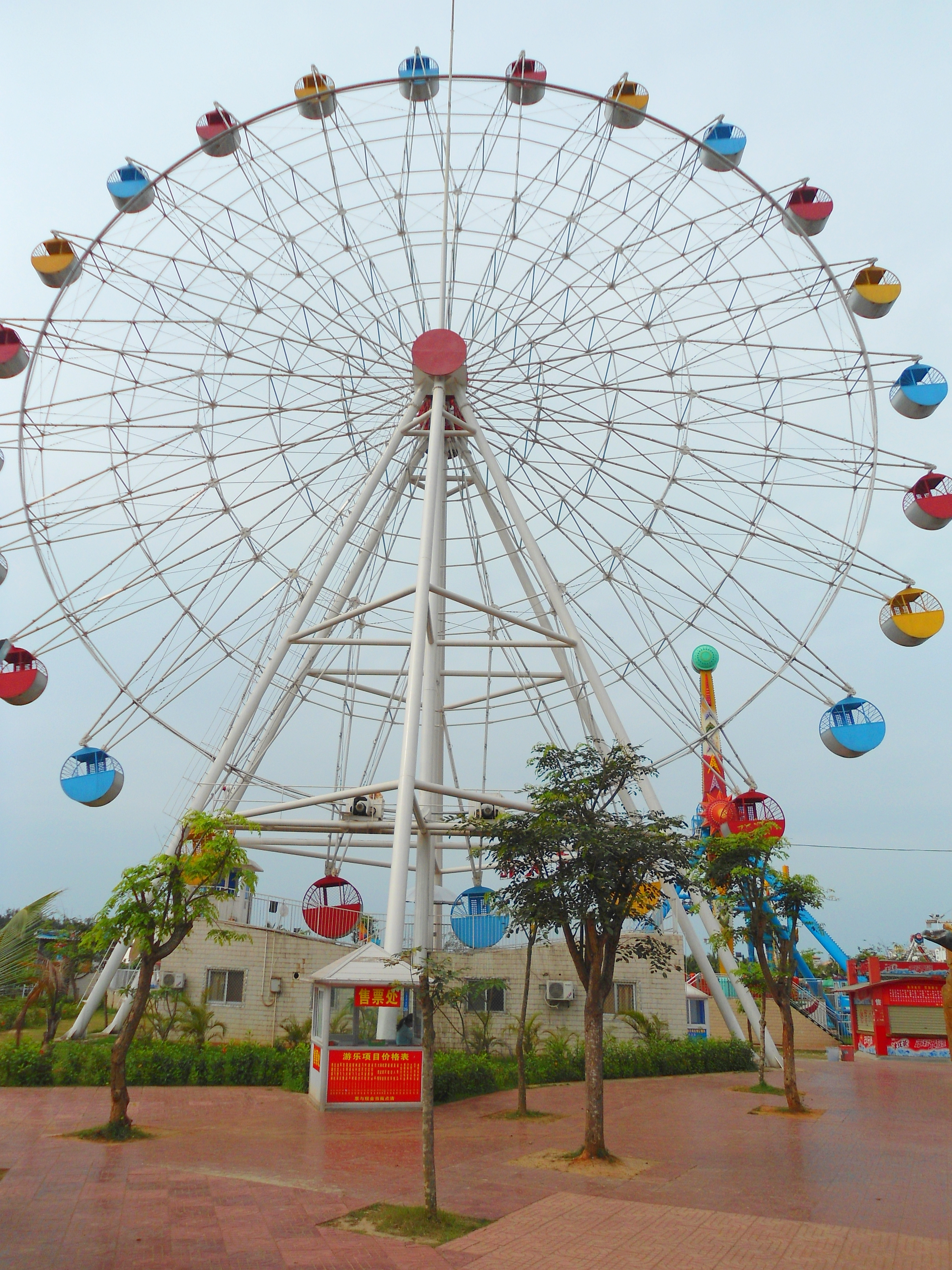
The ferris wheel at Baishamen Park

- Evergreen Park is a 71.3 hectare park located on Binhai Road about 200 m west of the southern foot of Haikou Century Bridge. It is the largest park in Haikou, containing approximately ten thousand coconut trees and several hundred species of South Asian ornamental plants, however, most of the park consists of grassy fields.
- Baishamen Park (White Sand Gate Park) was created in 2010 and is located on the north shore of Haidian Island. The park contains a small amusement park, and consists mostly of grass fields, with little tree cover.
- Changying Global 100 Fantasty Park is an under-construction amusement park around 12 km west of downtown Haikou.
- Golden Bull Mountain Ridge Park (Jinniuling Park) includes a small zoo, a lake, diverse flora, and a high percentage of forest areas, including a large bamboo forest. It is located on Haixiu Road, west of Longquan Road, the main north–south avenue in Haikou.
- Binhai Park is located east of Evergreen Park. There is a bougainvillea hybrid exhibition held each year. This park has a small lake and building used for community purposes in the middle.
- Haikou People's Park is a recently refurbished park located in the downtown area on Haixiu Road next to East Lake. The park draws large numbers of people each morning who engage in exercises, predominantly tai chi, fitness dancing, and aerobics.
- Hainan International Friendship Park is planned to occupy 180,000 square metres (1,900,000 sq ft) of land, with a length of over 2,000 metres (6,600 ft).
- Hongcheng Lake (红城湖) is one of the largest water bodies in the city being around equal in size to the lake at Golden Bull Mountain Ridge Park. It has three islands, the largest of which contains a defunct hotel. The lake is a popular location for fishermen. At night, hawker stalls are set up along the roadsides for tourists and locals to drink and dine.
- Holiday Beach is a 7-kilometre (4.3-mile)-long beach and visitor attraction adjacent to the west side of Haikou.
- Dongzhai Port Nature Reserve lies some 15 kilometres (9.3 mi) south east of Haikou and was the first protected mangrove forest zone in China.
- Meishe River National Wetland Park, an eco-park located on the Meishe River

=== Other notable locations ===
- Zhongjie Road (忠介路), a shopping street with a long history
- Jiefang East Road, a busy shopping street located west of the Bo'ai Road area
- Guoxing Avenue, a main east–west street with many notable buildings
- The Hainan Center is an under-construction supertall skyscraper. Located on Guoxing Avenue at Haifu Road, it will be 94-storeys, and is scheduled for completion late 2027.

== Economy ==
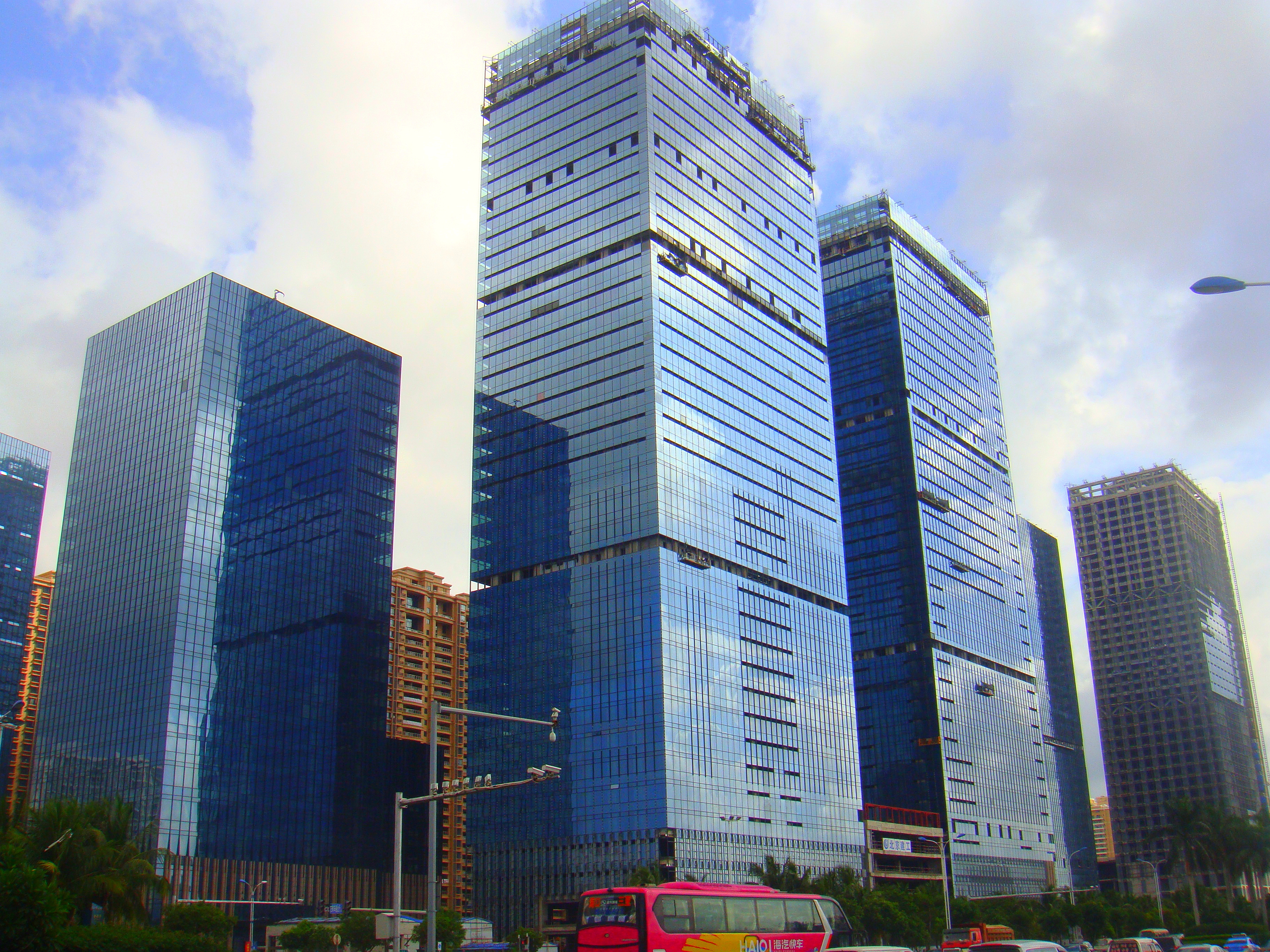
The new International Tourism and Central Business District on Guoxing Avenue

The GDP per capita was US$3,573 in 2008, ranked number 43 among 659 Chinese cities. In 2011, the city's GDP reached 71.3 billion yuan, amounting to about 30 percent of the province's total.

Haikou exports substantial quantities of agricultural produce and livestock. There is a small amount of industry, including canning, textiles, rice hulling, and light engineering.

The "International Tourism and Central Business District" is under construction on the west part of Guoxing Avenue. The road was once only home to government buildings. Starting around 2011, HNA and other groups began erecting office buildings. Also located at the western end of Guoxing is the HNA Building, the headquarters of Hainan Airlines.

Near the southern end of Haikou, automotive manufacturer Haima Automobile has its global headquarters.

The Haikou Free Trade Zone (Haikou FTZ) (海口保税区) is a state-level, 1.93 km^{2} area located between Nanhai Road and Yehai Road. It was approved on October 21, 1992, by the State Council.

== Education ==
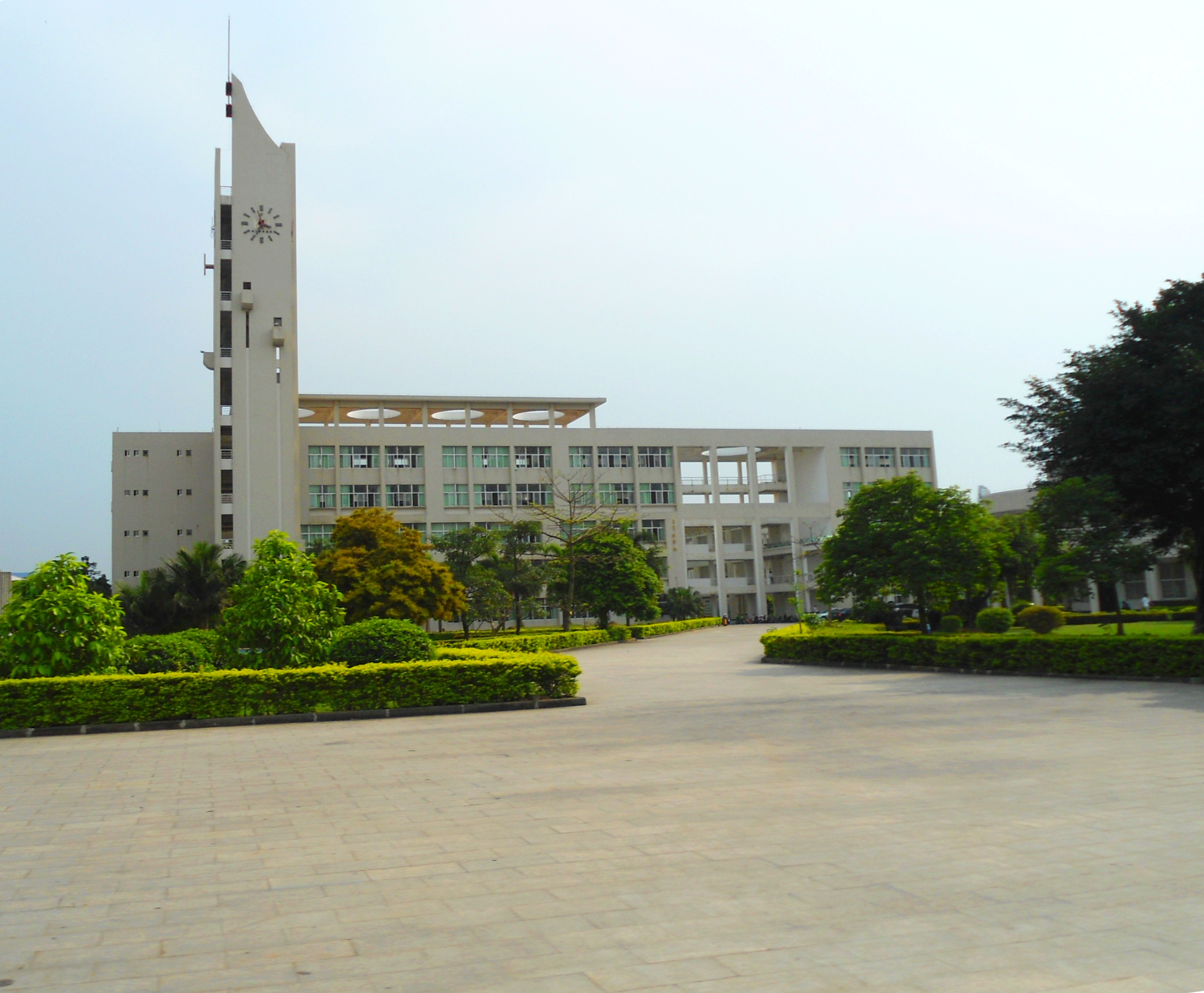
Hainan University just inside the north gate.

Several major educational institutions are located in Haikou:

- Hainan University has its main campus on Haikou's Haidian Island, with the South China Tropical Agricultural University, now part of the university, located in the southern part of the city.
- Hainan Normal University is the oldest institution for higher learning, with a new campus in Guilinyang. It has an enrolment of more than 20,000, including approximately 200 foreigner students.
- Hainan Medical College, founded in 1993, offers degrees in medicine. It is located in the southern part of the city.
- Qiongtai Normal University is located in Qiongshan District, with a new campus in Guilinyang.
- Haikou College of Economics, located by Guoxing Avenue, with a new campus in Guilinyang.
- Chinese Academy of Tropical Agricultural Sciences is located across the road from Hainan Medical College.
- Hainan Middle School

== Transportation ==
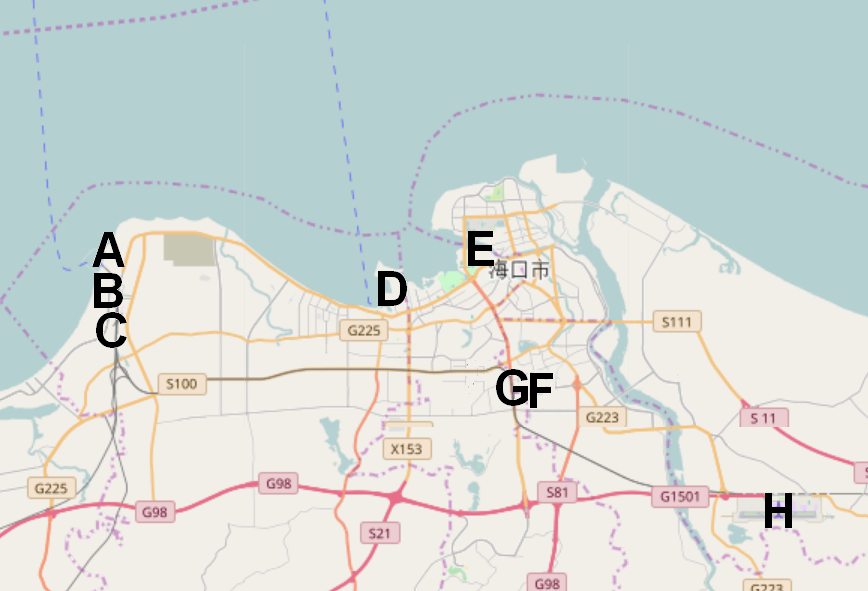
Main transportation hubs in Haikou: A: Haikou Port New Seaport area; B: South Port; C: Haikou Railway Station; D: Haikou Port Xiuying Port area; E: Haikou New Port; F: Haikou Transportation Center (main bus station); G: Haikou East Railway Station; H: Haikou Meilan International Airport

=== Urban ===
Haikou has an extensive urban bus service. Standard fare is 1 yuan, with no bus pass, ticket, or transfer system in place. Urban minibuses operated prior to 2009, but have since been phased-out. Taxi automobiles and electric motorbikes operate throughout the city. During 2009–2010, petrol-fueled motorbike taxis were banned and seized by police at numerous checkpoints within the city.

Haikou has experienced a substantial increase in cars since the early 2000s. Traffic on main streets, once light, is now similar to other major cities, with rush hour problems that have prompted the city to expand several main roads and build a new elevated road from the west end of Guoxing Avenue to new developments west of Holiday Beach.

Many main roads in the city have a side lane, separated by a median, for two-wheeled vehicles.

Physical barriers were installed on many of the main two-way streets throughout the city in order to separate opposing lanes. These were installed for safety reasons to prevent pedestrians from crossing the streets at locations other than intersections.

Roundabouts are not prevalent in Haikou, being used mainly on Hai Xiu road, and a few other locations.

Traffic cameras are used at many main intersections in the city, with tickets being issued by post for traffic light infractions.

There is one tunnel in the city, the Qiaozhong Road Tunnel.

==== Shared bicycles ====
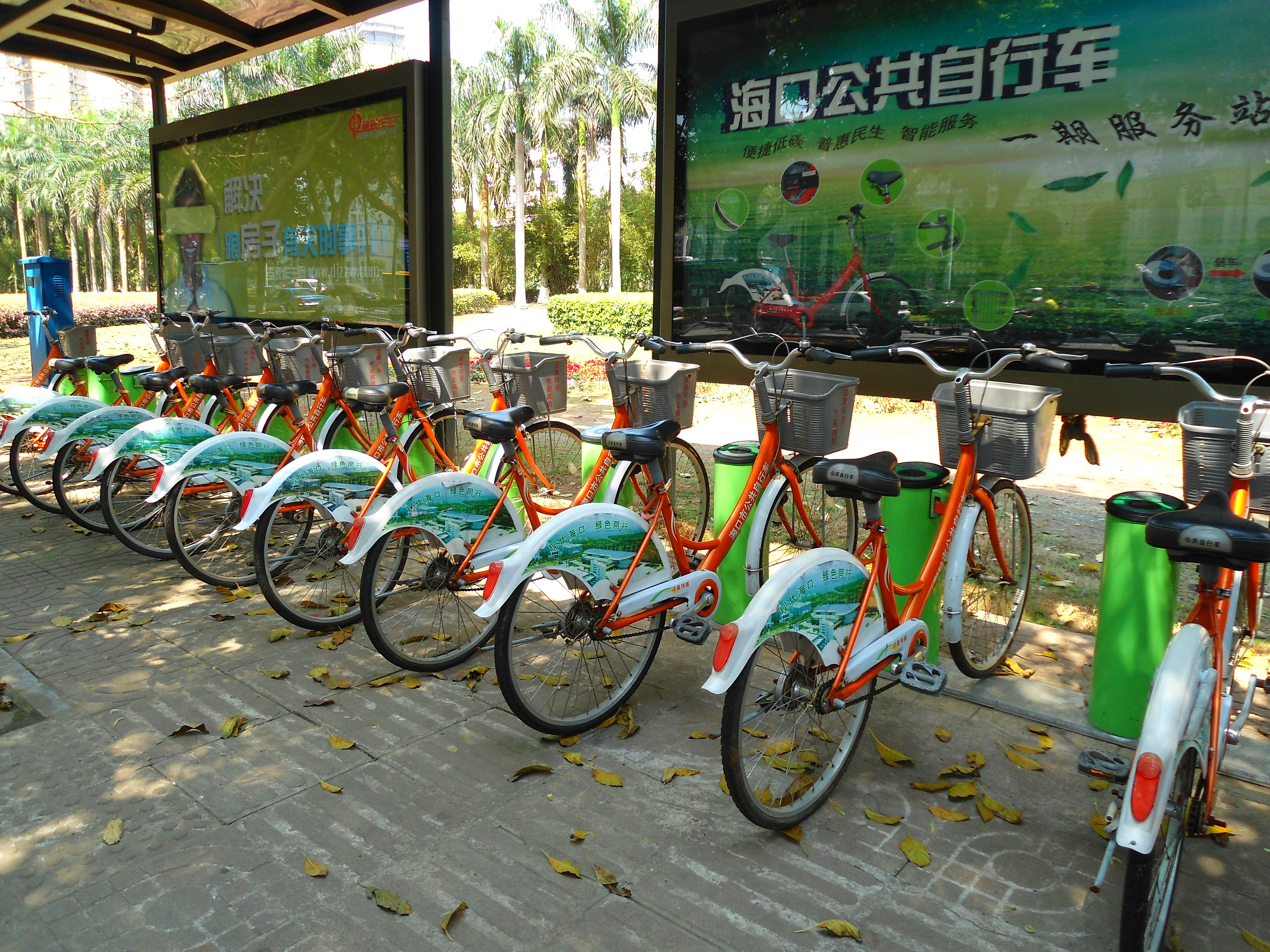
A Haikou Public Bicycle System station.

The Haikou Public Bicycle System has about 20,000 bicycles. A pre-paid swipe card system is used to gain access to them. Starting on January 24, 2017, privately run app-based "dockless" shared bikes came into service. By April, there were about 40,000 of these types of bikes available. Ofo, Mobike, and "Quick to" all cost 2 RMB per hour. Ofo and "Quick to" bikes have tires with tubes, meaning many are left around the city with flat tires. The Haikou Public Bicycle System has installed a number of new, more modern bikes with tires that cannot be punctured. Part of Mobike's fleet also uses these types of tires.

=== Air ===
Haikou is served by Haikou Meilan International Airport (IATA: HAK, ICAO: ZJHK[1]), which is located 25 km (16 mi) from the city.

In January 2011, Haikou was selected to be the first test site for an experiment allowing private helicopter flight in China.

=== Rail ===
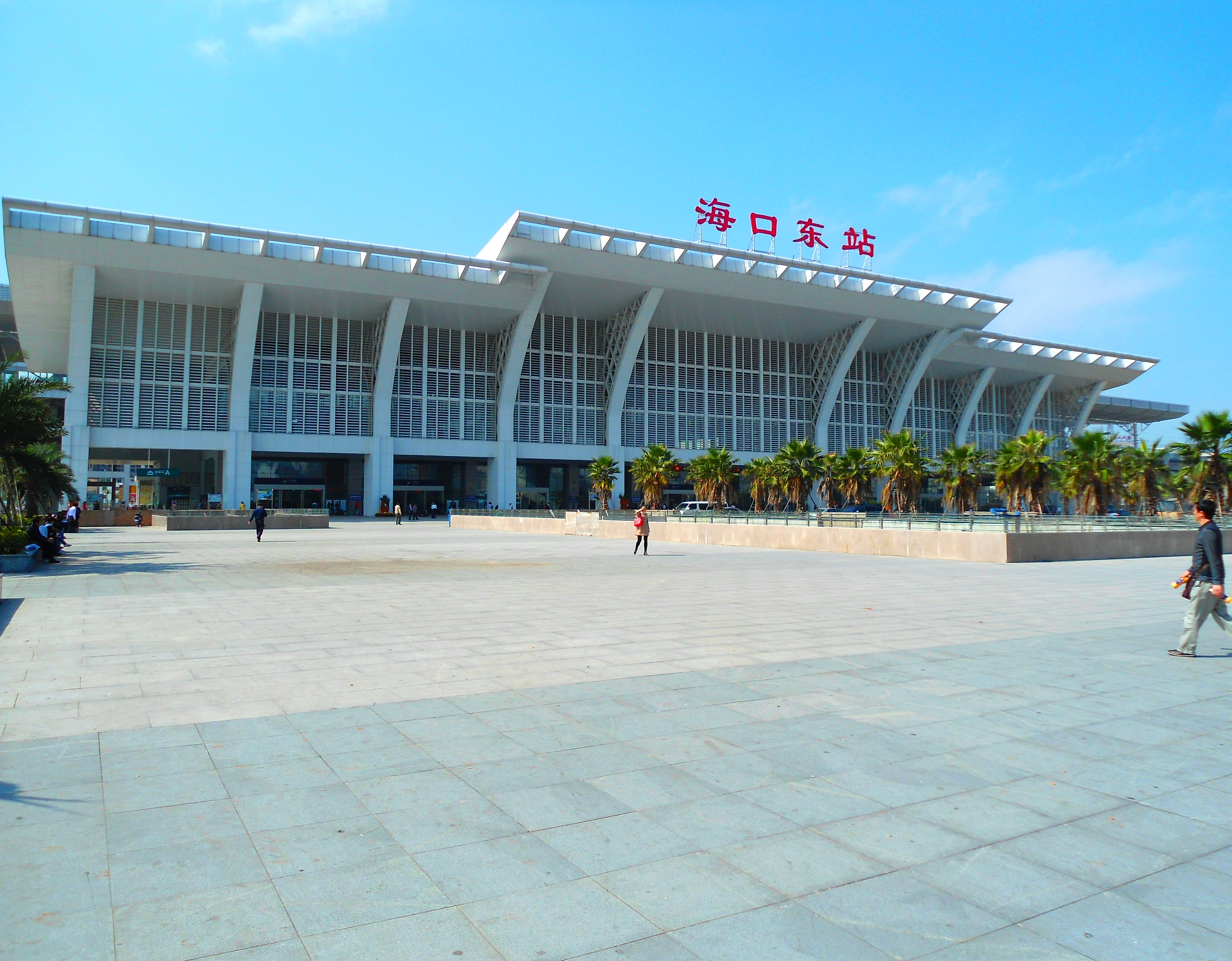
Haikou East railway station

A railway links Haikou to the mainland. A ferry service transports the railway cars, along with other motor vehicles across the strait.

The Hainan East Ring Railway links Haikou and Sanya. There are 15 stations in between, either in operation or still under construction. Trains are designed to travel at 250 km/h (155 mph). Travel time from Haikou to Sanya is approximately 1 hour and 22 minutes. The main station in Haikou is Haikou East railway station located near the southern end of Long Quan Road. In 2018, the Haikou South Station, the main bus station, relocated and is now directly to the south east of the Haikou East Railway Station.

In 2015, the Hainan western ring high-speed railway started operation. This second high-speed railway runs along the west coast of Hainan connecting with the Hainan Eastern Ring Railway.

Starting July 1, 2019, the Haikou Suburban Trains began operation. Up to 7 CRH6F-A (CRH6F with only 4 carriages) trains with specially designed liveries will operate between Haikou station and Meilan station. The longest distance it will travel one-way is around 38 kilometers with 4 stations in between.

=== Road ===
Three main highways connect Haikou to other parts of Hainan, running east, west, and south through the middle of the province. The Haiwen expressway connects the city with Wenchang to the southeast. The main bus station is Haikou Transportation Center, located beside Haikou East railway station.

=== Seaports ===
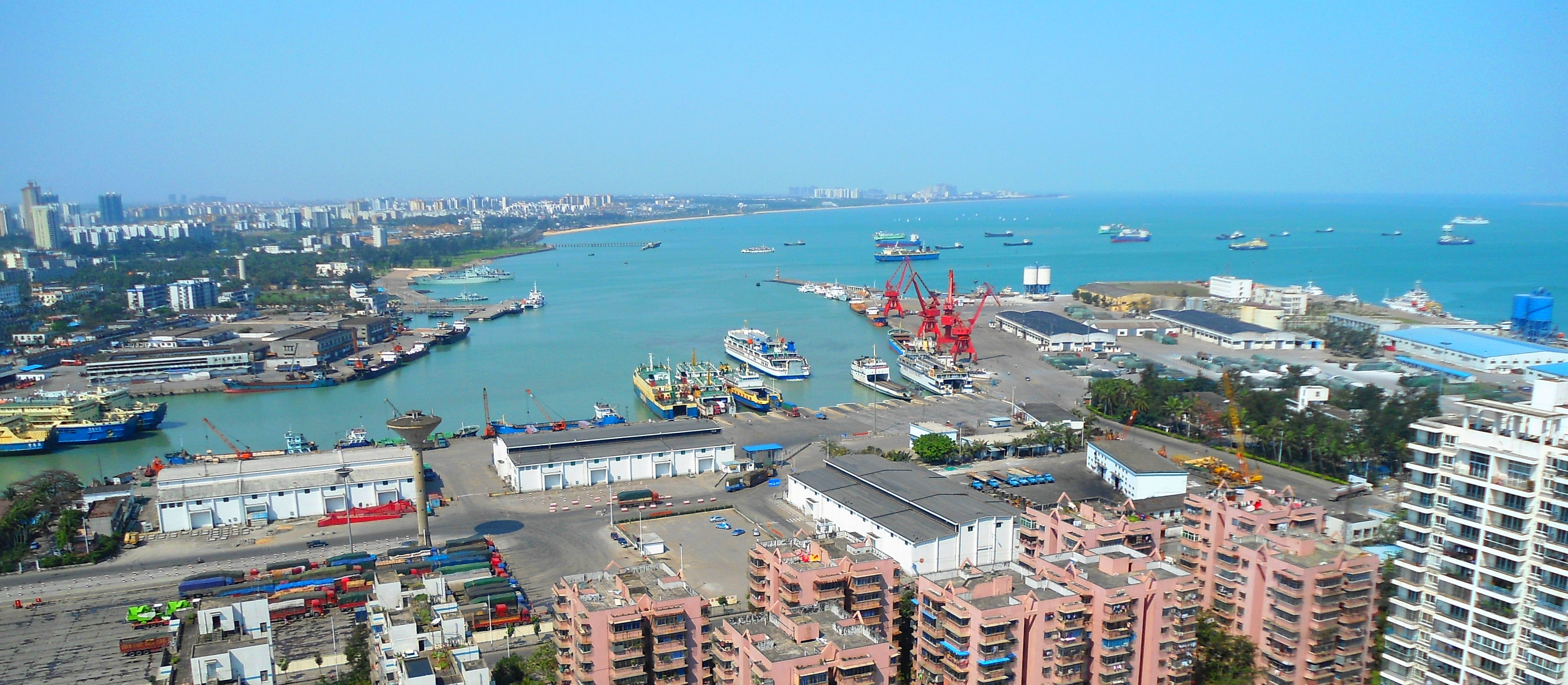
Haikou Xiuying Port

Haikou has four seaports for passenger and cargo service. Haikou New Port, formerly known as the Inner Harbour, is located on the southern side of the mouth of the Haidian River. Approximately 7 km (4 mi) west of Haikou New Port is Haikou Xiuying Port. This port is considerably larger, and is the main distribution centre for cargo entering Hainan. It is also a major port for immigration onto Hainan Island. Around 20 km (12 mi) west of downtown Haikou are South Port and Haikou Port New Seaport.

== Arts and culture ==
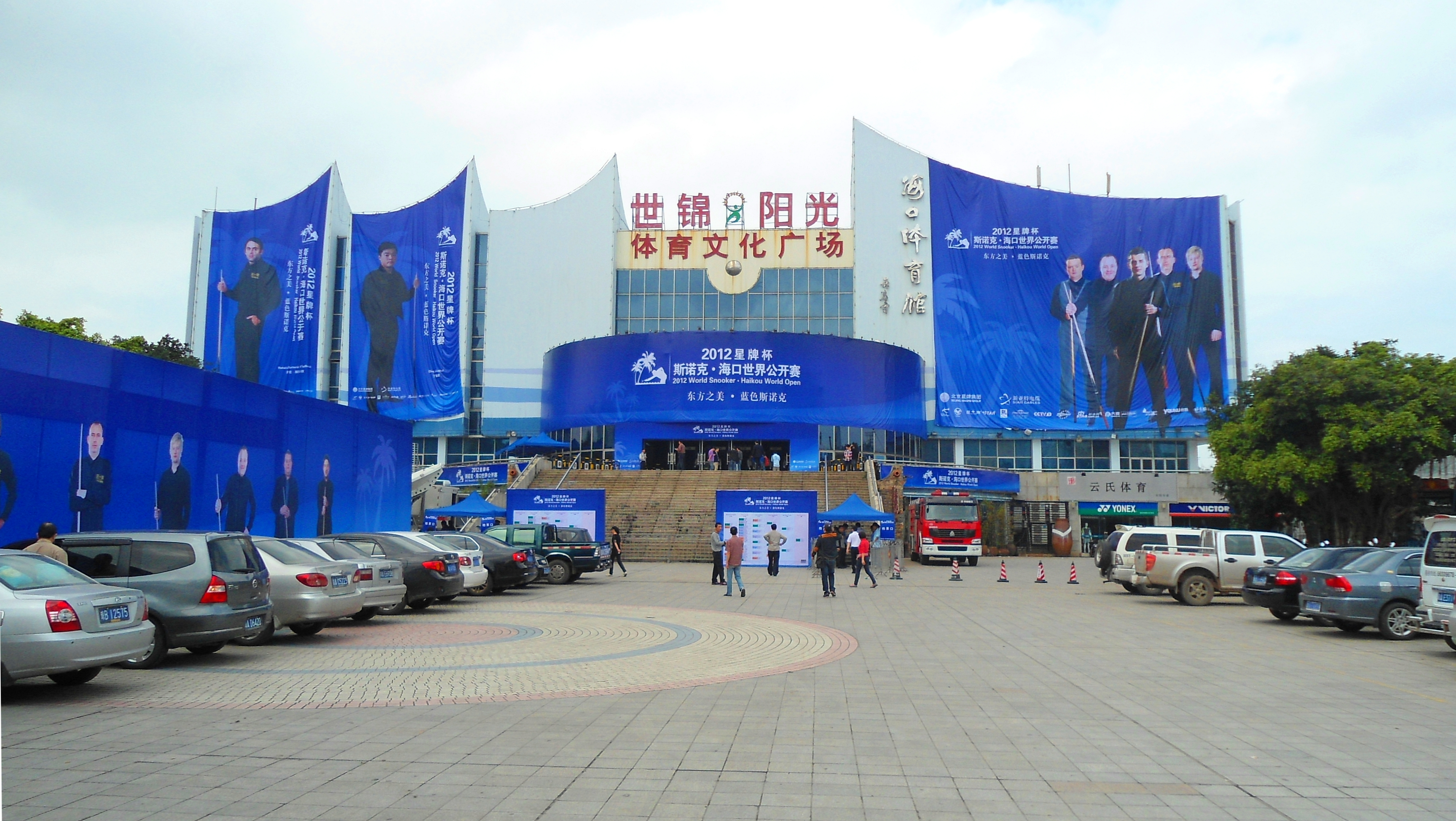
Haikou City Stadium

Several large public buildings now occupy Guoxing Avenue, the new area for arts and culture. These include the Hainan Provincial Museum, the Hainan Provincial Library, and the Hainan Centre for the Performing Arts. These are all located near to one another on the south side of the road, west of Haikou College of Economics, Haikou campus.

At the west side of Evergreen Park is the Haikou Great Hall of the People, a concert hall, and Hainan Exhibition & Convention Center, a large centre for trade shows and other commercial events. Haikou City Stadium, is the main venue for sports events, and is located at the southeast corner of Evergreen Park.

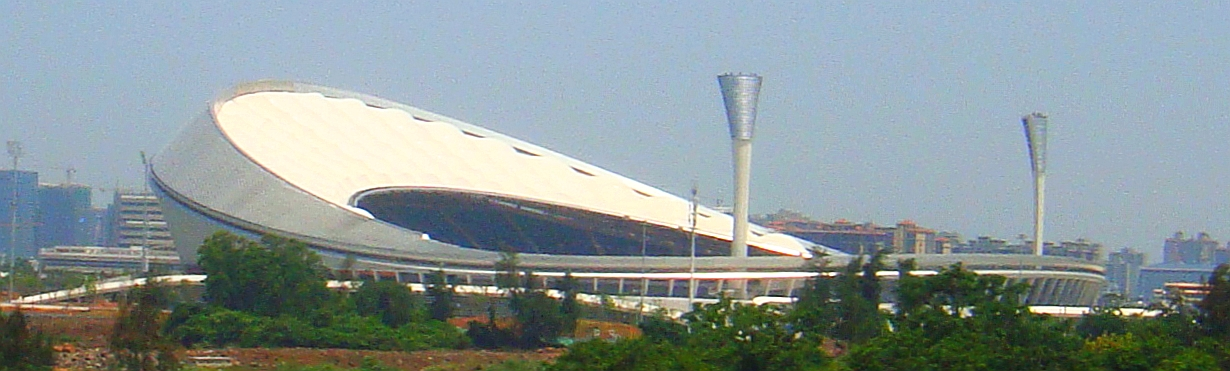
Wuyuan River Stadium

The Wuyuan River Stadium opened in April 2018. It is located west of downtown Haikou, near the newly built Haikou West Coast. With a capacity of over 40,000, it is the largest stadium in the province.

Older cultural sites include the now-restored buildings of the Bo'ai Road area, the tomb of Hai Rui, Xiuying Fort in the Guomao area, the Temple of the Five Lords, the cemetery for the martyrs of Hainan's Battle of the Liberation, and the former temple Haikou Yazhou Gu Cheng.

=== Nightlife ===
Bars and KTV are patronized until after midnight. There are several popular bar streets within the city. Up until 2015, roadside BBQ sites were common throughout the city. A large-scale campaign to clean up the city has since prohibited them.

== Tourism ==
Also known as the "Coconut city", Haikou is an important tourist destination for China. The city received 4.11 million tourists in 2002, up 7.99 percent from 2001. In 2019, the number of tourists in Haikou has exceeded 83.11 million. The city earned approximately three billion yuan (361 million US dollars) from the tourism industry during that period, up 11 percent from the previous year.

Haikou is also developing its Meetings, Incentives, Conferencing, Exhibitions industry. The local government set up the Haikou Convention and Exhibition Bureau in June 2012 and pledged RMB35 million (US$5.6 million) to support the development of the MICE industry. More international hotel chains are also arriving.

In 2016, the China Merchants holdings group unveiled its plans to develop Shenzhen, Haikou and Sanya as the three destination ports that its South China Sea passenger cruises would serve. Subsequently, a large passenger cruise terminal was inaugurated in Shenzhen in October 2016.

== Sister cities ==
Haikou has international relationships with these places:

Cities	Country	Date of Establishing Sisterhood Relationship
(Australia) Darwin	Australia	September 5, 1990
(Egypt) Faiyum	Egypt	
(United Kingdom) Perth	United Kingdom	February 3, 1992
(France) Saint Nazaire	France	June 27, 1992
(United States) Oklahoma City	United States	November 20, 1992
(Tanzania) Zanzibar City	Tanzania	October 30, 1997
(Poland) Gdynia	Poland	April 24, 2006
(Seychelles) Victoria	Seychelles	July 25, 2007
(Myanmar) Yangon	Myanmar	June 16, 2017
(Indonesia) North Lombok Regency	Indonesia	
(United States) Scottsdale	United States	
(Hungary) Zugló	Hungary	Sept 10

== Gallery ==
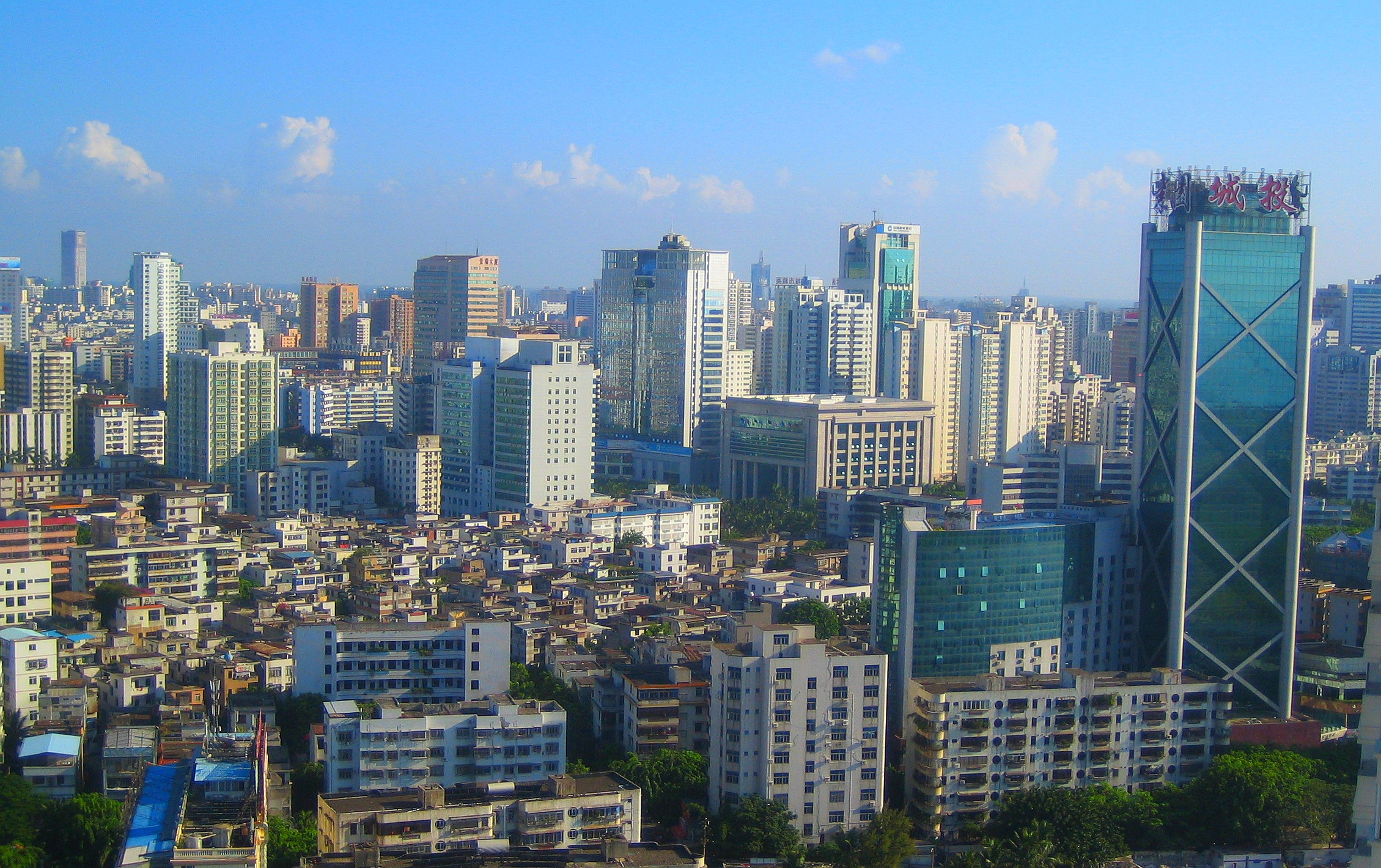
A view south from Binhai road

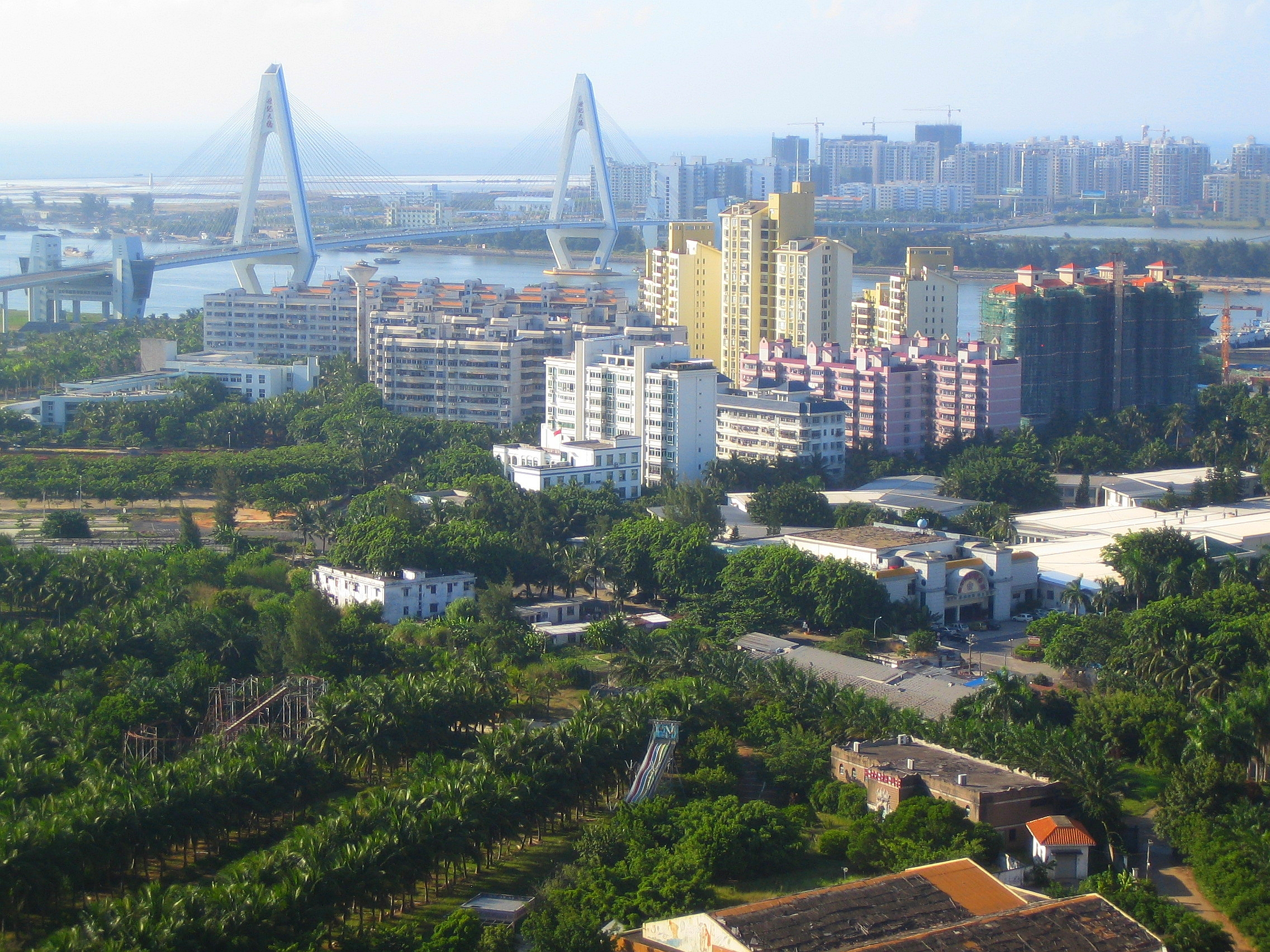
Haikou Century Bridge

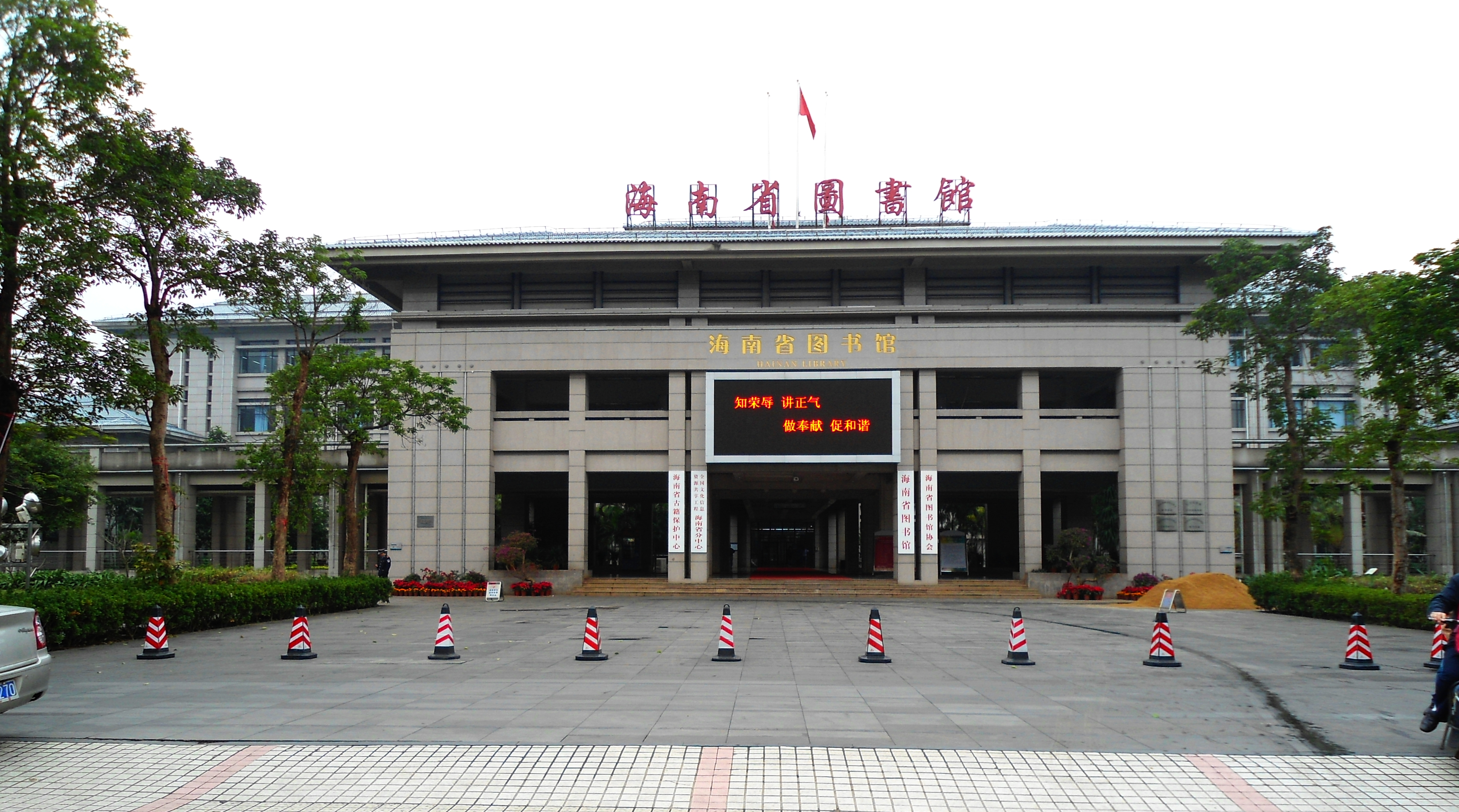
Hainan Provincial Library

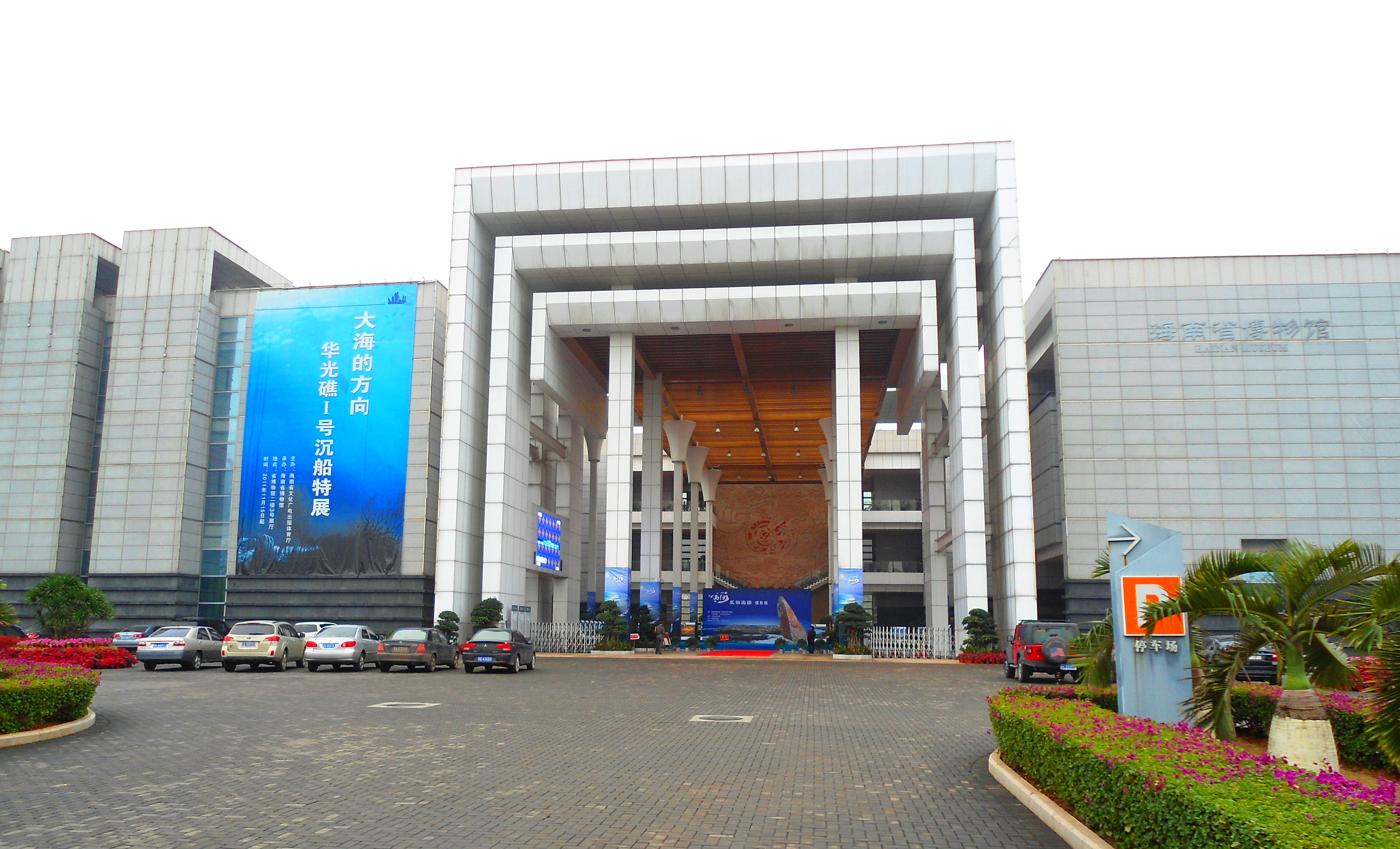
Hainan Museum

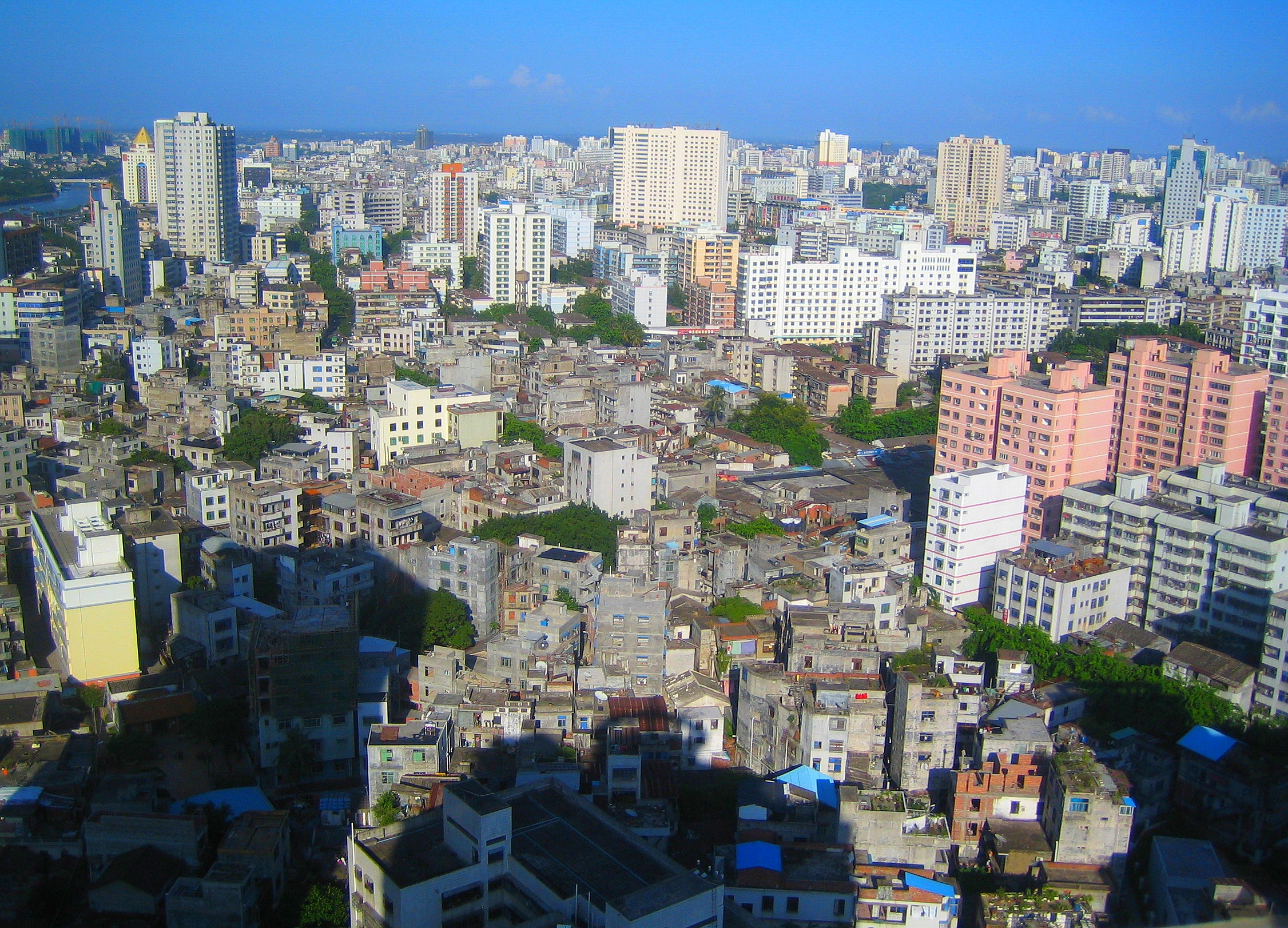
A view east from Evergreen Park area

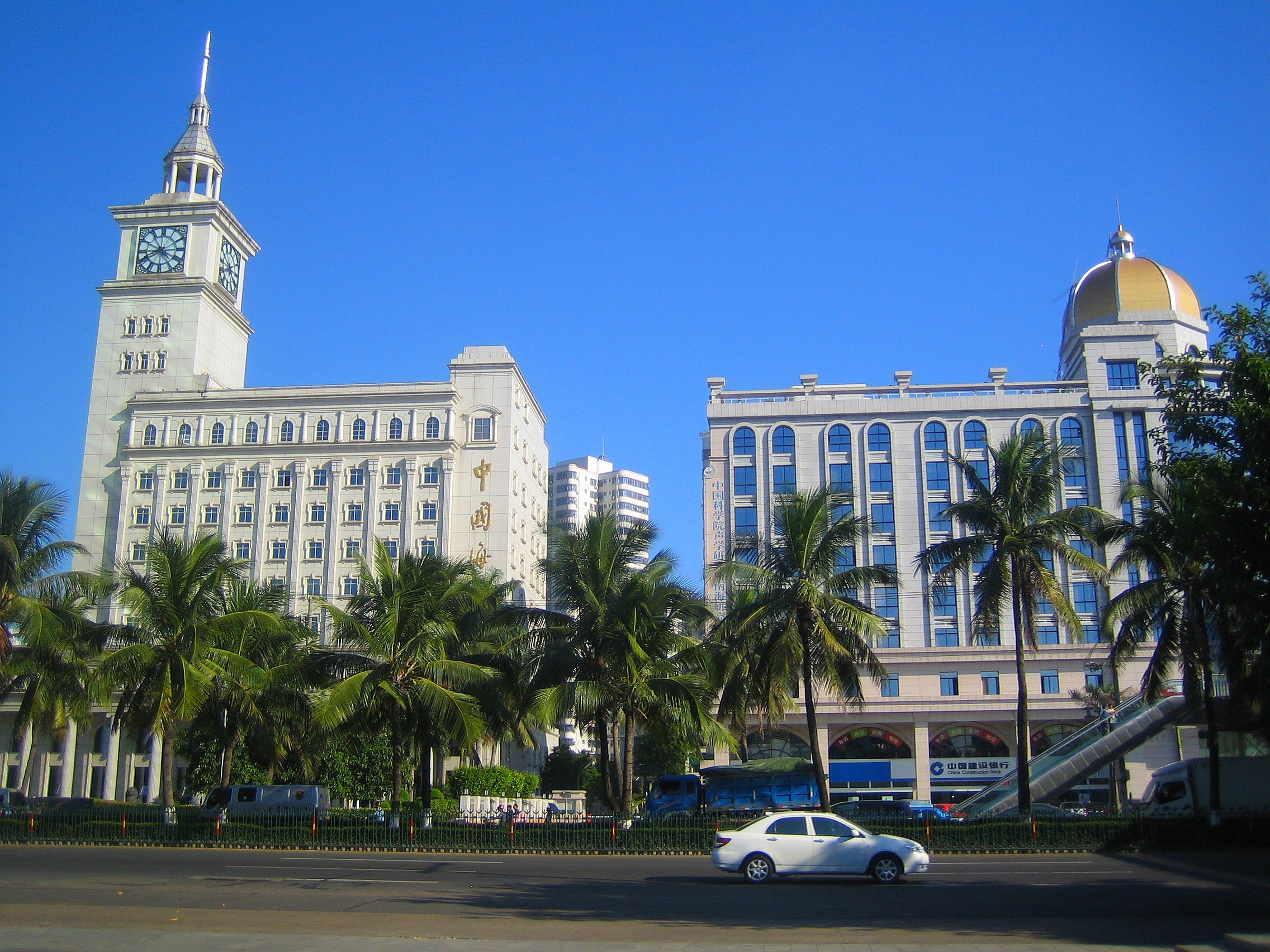
The customs building

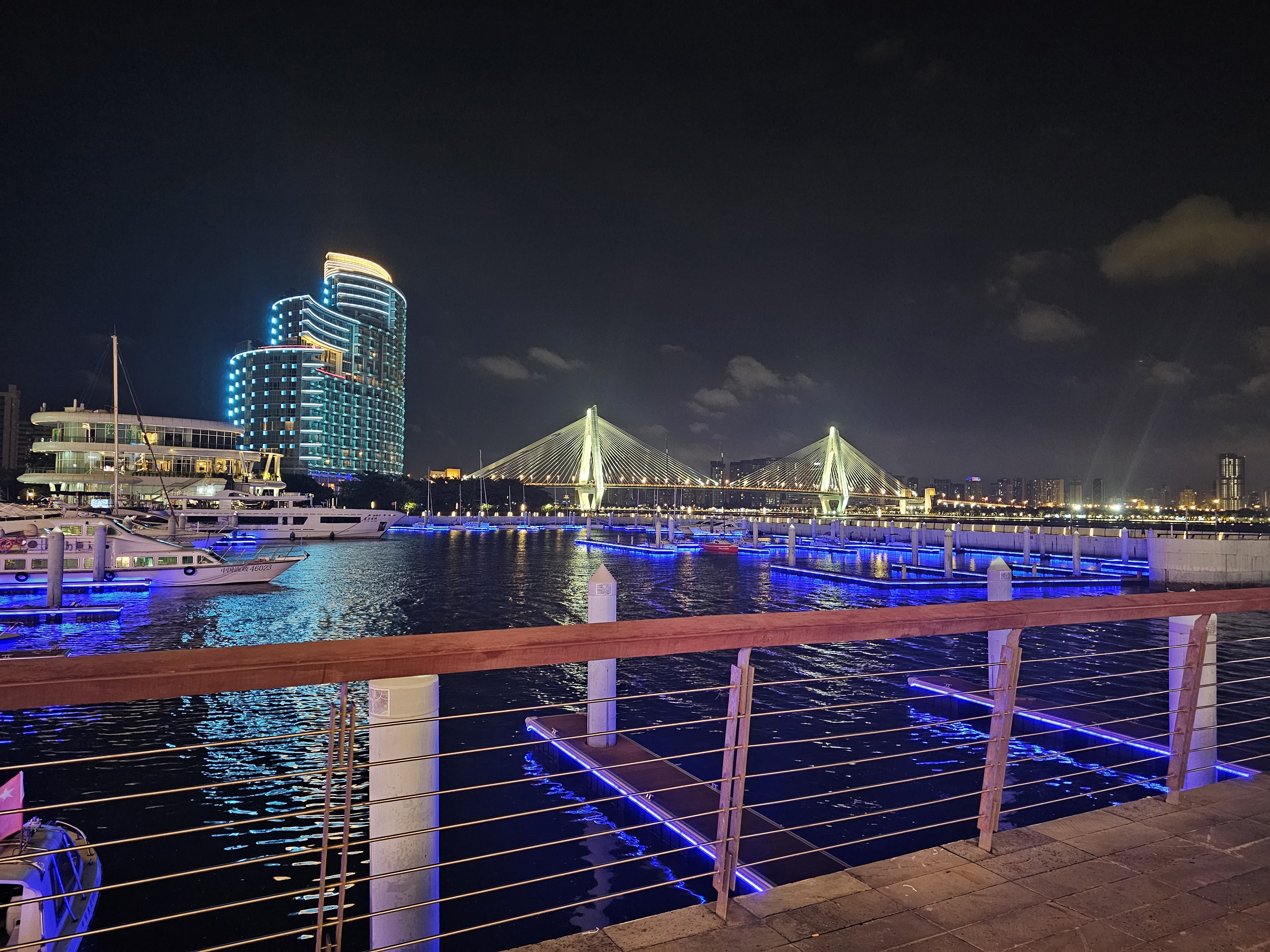
A view of Century Bridge from Haidian Island at Night

== See also ==
- List of twin towns and sister cities in China
