= Changying Global 100 Fantasy Park =

Amusement park in Haikou, China

Changying Global 100 Fantasty Park
- Interactive map of Changying Global 100 Fantasty Park
- Location: Haikou, Hainan, China
- Coordinates: 19.9808°N 110.1947°E

Changying Global 100 Fantasty Park (Chinese: 长影环球100奇幻乐园), also known as Changying Wonderland, is an amusement park in Haikou, Hainan, China. It is located around 12 km west of downtown Haikou, and around 7 km south of Haikou's west coast area. It was developed by Changying group.

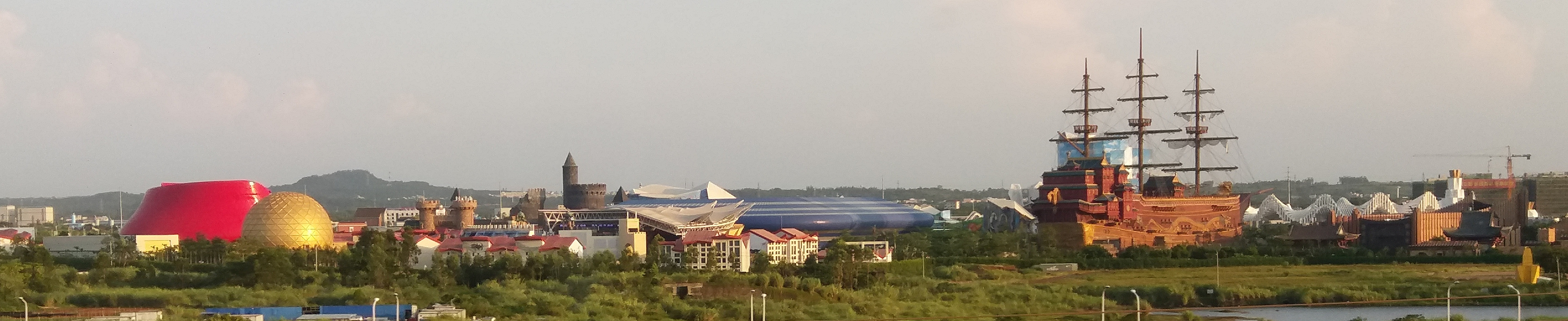
The park in 2019
