= Hongcheng Lake =

- 红城湖 (Chinese)
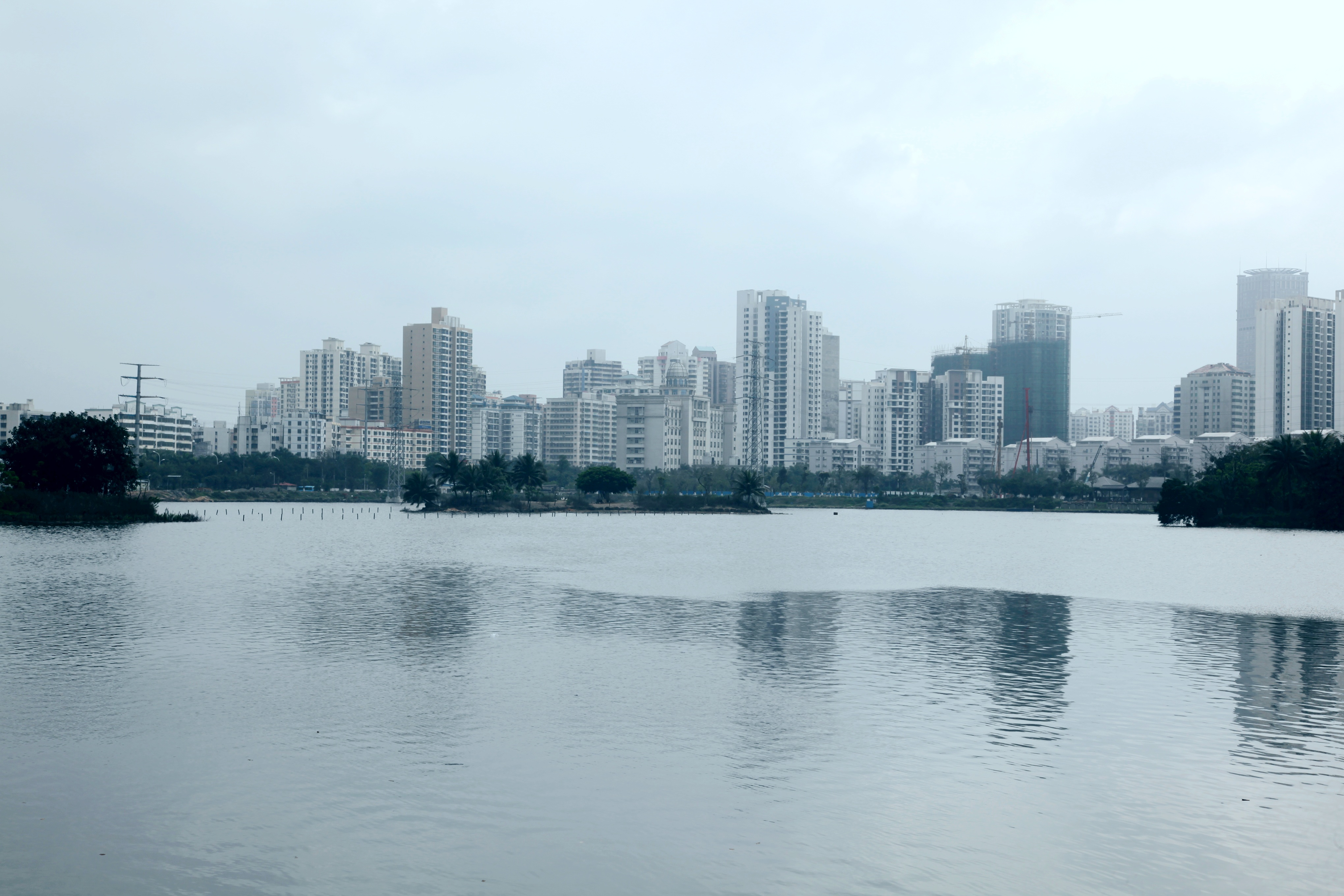
- Hongcheng Lake in 2014 before the renovation

- Location within Hainan
- Location: Haikou, Hainan, China
- Coordinates: 20.00634°N 110.3477°E
- Type: Urban lake
- Primary outflows: Haikou Bay
- Max. length: 0.7 kilometres (0.43 mi)
- Max. width: 0.5 kilometres (0.31 mi)

Hongcheng Lake (Chinese: 红城湖) is a lake in Haikou, Hainan, China. It was renovated around 2017 to 2018. It has three islands. Two small, and one, at the west side, is larger with short bridge access and an old, dilapidated building on it.
