= Bo'ai Road area =

Neighbourhood in Haikou, China

Coordinates: 20.044337°N 110.339264°E

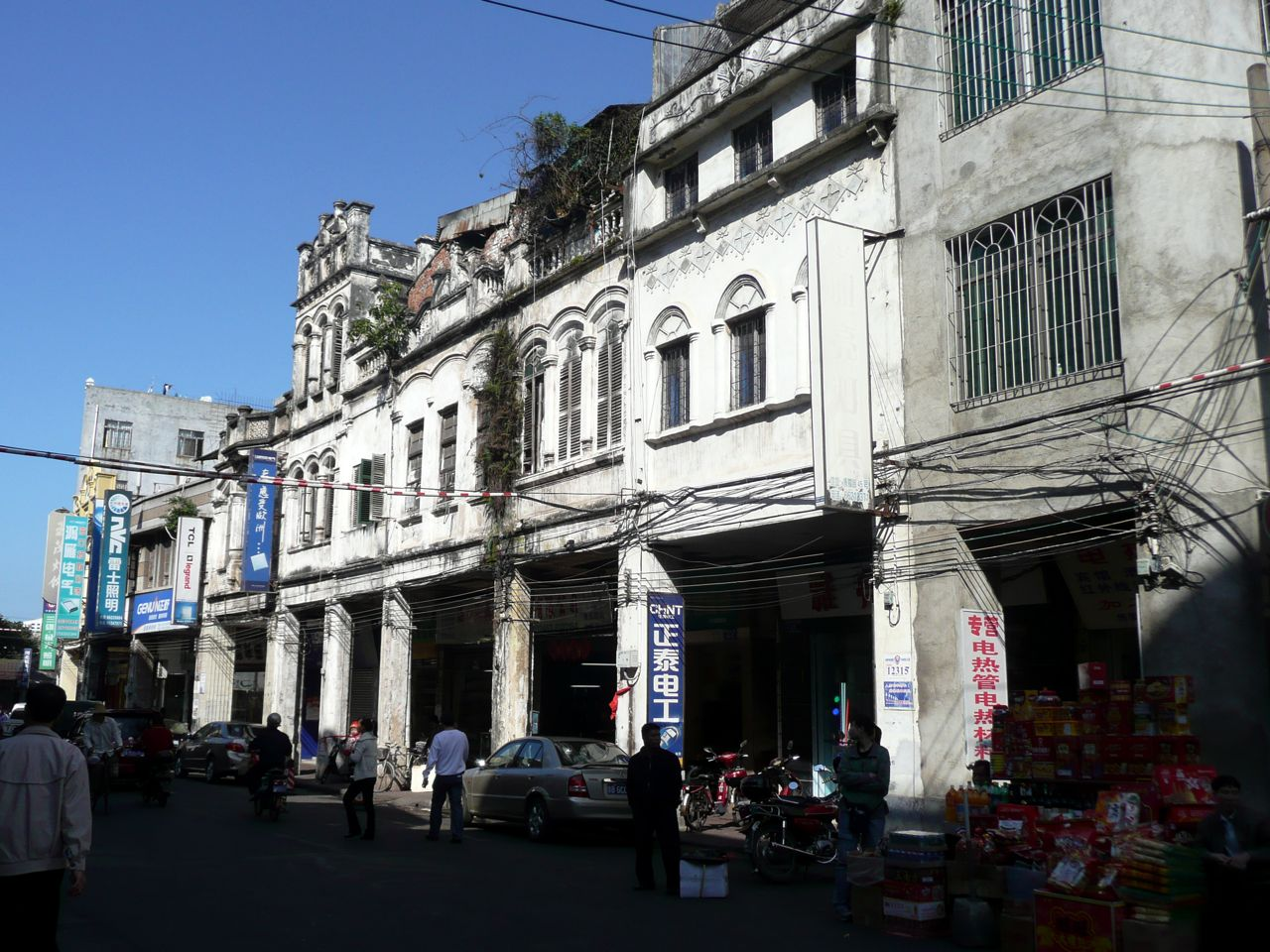

The Bo'ai Road area (Chinese: 博爱路小区; pinyin: Bó'ài Lù xiǎoqū) is a historical neighbourhood in Haikou City, Hainan, China. It is located on the south side of the Haidian River, at the northern part of mainland Haikou. The main hub of the neighbourhood is the north-south Bo'ai Road itself, a commercial road with shops selling such items as fabrics, wholesale toys, and pets, in particular freshwater fish.

Much of the area comprises tong lau-style, buildings with European fusion-type architectural facades with Indian and Arabic influences. The buildings are almost all painted white, and are usually no more than a few storeys tall. Many were dilapidated. However, much of the area has now been restored. The streets are mostly narrow with many winding alleyways. The area is populated almost entirely by indigenous Hainan people.

Several roads running east and west from Bo'ai Road, and adjacent parallel streets specialize in certain goods. The eastern part of the neighbourhood is mostly residential.

== Hubs ==
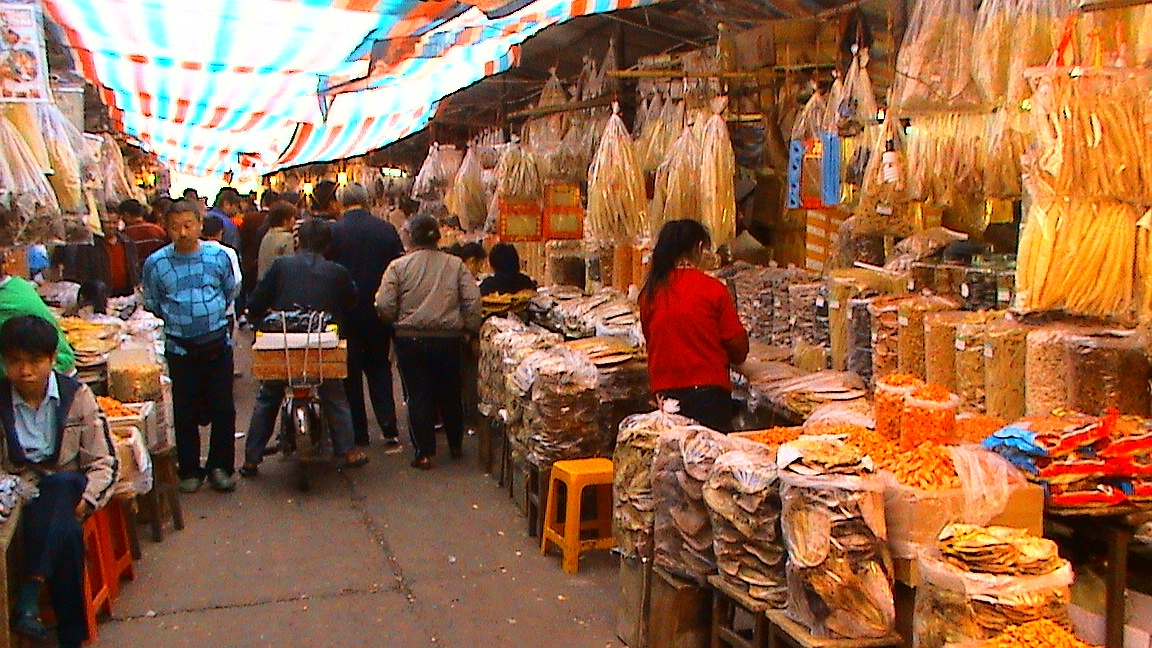
This narrow road sells specialty foods such as exotic meats

Since around 2010, a small number of the buildings have been demolished, either for development, or because they were unsafe. Beginning around 2012, parts of the area have been restored, with the building facades overhauled and road surfaces in severe disrepair being replaced with cobblestones. As of June 2015, the entire west side of the areas has had new cobblestone roads installed. A number of the buildings on the northern boundary on Binhai Road have been demolished and replaced with buildings in the original style.

A narrow, covered road running east from Bo'ai Road is well known for specialty foods including spices, dried seafoods, and exotic meats. The same street, running east from Bo'ai Road specializes in replica antiques with dozens of roadside vendors.

Haikou's main fabric wholesale and retail area is centered on Bo'ai Road.

Most of the northernmost part has hundreds of shops selling hardware, lighting, drapes, and shoes. Most of the southern area sells shoes, with the southern end of Bo'ai Road having a number of wholesale toy shops.

=== Zhongshan Road ===
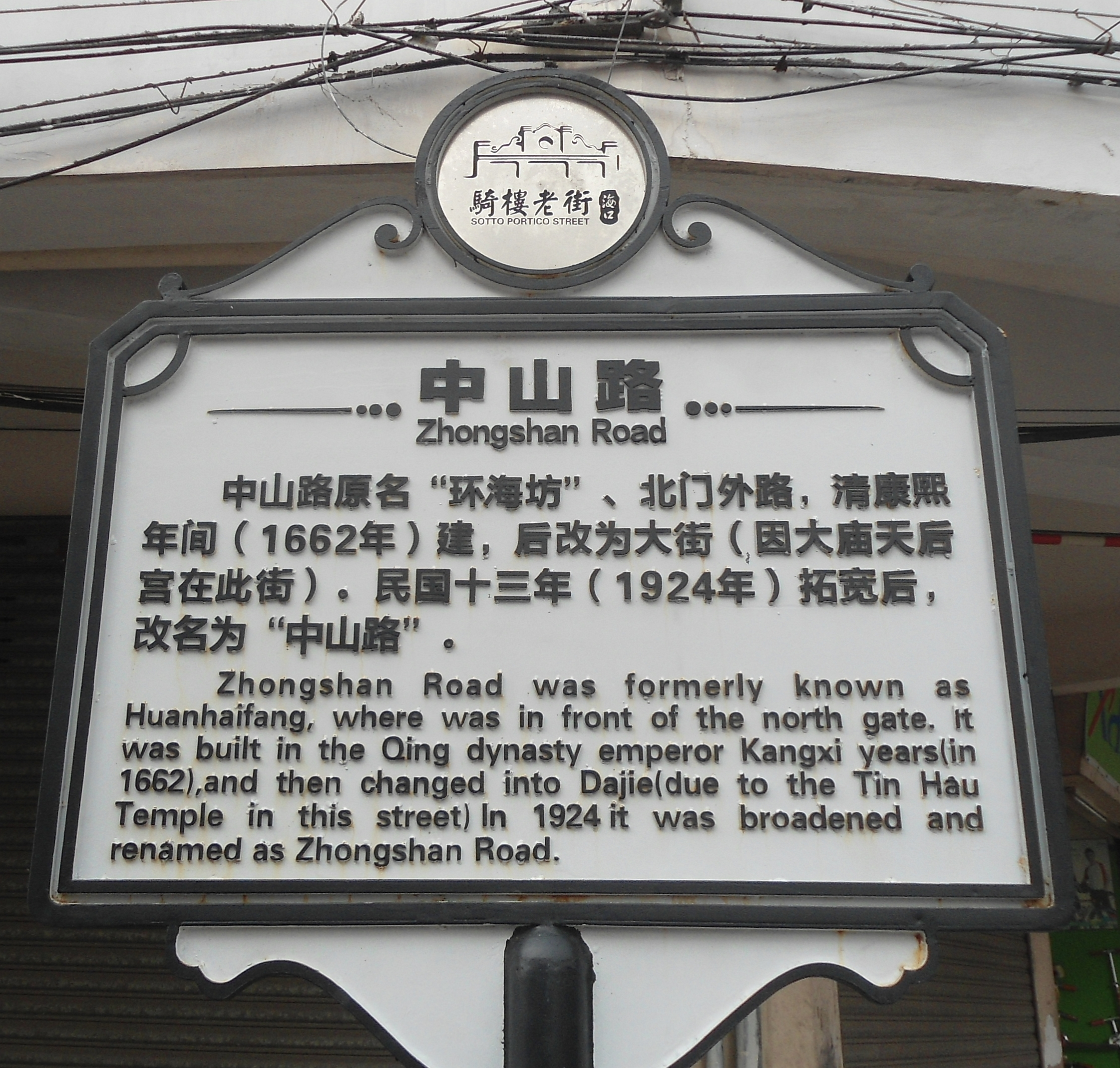

Also known as the Qilou Arcade Streets and Qilou Old Street, and formerly known as Huanhaifang Road, a government project to restore parts of this street began around 2012. Restoration of all 39 buildings on Zhongshan Road was completed in early 2013. The road was entirely repaved with cobblestones, large potted plants and bronze sculptures are now located at the roadside. The entire strip has become a pedestrian zone, with physical barriers at each end to prevent all motorized traffic from entering, including two-wheeled electric vehicles.

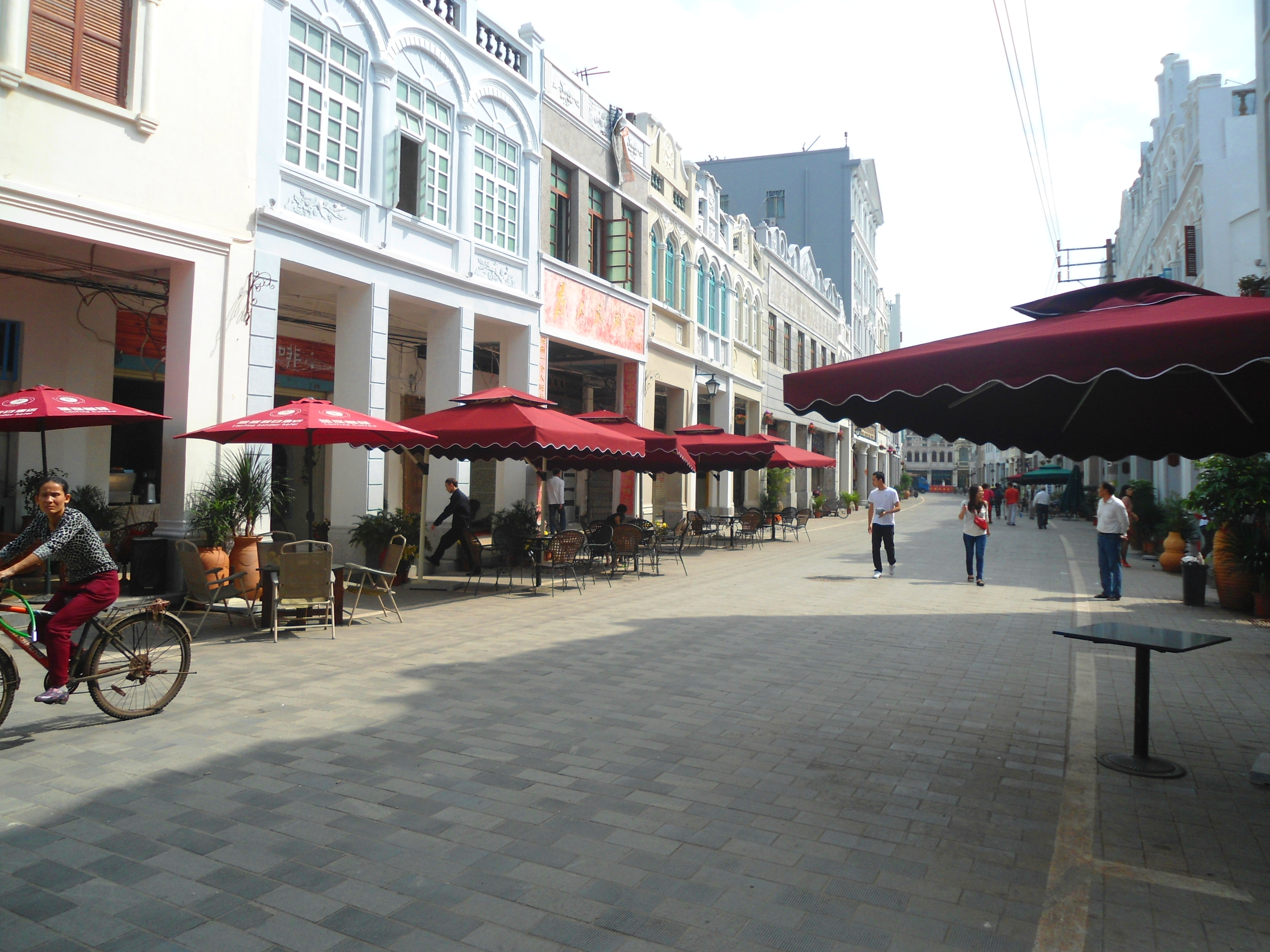
Zhongshan Road after restoration

As of June 2015, most of the old shops, many of which were hardware stores, have been replaced with businesses to attract tourists. These include juice bars and coffee shops. Several of these businesses have set up chairs, tables and patio umbrellas on the street. These are all higher quality, made of wood and canvass and of similar style, unlike others typically found in the rest of Haikou, which are plastic and low quality. The establishment of this street is part of an effort to attract visitors to Haikou.

Similar buildings are found in Puqian's old street (unrestored), and Wennan Old Street (fully restored) in Wencheng Town.
