= Shapo =

Shapo may refer to:

- Denis Shapovalov (born 1999), nicknamed Shapo, Canadian tennis player
- Urial, or shapo, a species of Asian wild sheep
- Shapo Reservoir, Hainan, China
- Shapo, a 2011 DSiWare game
- Shapo (software), a software-as-a-service platform for collecting, managing and displaying customer text and video testimonials

== See also ==
- Chapeau (disambiguation), pronounced the same in French
