= Hunan Grand Theatre =

Performing arts center in Changsha, Hunan, China

- 湖南大剧院
- Interactive map of Hunan Grand Theatre
- Address: 139 Shaoshan North Road; Changsha, Hunan; China
- Coordinates: 28.18972°N 112.99767°E
- Capacity: 1,460

Construction
- Opened: November 1998

Website
- www.hndjy.cn

The Hunan Grand Theatre (Chinese: 湖南大剧院) is a large-scale performing arts center in Changsha, Hunan, China, opened in November 1998. It was designated a national cultural demonstration site in 2010. Its main hall has a capacity of 1,460 spectators.
