= Mother River =

Mother River may refer to:

== Rivers and waterways ==
- Danube, Central and Eastern Europe
- Daugava, Latvia
- Emajõgi, Estonia
- Fen River, Shanxi Province, China
- Mavil Aru, Sri Lanka
- Meishe River, Hainan, China
- Horikawa River, Japan
- Mother Brook, Boston, Massachusetts, United States
- Red River (Asia), Yunnan in Southwest China through northern Vietnam
- Sarasvati River, mentioned in Rig Veda and Vedic texts
- Ting River, China
- Yangtze River, China
- Yellow River, China
- Yitong River, China
