= Shapo Reservoir =

Shapo Reservoir 沙坡水库
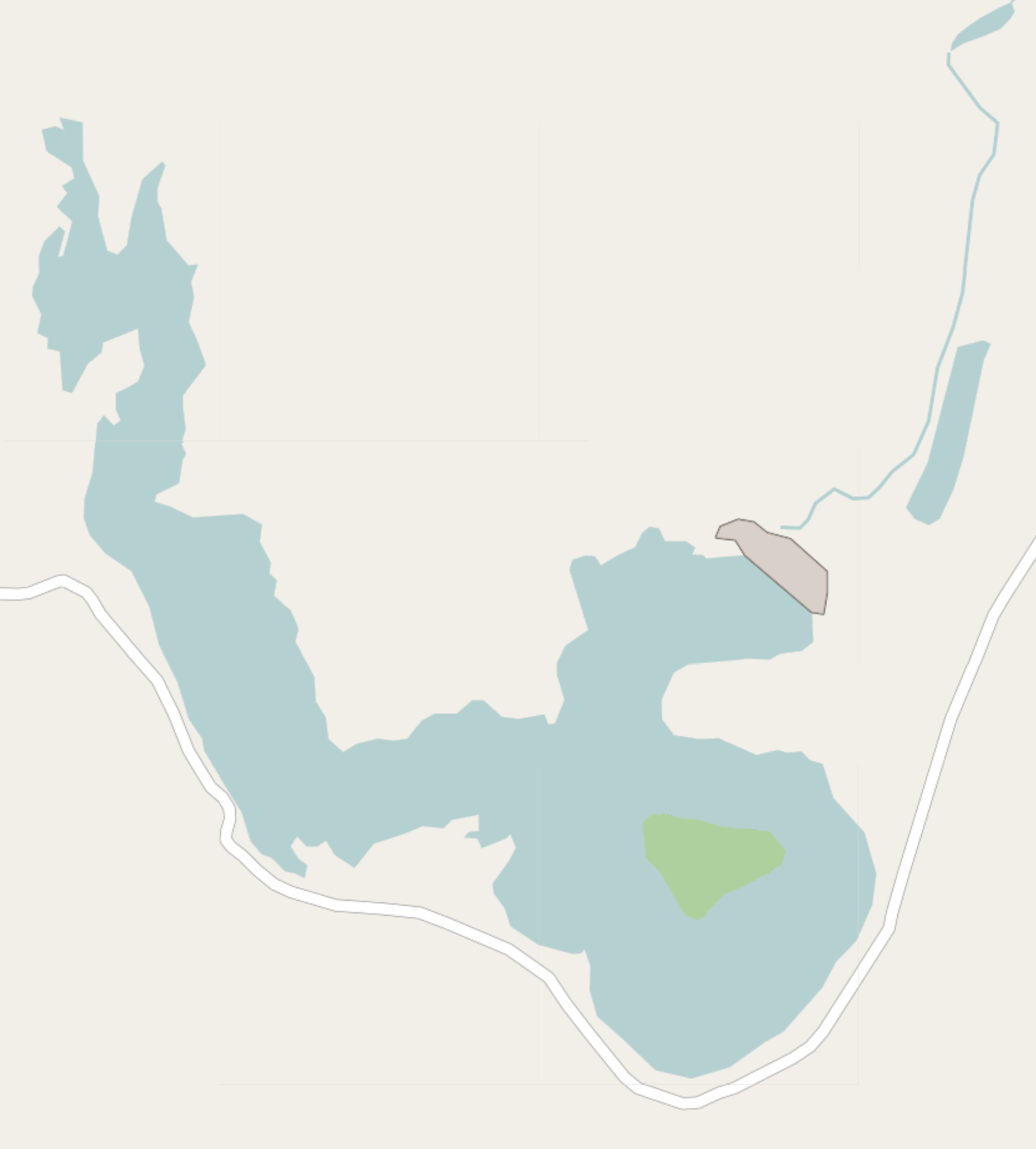
- The grey area centre right indicates the location of the dam (see photo in article)

- Location within Hainan
- Location: Haikou, Hainan
- Coordinates: 19.95442°N 110.32473°E
- Type: Reservoir
- Primary outflows: Meishe River
- Basin countries: China
- Islands: 1

The Shapo Reservoir (Chinese: 沙坡水库) is located 5 km south of Haikou city, Hainan, China, south of Shapo Village at Chengxi Town. The purpose of this reservoir is to prevent floods and conserve water to supply to Haikou. It is roughly 2 km long. A single dam is located at the northeast bank.

Water released from this dam flows into a spillway and then starts the Meishe River. This narrow river then flows eastward under Longkun Road just south of the Haikou East Railway Station. It then turns north, runs past the Meishe River National Wetland Park, and empties into the Haidian River.

== Design and construction ==
The Shapo Reservoir was designed and is administered within Longhua District's jurisdiction.

Construction of the reservoir started in 1959 and was completed in 1964. Reinforcements were made in 2013.

== Description ==
=== The reservoir ===
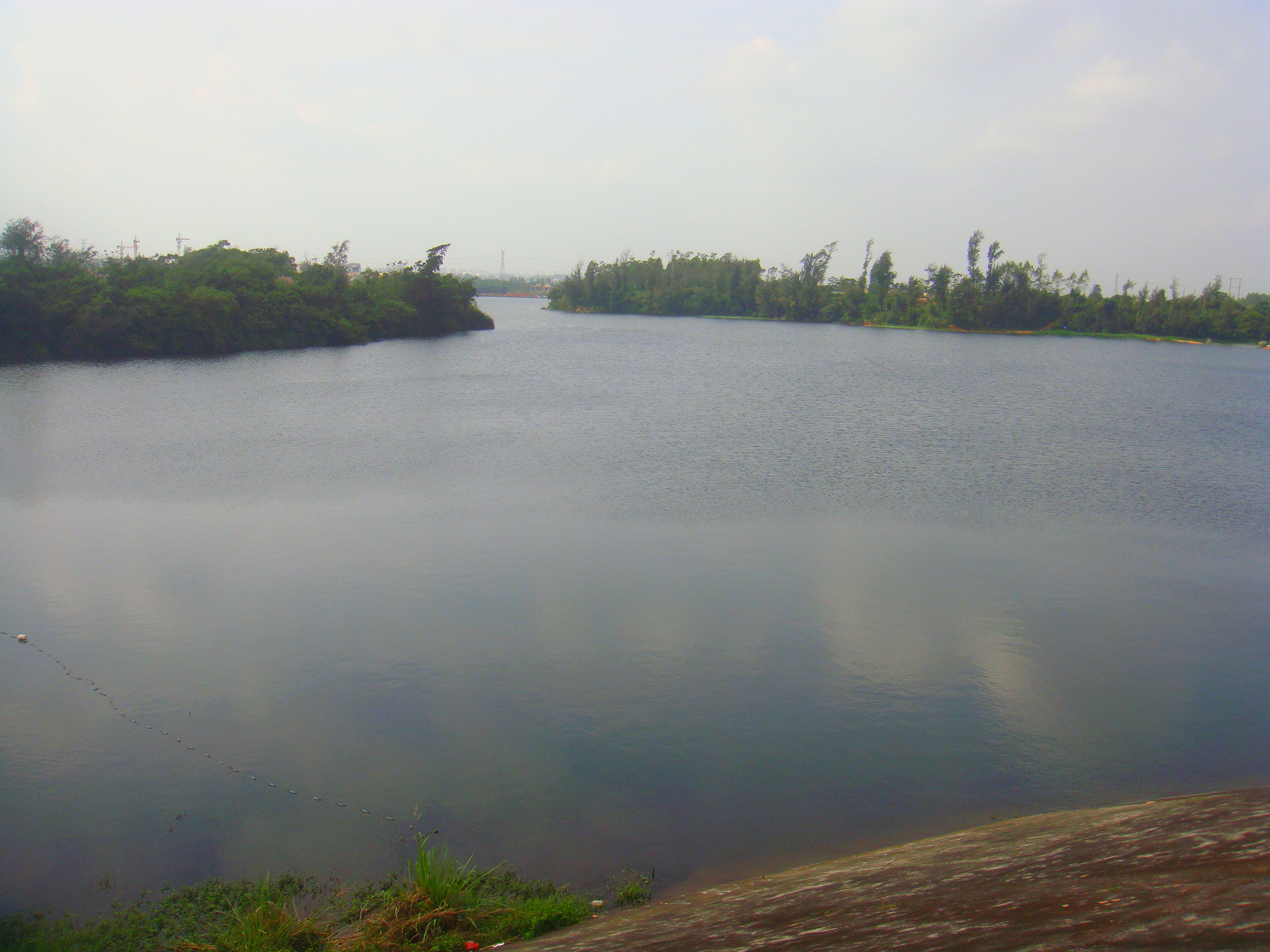
Shapo Reservoir viewed south from the south end of the dam

Shapo is a medium-size reservoir being 27.46 km^{2}. It can hold 14,190,000 cubic metres of water. The normal water level is 30 metres, and at that level, it contains 11,320,000 cubic metres of water. With the exception of the concrete dam, its banks are entirely natural and mostly tree-lined.

=== The dam ===
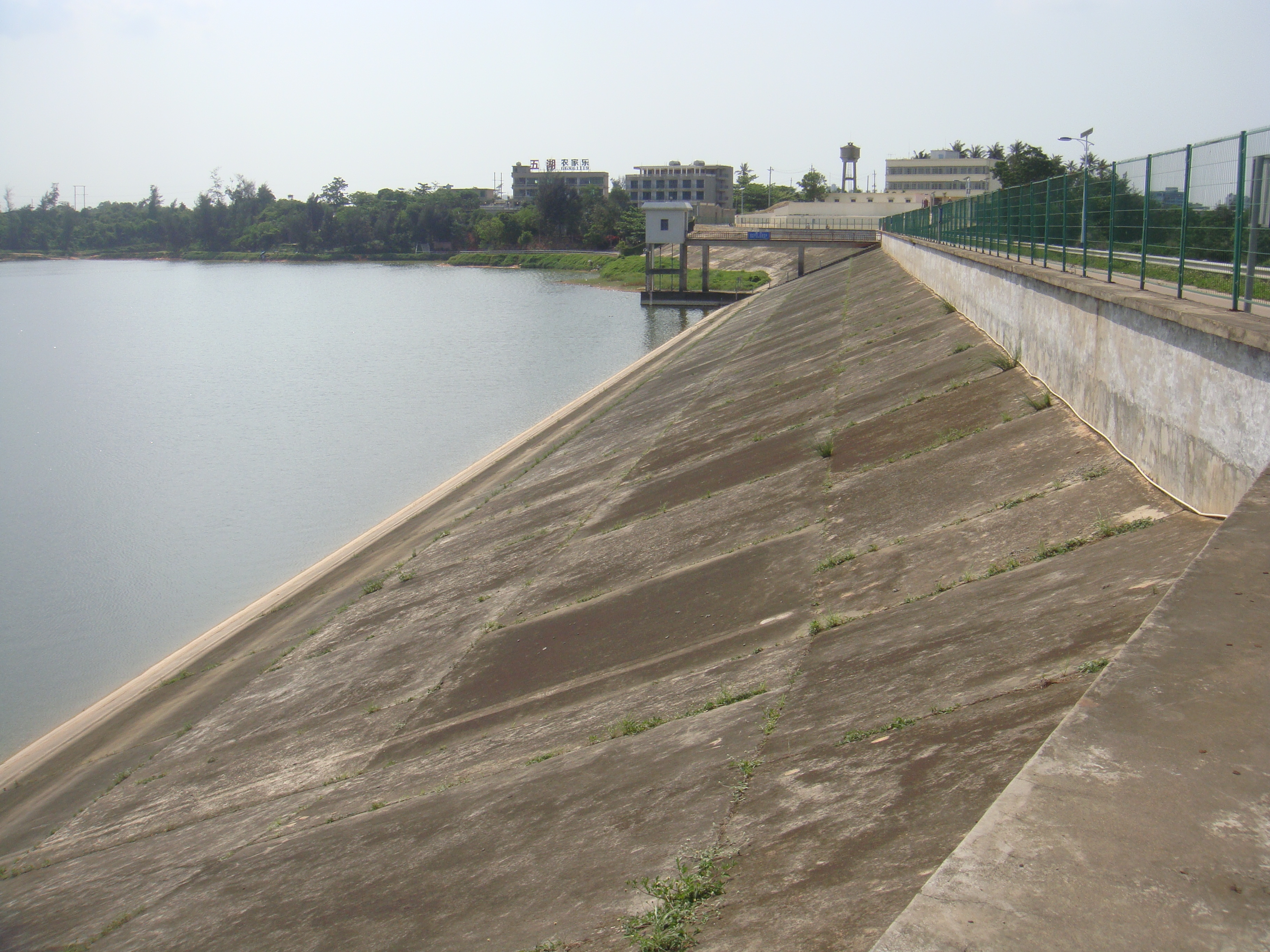
The dam at the east side of the reservoir (see map image in infobox)

On the northeast bank there is roughly 300-metre-long dam. It has two outlets, a set of three floodgates at its south end, and a small outlet at the north end. Water from the north outlet follows a narrow, concrete channel that empties into the Meishe River. Water from the main floodgates also runs into the same river after flowing down a banked spillway.

On top of the dam there is a narrow road for vehicular traffic.

== Usage ==
The primary purpose of the reservoir is for water storage and flood prevention. Fishing and boating is prohibited. However, some fishermen are able to circumvent or defeat fences and are found fishing along the banks.

== Gallery ==
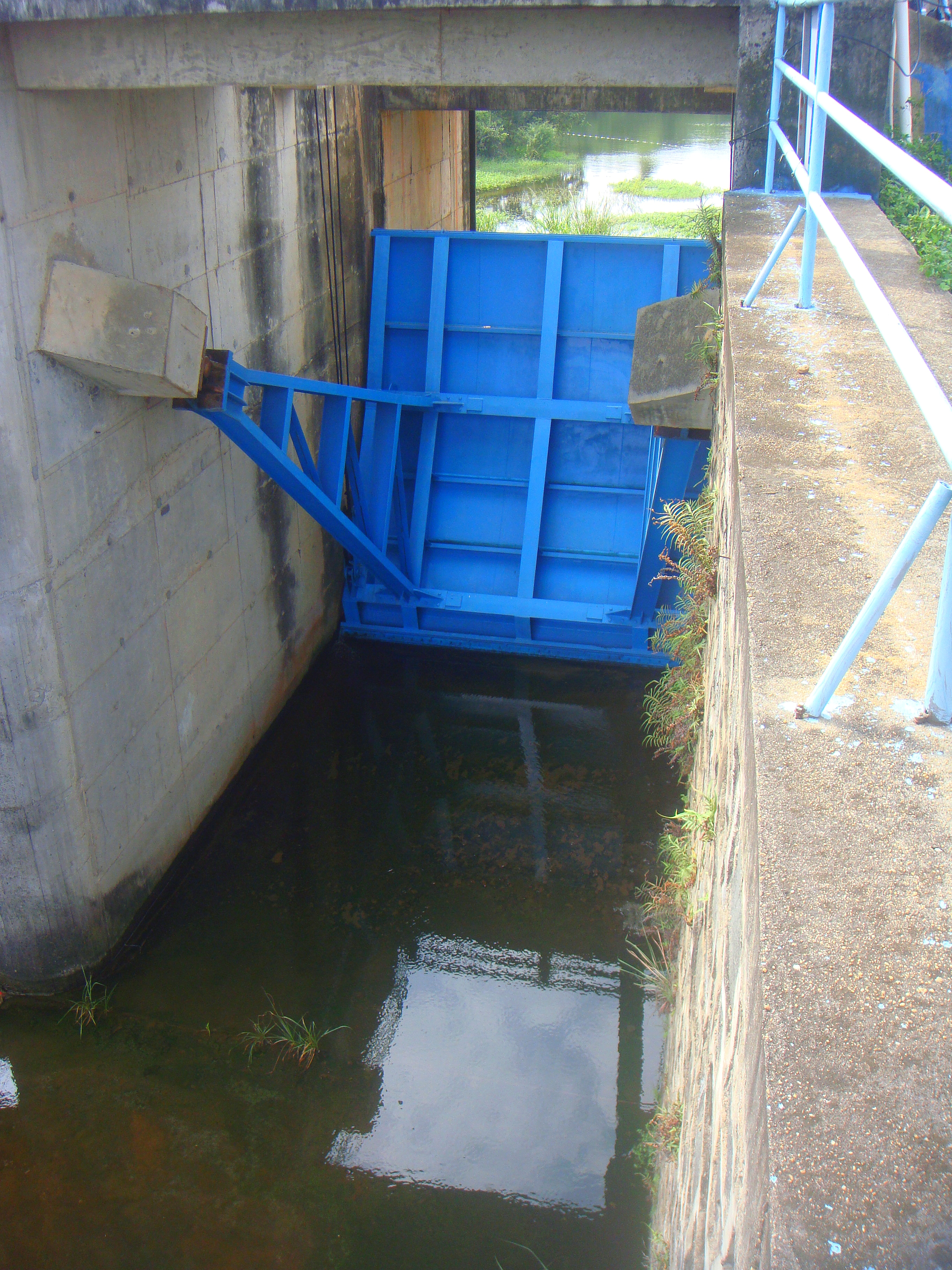
One of the three floodgates

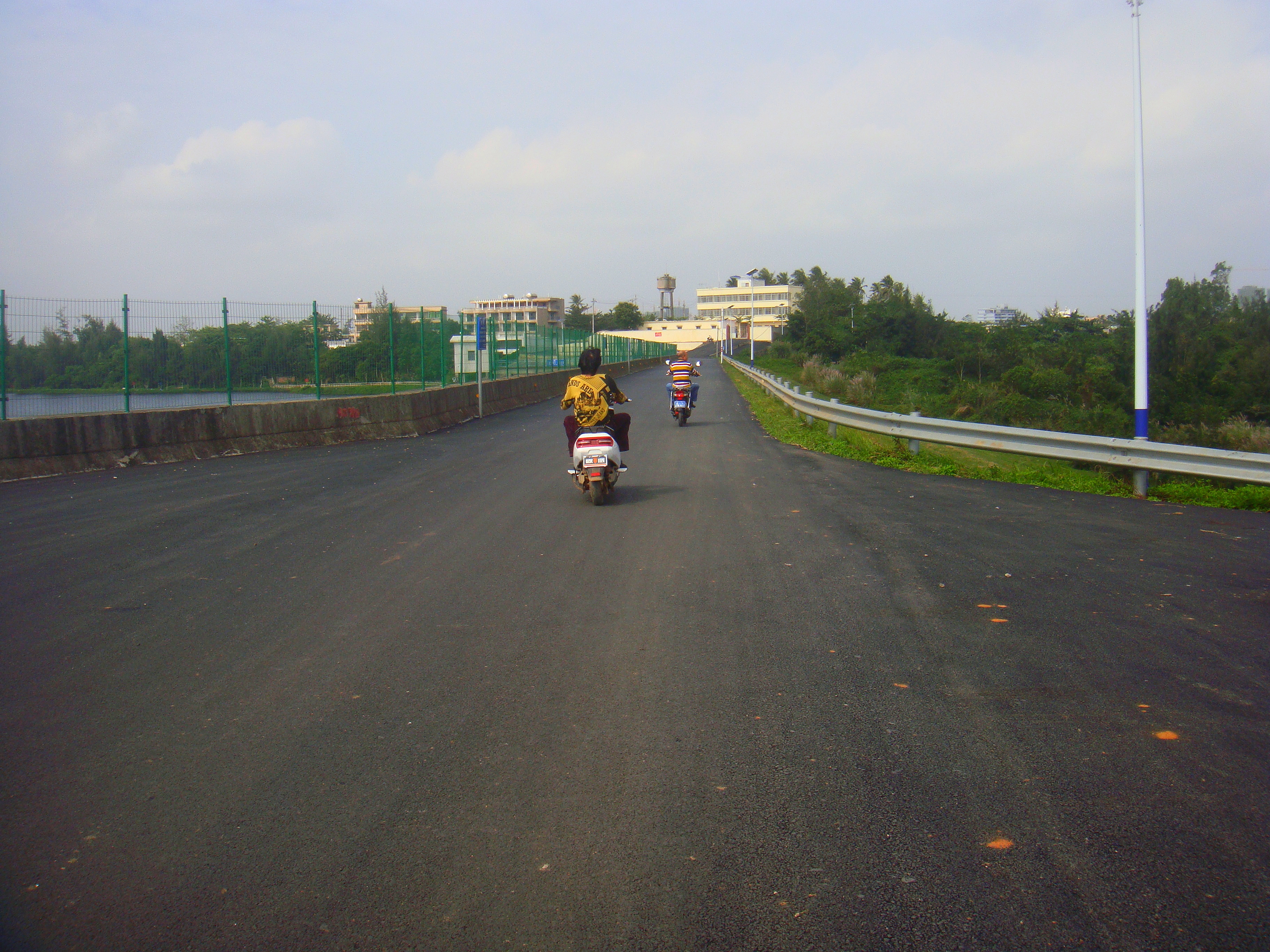
Dam road

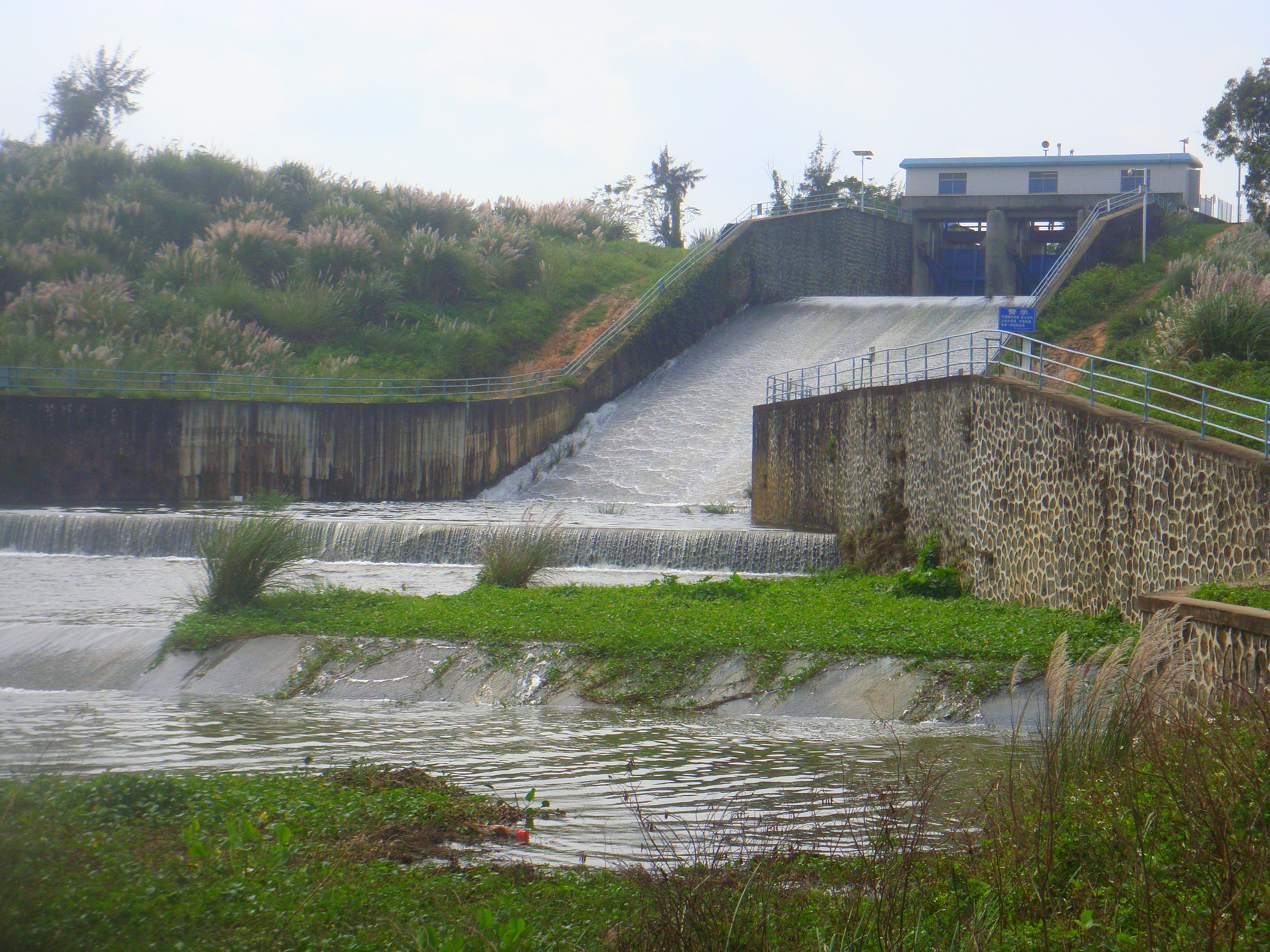
Spillway viewed from the bottom

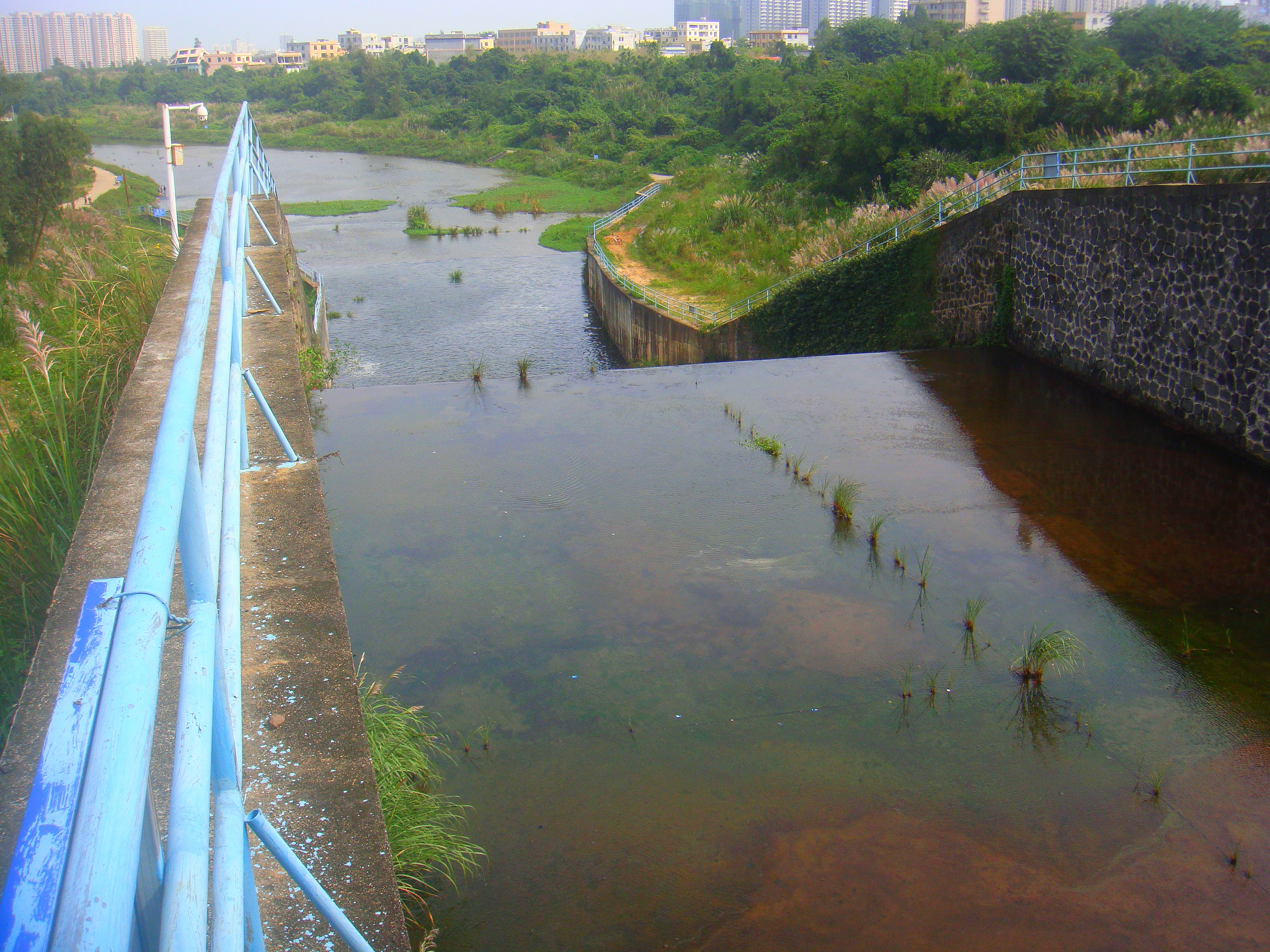
Spillway viewed from the top
