= Hainan Museum =

Museum in Haikou, China

Hainan Museum 海南省博物馆
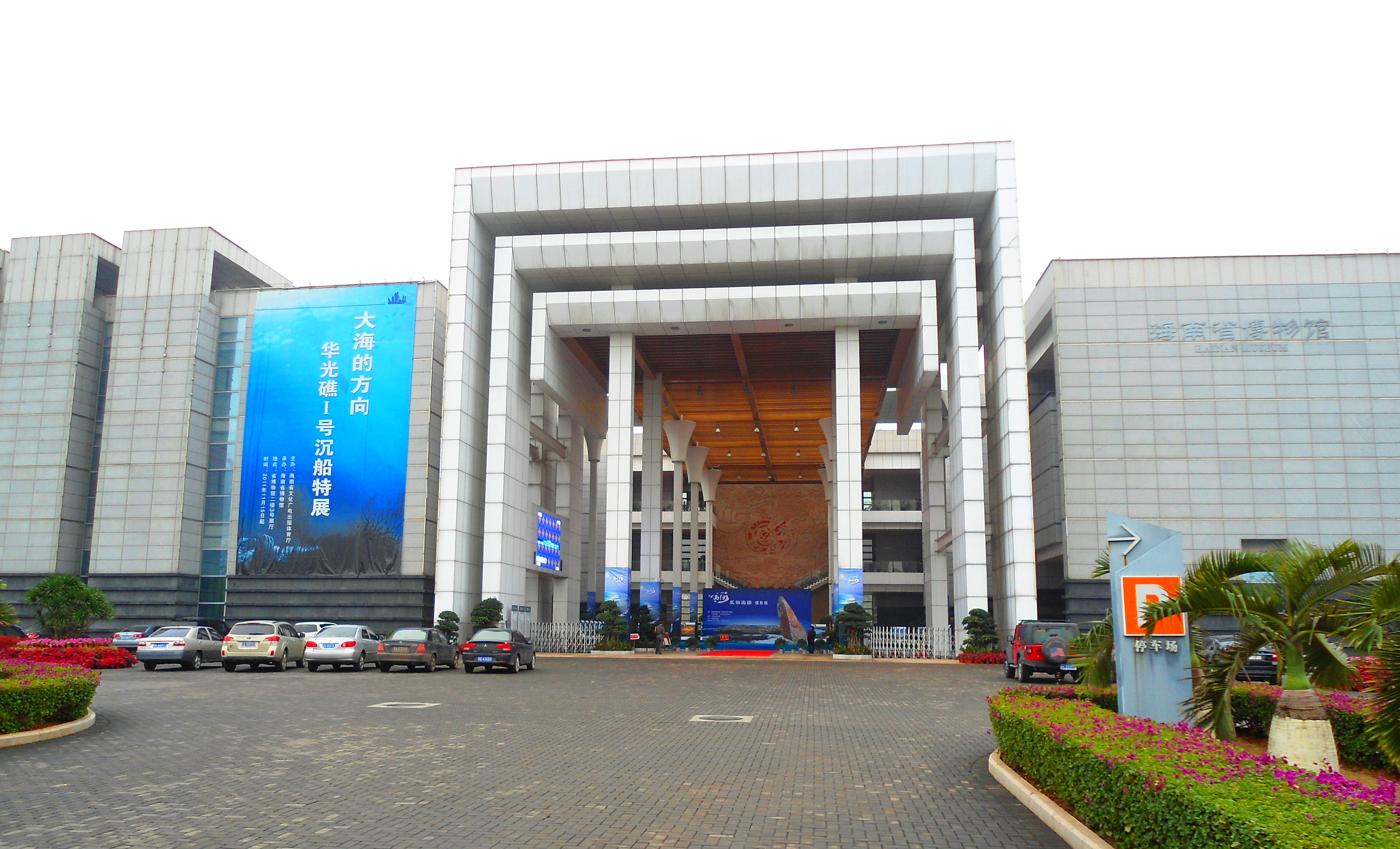
- Established: 1984
- Location: Haikou, Hainan, China
- Coordinates: 20.0157°N 110.3789°E
- Type: Artifacts
- Website: www.hainanmuseum.org

The Hainan Museum (Chinese: 海南省博物馆; pinyin: Hǎinán Shěng Bówùguǎn) is on Guoxing Avenue, Haikou, the capital city of Hainan Province, China. It was established in 1984, then moved to its permanent location in the Hainan Cultural Park at 68 Guoxing Avenue. There, it was officially reopened on November 15, 2008.

The facility is one of three large public works projects constructed around the same time on Guoxing Avenue alongside one another. The others are Hainan Library and Hainan Centre for the Performing Arts.

Since opening, it has received more than 800,000 visitors, including former leader Hu Jintao and Premier Li Keqiang.

== Facility ==
The entire museum area covers 40,000 square metres. The first phase contains 18,000 square meters comprising the following:

- 8,000-metre exhibition area
- Cultural relics storage
- Technical rooms
- Service facilities
- Small office buildings

The second phase of the project is in planning. It will have an area of 7,000 square meters and will contain the "Huaguangjiao One" shipwreck, where it will be restored and protected. It will house approximately 10,000 pieces of porcelain and other cultural relics and specimens pertaining to the history of the South China Sea, the maritime Silk Road, and items relating to geopolitics. It will also contain marine organisms and examples of mineral resources.

== Collections ==
Presently, the museum has over 20,000 items including cultural relics and multimedia.

== Exhibitions ==
=== Permanent ===
There are four basic permanent exhibitions:

- Collected Cultural Relics
- History of Hainan
- Minority Nationalities in Hainan
- Intangible Cultural Heritage in Hainan

=== Thematic ===
The museum has presented approximately 20 thematic exhibitions, including:

- Two Decades’ Development (exhibition on Hainan's Achievements in Building the Province and the Special Economic Zone in the Past Two Decades)
- Charm of Masters in Literature of the 20th Century
- Exhibition of Masterpieces of Asian Museum of Watercolor Art
- National Treasure Exhibition
- Exhibition of High and New Tech of Chinese Academy of Sciences and Tsinghua University

== Visitor information ==
Hainan Museum is open from 09:00 to 17:00. It is closed on Mondays. Entrance is free with a maximum of 3,000 tickets issued daily, until 16:30. Identification is required to obtain a ticket. Professional narrators and self-service audio guides are available in Chinese, English, Japanese, Russian and other languages.

== Partner museums ==
Hainan Museum is partnered with:

- National Museum of China
- Salon d'Automne
- Shanxi Museum
- Shandong Museum
- Nanjing Museum
- Hunan Museum

== See also ==
- List of museums in China
- Hainan Science and Technology Museum
