= Mount Royal University =

Public university in Calgary, Alberta, Canada

Coordinates: 51°0′49.09″N 114°8′0.54″W

- Motto: Quam Bene Non Quantum
- Motto in English: How well, not how much
- Type: Public
- Established: 1910; 116 years ago
- Affiliations: AUCC, U Sports, AACTI, CBIE, CONAHEC
- Endowment: C$99 million
- Chancellor: Arlene Strom
- President: Tim Rahilly
- Provost: Chad London
- Faculty: 740
- Students: 11,560 (2023-24 fulltime equivalent)
- Undergraduates: 12,505
- Location: Calgary, Alberta, Canada
- Campus: Lincoln Park (Urban) Springbank (Urban)
- Colours: Blue, Lincoln Blue, Focus Blue, White, Silver
- Nickname: Cougars
- Mascot: Calvin
- Website: mtroyal.ca

Mount Royal University (MRU) is a public university in Calgary, Alberta, Canada. Originally “Mount Royal College,” Mount Royal University was granted university status in 2009 by the provincial government. The university has an average class size of 30 students and currently offers 13 degrees and 37 majors, in addition to diplomas, post-bachelor certificates and a variety of credit-free programs.

== History ==
Mount Royal University was founded on December 16, 1910, by Alberta provincial charter under the Arthur Sifton government and officially opened on September 8, 1911. Originally "Mount Royal College", the institution was the brainchild of Calgary Reverend George W. Kerby (1860-1944) who sought an opportunity for higher education to benefit young people from rural homes in the area. The provincial charter as presented in the legislature by R. B. Bennett was titled "Bill 48, An Act respecting the Calgary College". However, Premier Sifton, Kerby, and others agreed not to use Calgary for the name of the new college.

In 1931, Mount Royal became a post-secondary institution as Mount Royal Junior College (MRC), offering transfer courses to the University of Alberta and later to the University of Calgary. In 1972, Mount Royal moved from several buildings in downtown Calgary to a new campus in Lincoln Park on land previously used as an air force base. A war memorial honour roll is dedicated to Mount Royal alumni who have volunteered for active service in the Canadian Forces.

In 2017, Mount Royal University was awarded the Ashoka Changemaker Campus designation, joining 44 universities which were thought to be leading higher education in the area of social innovation and changemaking.

== Academics ==
=== Faculties ===
- Faculty of Arts
  - Economics, Justice, and Policy Studies
  - English, Languages, and Cultures
  - Humanities
  - Interior Design
  - Psychology
  - Sociology and Anthropology
- Bissett School of Business
  - Accounting
  - Aviation
  - Finance
  - General Management
  - Human Resources
  - Innovation & Entrepreneurship
  - International Business
  - Marketing
  - Social Innovation
  - Supply Chain Management
- School of Communication Studies
  - Broadcast Media Studies
  - Information Design
  - Journalism
  - Public Relations
- Faculty of Health, Community and Education
  - Child Studies and Social Work
  - Education
  - Health and Physical Education
  - School of Nursing and Midwifery
- Faculty of Science and Technology
  - Biology
  - Chemistry and Physics
  - Earth and Environmental Sciences
  - Mathematics and Computing
- Faculty of Continuing Education

=== Institutes ===
- Institute for Community Prosperity
- Institute for Innovation and Entrepreneurship
- Miistakis Institute

=== Centres ===
- Centre for Community Disaster Research
- Centre for Health and Innovation in Aging
- Iniskim Centre
- Mokakiiks Centre for Scholarship of Teaching

=== Studios ===
- Trico Changemakers Studio

=== Research Hubs ===
- QriTical Queer + Trans Research Hub

=== Performing Arts Centre ===
In July 2015, the $69.69 million Taylor Centre for the Performing Arts (TCPA) officially opened, accommodating the growing Mount Royal Conservatory, which is a musical conservatoire in operation since 1910 that serves up to 10,000 Calgarians annually. The TCPA houses 43 soundproof rehearsal studios, six ensemble suites, and the 787-seat Bella Concert Hall (opened August 26, 2015) designed by Pfeiffer Partners Architects in cooperation with Sahuri + Partners, who used a "contemporary interpretation of the rural barn on the expansive prairie of Alberta" in their design. The Taylor Centre for the Performing Arts is named after the family name of businessman, philanthropist, and Calgarian Don Taylor who donated $21-million to the project. Additionally, the namesake of the Bella Concert Hall is Mary Belle Taylor, Don Taylor's mother, who was affectionately known as 'Bella.' In addition to its design, the Taylor Centre for the Performing Arts is notable for being a LEED Gold certified building and for being highly accessible for users with diverse physical abilities. While built with the needs of the Mount Royal Conservatory in mind, the TCPA and its various spaces are considered a community resource.

=== Library ===
Mount Royal University officially opened the Riddell Library and Learning Centre on September 7, 2017, replacing the previous library, which opened in 1972. The Riddell Library is named after Calgary businessman Clay Riddell who contributed a sizeable donation to the project. The $100 million facility features more than 16,000-square-metres of space, 34 study rooms, 1,700 seats, access to 3D printing, and even a cafe.

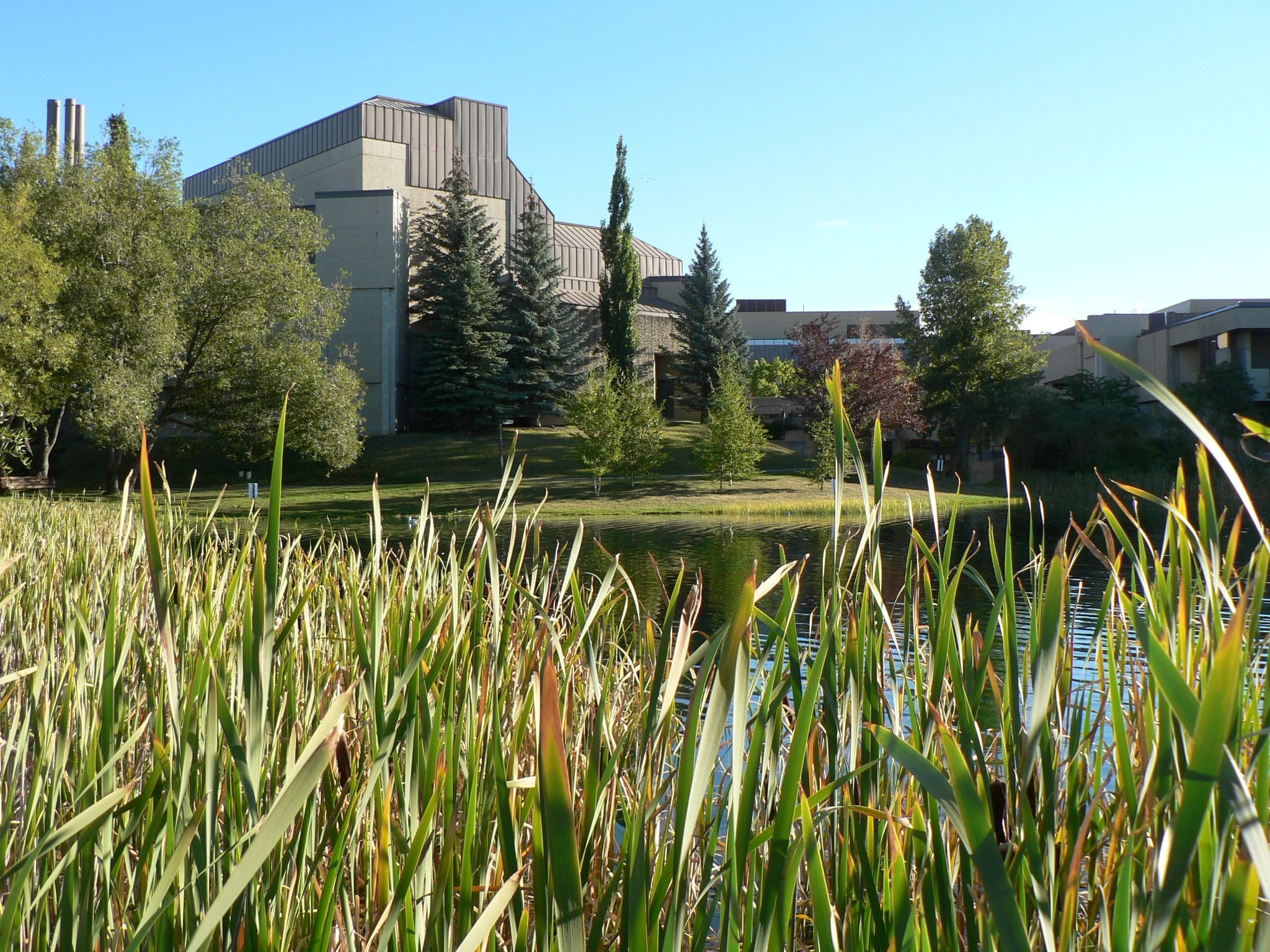
Mount Royal University from across the pond

== Athletics ==
The Mount Royal University athletic nickname is the Cougars. The Cougars transitioned to Canada's top level of amateur athletics for the 2012–13 season, moving to the Canadian Interuniversity Sport Canada West conference (since re-named U Sports). The university supports eight teams competing in men’s and women’s basketball, hockey, soccer and volleyball.

== Notable alumni ==
Notable alumni of the university include:

- Doris Anderson (1939); editor of Chatelaine magazine from 1957 to 1977. She continued her advocacy for women's right as Chair of the Advisory Council on the Status of Women, President of the National Action Committee on the Status of Women and President of Fair Vote Canada.
- Paul Brandt (Nursing, 1992); most awarded male country musician in Canadian history. He was a pediatric nurse in 1996 at the time of the release of his first single My Heart Has a History, propelled him to international musical success.
- Leslie Feist (Mount Royal Conservatory); Juno award-winning indie pop artist.
- John de Chastelain; Canadian soldier and diplomat who heads the Independent International Commission on Decommissioning.
- Marie Clements (Journalism); Métis playwright, performer, and director
- Chris Gailus (Journalism, 1989); Emmy Award-winning news anchor. After leaving Calgary in 2000, he worked in Dallas and then New York before joining the Global BC team in Vancouver as weekend anchor.
- Bret Hart; professional wrestler.
- Kent Hehr; former Alberta MLA, member of parliament and Minister of Veterans Affairs.
- Norman Kwong (Commercial, 1949); former CFL player and was installed as Alberta’s 15th Lieutenant Governor on Jan. 20, 2005. He was the first person of Chinese heritage to serve in either profession.
- Alvin Law; motivational speaker.
- Bruce McCulloch (Public Relations); successful director, writer, actor and comedian who has won several Gemini Awards and received multiple Emmy Award nominations. He is best known for his work as a member of The Kids in the Hall and as a writer for Saturday Night Live.
- Kirby Morrow; professional voice actor.
- Dave Pierce; Emmy-winning composer.
- Jullien Ramírez; Canadian professional soccer player
- Alison Redford; Premier of Alberta from 2011 to 2014.
- Jasmine Richardson; high-profile murderer.
- Riley Sawchuk; Canadian professional ice hockey player
- Kavan Smith; Canadian actor.
- Harnarayan Singh; Play-by-play commentator for Sportsnet (Hockey Night in Canada, Hockey Night in Punjabi)
- The PropheC; Indo-Canadian singer
- Yuja Wang; classical pianist.

== Arms ==
Coat of arms of the Mount Royal University
Notes Granted April 15, 2011 Crest A demi-bighorn sheep Or muzzled Argent accorné and unguled Azure its dexter hoof resting on a closed book Proper bound Azure charged with a dove descending Argent. Escutcheon Argent three piles reversed throughout on a chief Azure a mace Or embellished Argent. Supporters Two cougars Or each supporting on the shoulder a mace Azure embellished Argent and standing on a rocky mount Argent. Motto Quam Bene Non Quantum (How Well, Not How Much)
