= Guoxing Avenue =

Street in Haikou, China

Guoxing Avenue Chinese: 国兴大道
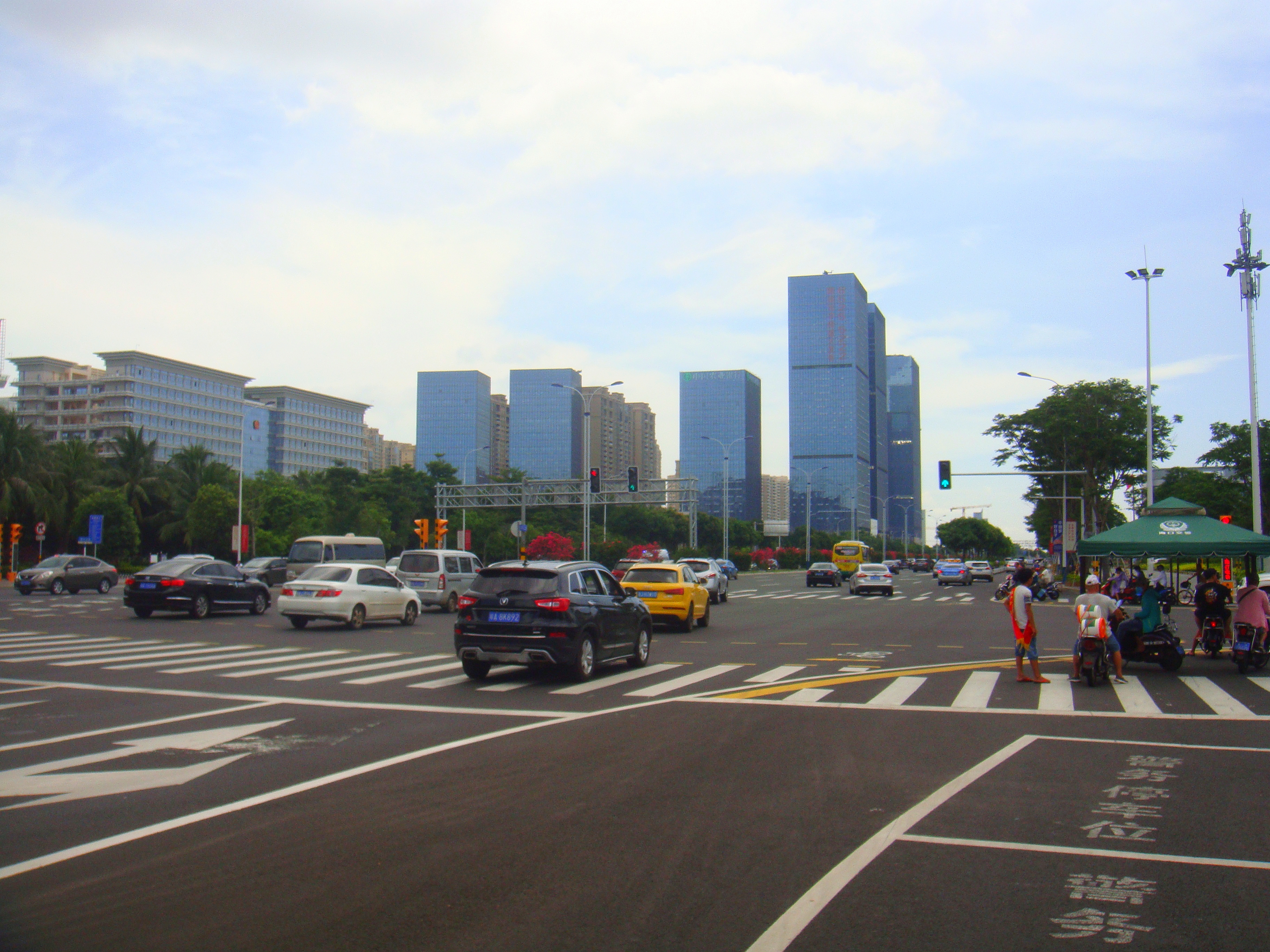
- Guoxing Avenue's west part looking east at the International Tourism and Central Business District
- Length: 5 km (3.1 mi)
- East end: Qiongzhou Bridge over the Nandu River
- West end: Longkun Road

Construction
- Inauguration: 2005 circa.

Guoxing Avenue (Chinese: 国兴大道) is a major street in Haikou, Hainan, China. It runs in an east-west direction in the heart of the city. Its west end terminates at Longkun Road and its east end terminates at the Qiongzhou Bridge which crosses the Nandu River.

== History ==
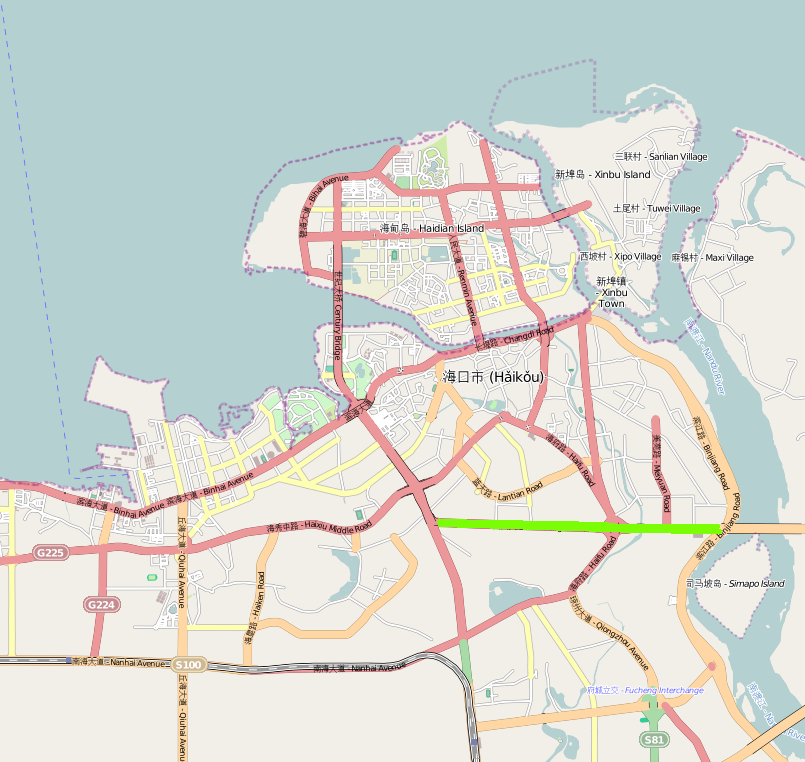
Map showing location of Guoxing Avenue in green

Guoxing Avenue was once Haikou's main airport (since relocated to Haikou Meilan International Airport southeast of the city centre). Built around 2005, the avenue was first seldom used for vehicular traffic route. Most of the land on the north and south sides were unoccupied. It has since become a heavily trafficked road.

In 2017, the west end was connected to a newly built road that provides access to the new neighbourhood 'Haikou West Coast' located around 7 km west of the Haikou city centre. The east end of Guoxing connects to the route to Haikou Meilan International Airport.

== Notable locations ==
Guoxing can be considered as having two parts separated by the north-south Haifu Road:

=== West ===
The west part contains the following:

- A group of apartment and office buildings on the extreme west end on both the north and south sides
- HNA Building, the headquarters of Hainan Airlines
- International Tourism and Central Business District, a cluster of new office towers
- Riyue Mall, the largest plaza in the city
- Haikou Tower complex, under-construction
- Hainan Government Planning Exhibition Centre

=== East ===
The east part contains the following:

- The Meishe River flows under Guoxing approximately 250 metres east of Haifu Road
- Hainan Museum
- Hainan Library
- Hainan Centre for the Performing Arts
- Shopping mall
- Haikou College of Economics, just off Guoxing
- Hainan Provincial P.E. Games Centre, a sports arena just off Guoxing
- Hainan Provincial Public Servants' Committee
