= Performing Arts Center =

A performing arts center is a multi-use performance space or cluster of spaces.

Performing Arts Center may also refer to:

- Performing Arts Center (Kansas City)
- Performing Arts Center of Los Angeles County
- Performing Arts Center (Manhattan)
- Performing Arts Center of Rapid City
- The Performing Arts Center at Purchase

== See also ==
- Centre for Performing Arts (disambiguation)
