= Hainan Centre for the Performing Arts =

Coordinates: 20.017052°N 110.370734°E

Hainan Centre for the Performing Arts 海南省歌舞剧院

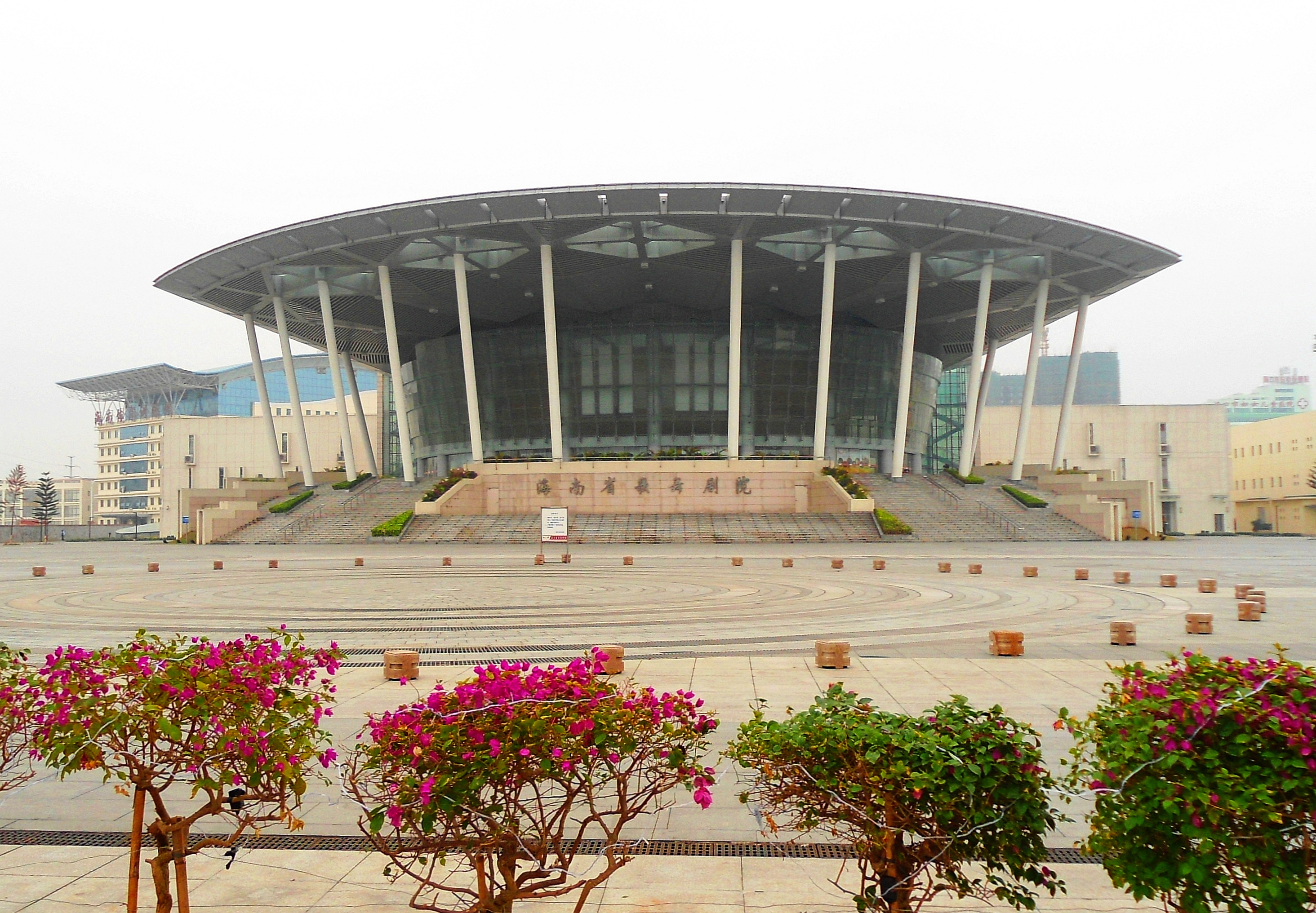

- Interactive map of the Hainan Centre for the Performing Arts 海南省歌舞剧院 area

General information
- Type: Performing arts complex
- Location: Haikou, Hainan, China
- Construction started: March 2008
- Completed: September 2010
- Opened: 1 October 2010
- Cost: CN¥200,000,000

Technical details
- Floor area: 25,000 m^{2}

The Hainan Song and Dance Theatre (Chinese: 海南省歌舞剧院; pinyin: Hǎinánshěng Gēwǔ Jùyuàn), formerly known as Hainan Centre for the Performing Arts is located at 68 Guoxing Avenue in Haikou, Hainan, China. The entire facility is 25,000 m^{2}, with an 8,253 m^{2} auxiliary space, and a theatre space of 2,657 m^{2}. The venue can accommodate up to 1,230 people. The cost of construction was 200 million Chinese yuan.

The facility is one of three large, cultural infrastructure projects constructed around the same time on Guoxing Avenue alongside one another, the others being Hainan Provincial Museum and Hainan Provincial Library.

Construction of the theatre began in March 2008, was completed in September 2010, and the premiere was held on October 1 of the same year.
