= Hainan Center =

Skyscraper in Haikou, Hainan, China

Coordinates: 20.01563°N 110.35925°E

- 海南中心
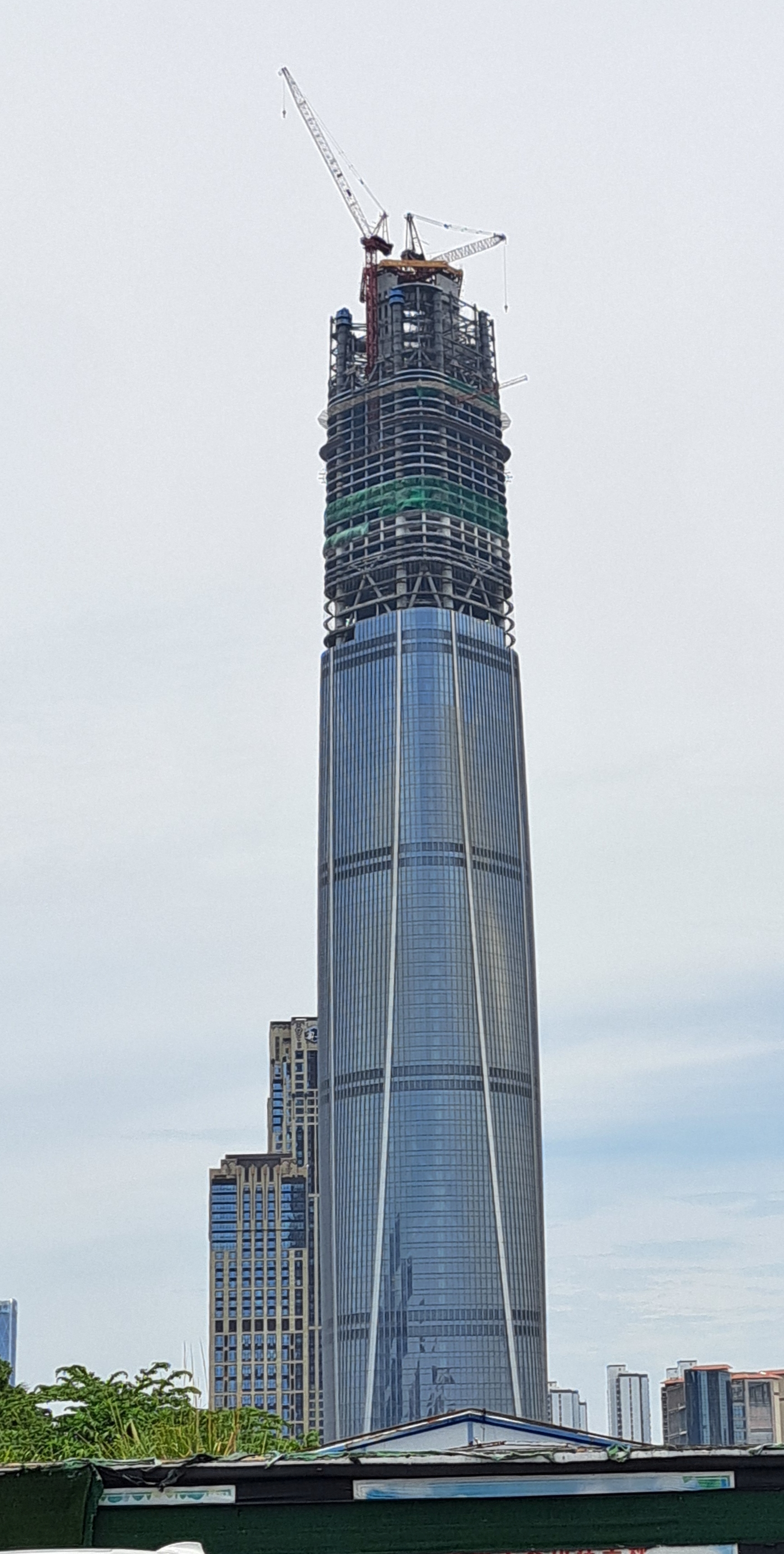
- Hainan Center in June 2026
- Interactive map of the Hainan Center area
- Former names: Haikou Tower

General information
- Status: Structurally Topped out
- Type: Supertall skyscraper
- Location: Guoxing Avenue, Haikou, China
- Named for: City of Haikou
- Construction started: September 28, 2015
- Completed: 2027
- Client: City of Haikou

Height
- Architectural: 428 meters

Technical details
- Material: Composite
- Floor count: 94
- Floor area: 387,669 square metres
- Lifts/elevators: 51

Design and construction
- Architecture firm: HENN Architeken
- Engineer: China IPPR International Engineering Corporation
- Other designers: China IPPR International Engineering Corporation Structural Engineer

Hainan Center (Chinese: 海南中心) is an under-construction supertall skyscraper on Guoxing Avenue, Haikou, Hainan, China.

Once owned by HNA, and part of a suite of 10 buildings, construction was halted in early 2018 on this main tower due to financial problems. It sat for several years incomplete, and since around the beginning of 2024, was taken over by the government. Construction is being done by China Railway Construction Corporation and is expected to be finished by late 2027.

== History ==
Prior to 2026, Hainan Center was known as Haikou Tower (Chinese: 海口塔), or Haikou Tower 1, and was part of suite of ten buildings on a site called Haikou Towers or Hainan International Exchange Square. It would have been the tallest in the suite of buildings.

The project began on September 28, 2015 with expected completion sometime between 2020 and 2027. However, the project was stopped in early 2018 for financial reasons. Some buildings in the suite were sold off and continued to be built by other developers, but construction of this main tower and second largest tower were abandoned.

The entire project was originally divided into two parts: one running along the north side of Guoxing and the other of similar size and shape on the south side. Each part would have contained five buildings: two small buildings at the west, a central tower, and two small buildings at the east. The south part would have been home to the tallest building called 'Haikou Tower 1'. The ten buildings would have ranged from 150 to 450 metres high with an overall building area of 1.5 million square metres.

== Current construction ==
Rendering of the Haikou Tower

The main building will be a 94-storey tower with a height of 428 metres (1,404 ft). Completion of the tower will be some time late 2026.

The tower will have 94 floors above ground and 2 below, served by 51 elevators. The top, hotel portion of the tower will have a central void.

The lower two-thirds of the building will contain 185,000 square metres of office space. The top portion will be 46,000 square metres of office space.

The tower will contain 356 apartments and 288 hotel rooms. A total of 1,952 parking spaces will be available.

== See also ==
- List of tallest buildings in China
