= National Centre for the Performing Arts =

National Centre for the Performing Arts may refer to

- National Centre for the Performing Arts (China), in Beijing, China
- National Centre for the Performing Arts (India), in Mumbai, India
- John F. Kennedy Center for the Performing Arts (formerly National Center for the Performing Arts), in Washington D.C., United States

== See also ==
- Centre for the Performing Arts (disambiguation)
