= Performing arts center =

Multi-use performance space

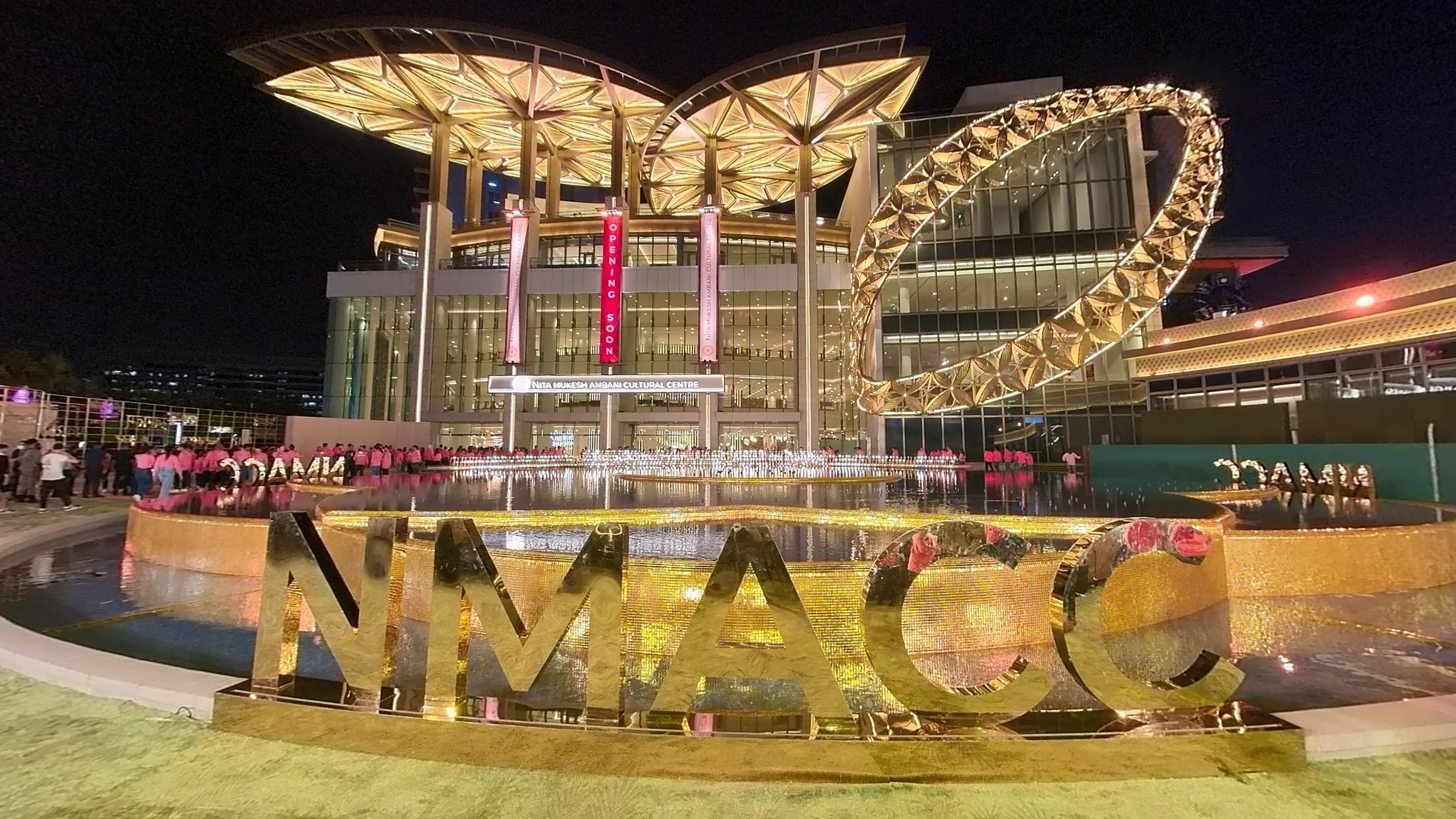
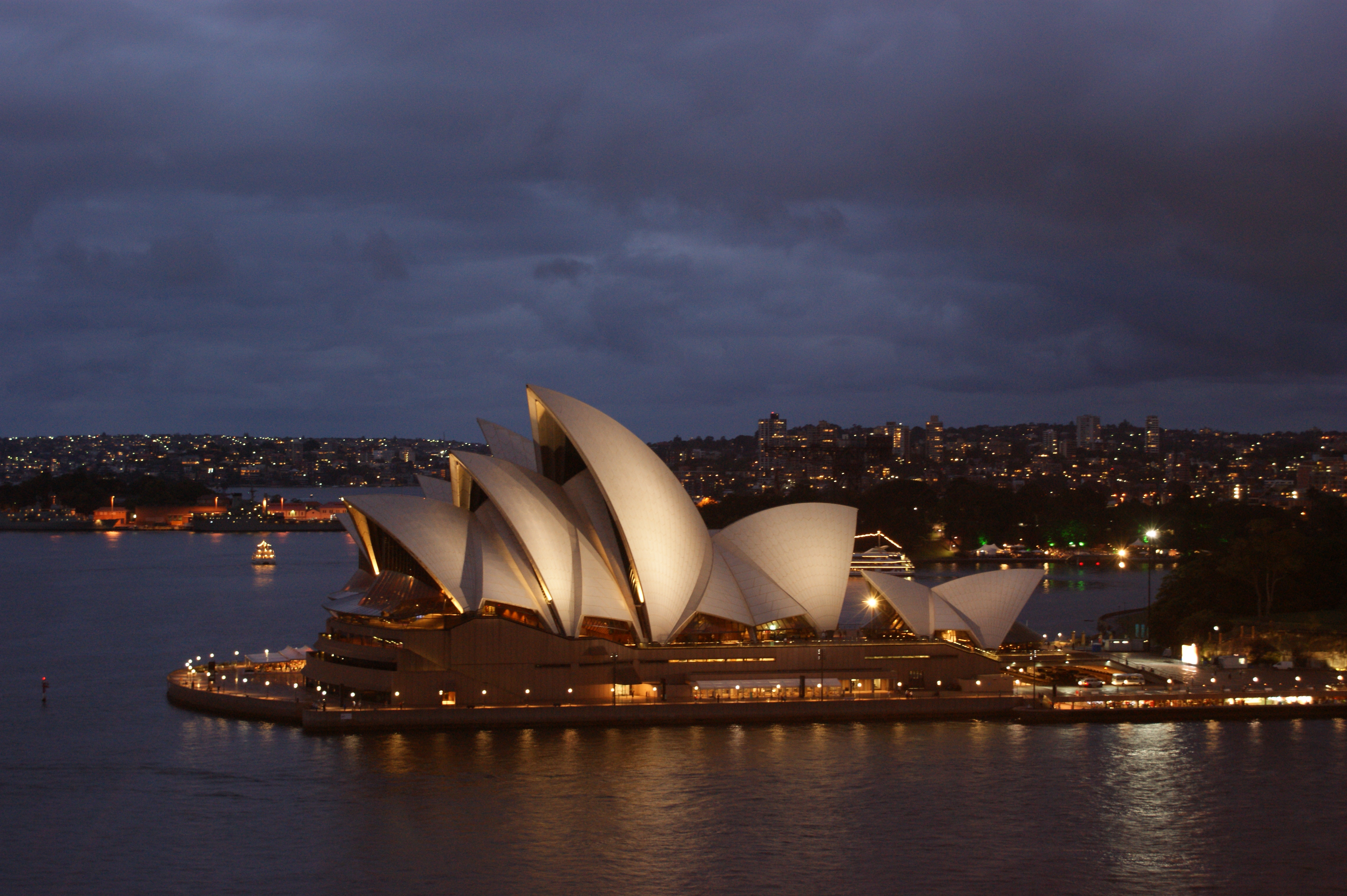

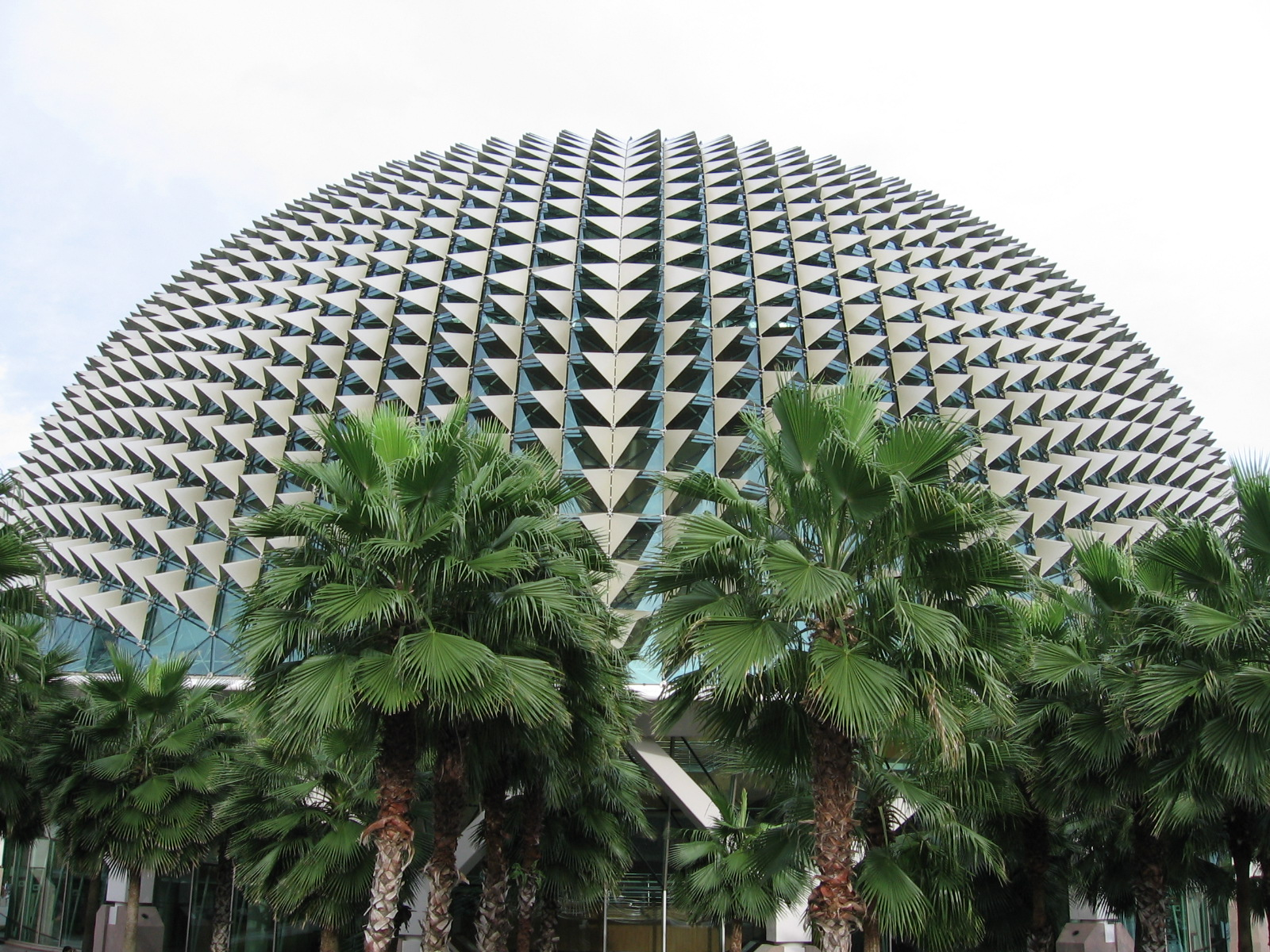
NMACC, Sydney Opera House and The Esplanade

Performing arts center/centre (see spelling differences), often abbreviated as PAC, is usually a complex housing performance spaces for various performing arts, including dance, music, and theatre. In some cases it refers to a single multi-use space, or alternatively, to a performing arts college.

== History ==
Starting in the 6th century BC, the Classical period of performing art began in Greece, ushered in by the tragic poets such as Sophocles. These poets wrote plays which, in some cases, incorporated dance (see Euripides). The Hellenistic period began the widespread use of comedy. Much of which was performed live in a center-point of the community.

In 1576, Britain's first playhouse, "The Theatre", was built in Finsbury Fields, London. It was constructed by Leicester's Men – an acting company formed in 1559 from members of the Earl of Leicester's household.

New performing arts centers emerged in the latter part of the 20th century as a means of generating new investment and increased economic activity and thus, a means for revitalizing neighborhoods as patrons are drawn to local restaurants and other businesses. PACs became a draw for touring shows and eventually included visual art in their facilities. Today, these centers are valuable civic resources that provide education, access, exchange of creative discourse, opportunities for cultural expression and awareness.

== Description ==
=== Multi-use performance spaces ===
A multi-use performance space is a single space intended for use by various types of performing arts, including dance, music and theatre.

The intended multiple use of performing arts centers in this sense differentiates them from single-purpose concert halls, opera houses, or theatres, although the actual use of single-purpose spaces for other than their intended use is widespread. This sort of space has a long history, extending to the Roman Colosseum and Greek amphitheatres.

=== Performance space complexes ===
A cluster of performance spaces, either separate buildings or under one roof, each space designed for a specific purpose such as symphonic music or chamber music or theatre, but multipurpose as a whole, are also described as performing arts centers. The modern version of this came into being only in the 1960s.

=== Colleges ===
In Australia, the Centre for the Performing in Adelaide was the predecessor college of the Adelaide College of the Arts. The Aboriginal Centre for the Performing Arts is a college for Indigenous Australians in Brisbane.

== Governance ==
Some performing arts center organizations act as sole presenters for events using the venues within the center, but most also frequently rent their performance spaces to other performing arts presenters or self-presenting performing arts groups. An example of this practice is the Celebrity Series of Boston renting venues in Boston's Boch Center.

== Specific venues ==
Examples of performance arts complexes include the Kennedy Center in Washington, D.C., the Sydney Opera House, and the Lincoln Center in New York City.

For a selection of venues with these terms in their titles, see:

- Centre for Performing Arts (disambiguation)
- National Centre for the Performing Arts (disambiguation)
- Performing Arts Center (disambiguation)

== See also ==
- Auditorium
- List of concert halls
- List of contemporary amphitheatres
- List of opera houses
