= Hainan Library =

Library in Haikou, China

Hainan Library 海南省图书馆

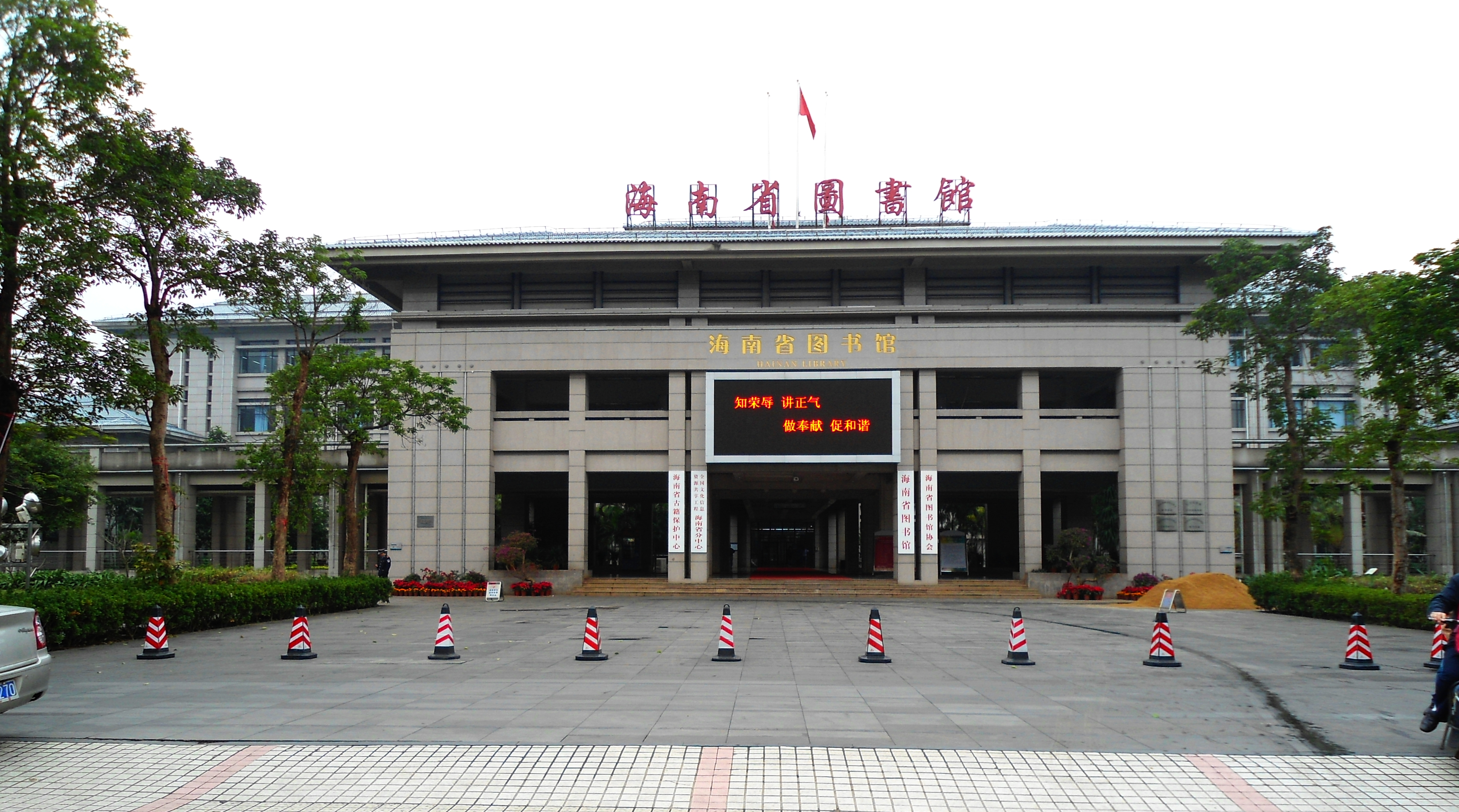
- Front entrance
- 20°01′02″N 110°22′02″E
- Location: Qiongshan, Haikou, Hainan, China
- Type: Public library
- Established: 2007
- Branches: 1

Other information
- Website: hilib.com

The Hainan Library (海南省图书馆) is located in the Hainan Cultural Park at 36 Guoxing Avenue, Haikou, Hainan, China. It was established on February 2, 2007.

The facility is one of three large, public works projects constructed around the same time on Guoxing Avenue alongside one another, the others being Hainan Museum and Hainan Centre for the Performing Arts.

== See also ==
- Libraries in the People's Republic of China
- Chinese Library Classification (CLC)
- Archives in the People's Republic of China
- List of libraries in China
