= Centre for Performing Arts =

(The) Centre for Performing Arts, Centre for the Performing Arts, Center for Performing Arts, or Center for the Performing Arts may refer to:

== Australia ==
- Aboriginal Centre for the Performing Arts, a training college in Brisbane, Queensland
- Centre for the Performing Arts, Adelaide, the predecessor college to Adelaide College of the Arts, Adelaide, South Australia
- Wendouree Centre for the Performing Arts, Ballarat, Victoria

== Canada ==
- Calgary Centre for the Performing Arts, Calgary, Alberta
- Chan Centre for the Performing Arts, University of British Columbia, Vancouver
- Charles W. Stockey Centre for the Performing Arts, Parry Sound, BC
- Four Seasons Centre for the Performing Arts, Toronto, Ontario
- Meridian Arts Centre, Toronto, formerly known as Ford Centre for the Performing Arts and Sony Centre for the Performing Arts
- Oakville Centre for the Performing Arts, Oakville, Ontario
- O'Keefe Centre for the Performing Arts, Toronto, Ontario
- Richmond Hill Centre for the Performing Arts, Richmond Hill, Ontario
- Ronald V. Joyce Centre for the Performing Arts at Hamilton Place, former name of FirstOntario Concert Hall, Hamilton, Ontario
- Sanderson Centre for the Performing Arts, Brantford, Ontario
- Taylor Centre for the Performing Arts, Mount Royal University, Calgary, Alberta
- Young Centre for the Performing Arts, a theatre in Toronto, Ontario

== United States ==
- Broward Center for the Performing Arts, Fort Lauderdale, Florida
- Bushnell Center for the Performing Arts, Hartford, Connecticut
- Cerritos Center for the Performing Arts, Cerritos, California
- Denver Center for the Performing Arts, Denver, Colorado
- Dr. Phillips Center for the Performing Arts, Orlando, Florida
- Hobby Center for the Performing Arts, Houston, Texas
- Hult Center for the Performing Arts, Eugene, Oregon
- John F. Kennedy Center for the Performing Arts, Washington, D.C.
- Kauffman Center for the Performing Arts, Kansas City, Missouri
- Kimmel Center for the Performing Arts, Philadelphia, Pennsylvania
- King Center for the Performing Arts, Melbourne, Florida
- Kravis Center for the Performing Arts, West Palm Beach, Florida
- Lincoln Center for the Performing Arts, New York City, United States
- Mann Center for the Performing Arts, Philadelphia, Pennsylvania
- Mountain View Center for the Performing Arts, Mountain View, California
- Smith Center for the Performing Arts, Las Vegas, Nevada
- Straz Center for the Performing Arts, Tampa, Florida
- Tobin Center for the Performing Arts, San Antonio, Texas

== Other countries ==
- Helix Centre for the Performing Arts, Dublin, Ireland
- Sejong Center for the Performing Arts, Seoul, Korea
- National Centre for the Performing Arts (India), Mumbai
- Hainan Centre for the Performing Arts, Haikou, Hainan, China
- Jerusalem Centre for the Performing Arts, a.k.a. Jerusalem Theatre, Jerusalem
- National Centre for the Performing Arts (China), Beijing

== See also ==
- Performing arts center (disambiguation)
