= Meishe River National Wetland Park =

Park in Haikou, China

Coordinates: 19.9802°N 110.3565°E

- 美舍国家湿地公园
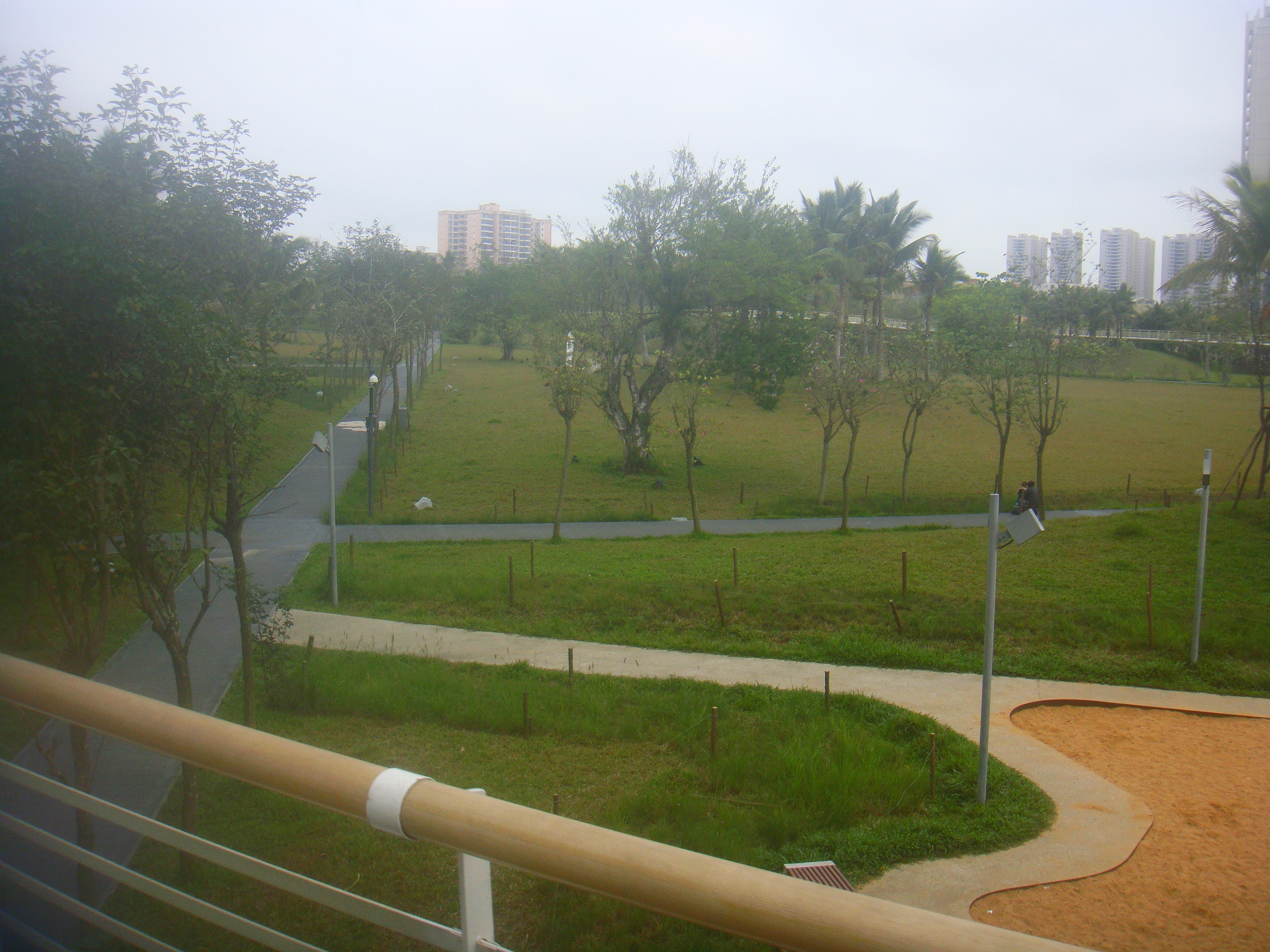
- Interactive map of Meishe River National Wetland Park
- Location: Haikou, Hainan, China
- Area: 14,000 square meters
- Opened: 2018
- Status: Open all year
- Terrain: Terraced
- Habitats: Waterfowl
- Water: Meishe River

The Meishe River National Wetland Park (Chinese: 美舍国家湿地公园) is an eco-park on the banks for the Meishe River in Haikou, Hainan, China. It is located on the north side of Yehai Avenue, around 1.5 km east of Haikou East railway station and Longqun Avenue.

It was built over a nine-month period around 2017. The park covers 14,000 square meters, and is situated on top of a former waste dump. It is a terraced field with eight stages, the largest of its kind in China. This wetland park can treat 5,000 to 8,000 metric tons of household sewage per day.

It is now an urban oasis inhabited by water plants, such as water lilies and irises, and numerous species of waterfowl including egrets.
