= Taylor Centre for the Performing Arts =

Performing arts centre

The Taylor Centre for the Performing Arts is performing arts centre located on the campus of Mount Royal University in Calgary, Alberta, Canada. Completed in 2015, it is home to the 787-seat Bella Concert Hall.

== History ==
The idea of a new performing arts centre to accommodate the growing Mount Royal Conservatory was planned as far back as 1999, but did not move forward until construction began in 2011. The creation of the Taylor Centre was made possible by a $21 million donation from Don Taylor of the Taylor family, which spurred further donations, such as from the federal government ($20 million), the provincial government ($20 million), and the municipal government ($10.3 million). Additional funding came from financing, donors, and university reserves for a total of $19.2 million in additional funds.

Construction began in 2011 and took four years to complete. The centre opened in July 2015, except for the Bella Concert Hall, which opened in August 2015. The total cost came to over $90 million.

== See also ==
- List of concert halls
