= Meishe River =

Chinese river

Coordinates: 19.9802°N 110.3565°E

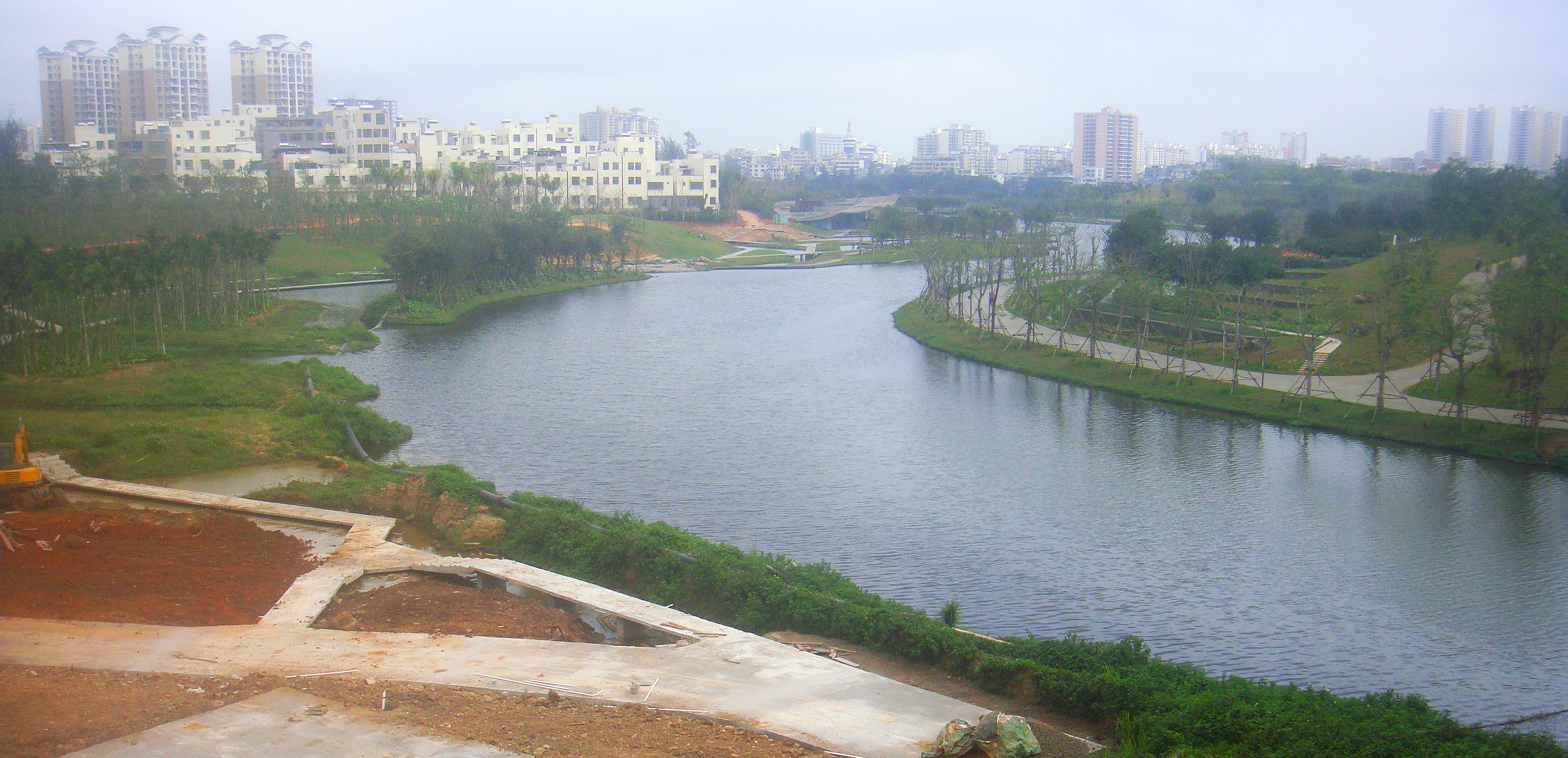
- Meishe River entering Meishe River National Wetland Park
- Native name: 美舍河 (Chinese)

Physical characteristics
- Source: Shapo Reservoir
  - location: Haikou, Hainan, China
- Mouth: Haidian River
  - location: Haikou, Hainan, China
- Length: 10 km (6.2 mi)

The Meishe River (Chinese: 美舍河) is a river within Haikou City, Hainan, China. Its source is the spillway at the east end of the Shapo Reservoir located just south of the city. The Meishe flows eastward under Longkun Road south of the Haikou East Railway Station. It then turns north, past the Meishe River National Wetland Park and winds northward through the east side of urban Haikou, under Guoxing Avenue, finally emptying into the Haidian River just east of Heping Bridge.

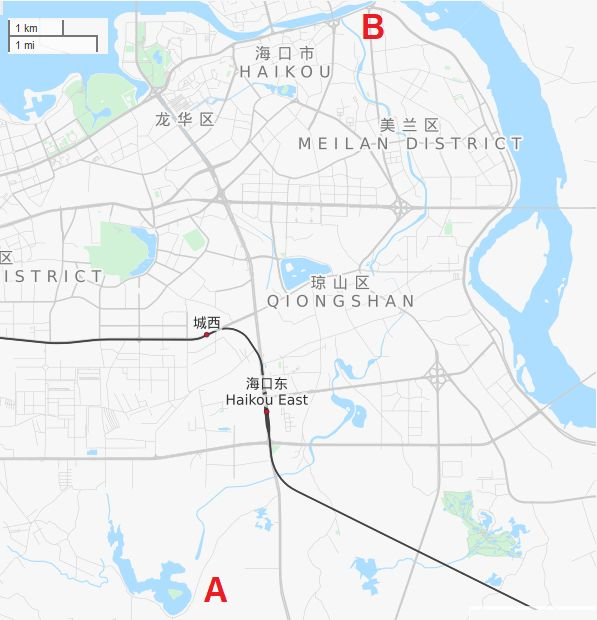
Meishe River showing source (A) at Shapo Reservoir and mouth (B) at Haidian River

From about 2015 to 2026, extensive renovations were made to much of the land on either side of the river, including walking paths and landscaping.
