= Chapeau (disambiguation) =

A chapeau is a flat-topped hat once worn by senior clerics.

Chapeau may also refer to:

- Hat
- Chapeau, Allier, a commune in central France
- Chapeau, Quebec, a village on Allumette Island in the Outaouais region of Quebec, Canada
- The preliminary comments in a trade agreement, prior to the specific terms and conditions.
