= Decima Gallery =

London-based arts projects organisation

Decima Gallery (also Decima Projects, Decima International Arts or Decima) is a London-based arts projects organisation with a reputation for irreverent projects. It is owned and managed by David West, Alex Chappel, Larry McGinity and Mark Reeves.

Decima have occupied various physical spaces since 1997 and have also staged a number of projects hosted by other venues, in London and around the world, including major London spaces such as the Tate Modern, the Victoria and Albert Museum and the Whitechapel Gallery. Decima have also staged many conceptual, event-based and media-based projects. Ralph Rugoff in a 1998 edition of Frieze called them "Neo-Publicists", describing them as not just seeking press coverage, but using mass media as an artistic medium.

As well as staging art projects, events, and club nights, Decima deals in limited edition books and prints, specialising in Gilbert & George and Stephen Gill.

A 2008 article in The London Paper described the gallery as "infamous" for its headline-grabbing stunts in the late 1990s, including the hoax "Fuckart & Pimp" exhibition where Angela Marshall pretended to offer her artwork in exchange for oral sex, the show "Was Jesus a Homosexual?" and the time that curators Alex Chappel and David West gatecrashed the Tate dressed as a pantomime cow to "make people think".

== Origin ==
David C. West worked with the Factual Nonsense Gallery alongside Joshua Compston before Compston's death on 5 March 1996. Among projects on which they collaborated was The Jack Duckworth Memorial Clinic, a spoof clinic for soap opera addicts.

In 1996, West, along with Alex Chappel, formed a "media terrorist" group called a.r.t. ("a reasonable thought"). "We use the media as a canvas for art", explained West: "Stunts have included running a clinic for soap opera addicts and launching The Dennis Nilsen Tour Company.".

== Decima Street 1997-2000 ==
The group's name originates from the address of their first gallery space which was officially launched in February 1998 at 3 Decima Studios, Decima Street, London SE1.

The gallery was first occupied on 31 August 1997 by Guy Hilton, Philip Hunt, Alex Chappel and Matthew John Andrew. Guy Hilton left before the first show, later founding the Guy Hilton Gallery with Angela Friese in London's East End, in 2005. On 12 February 1998 the gallery was launched with a show named "Scott", which was organised by Matthew John Andrew and Philip Hunt.

In April 1998, Decima staged "Fuckart & Pimp", a hoaxed show that purported to feature a female artist producing paintings while having sex with clients.

"With delicious predictability, the Great British Public were incensed." The show was in fact a hoax.

Hunt and Andrew left in November 1998 after which, Decima was managed by Chappel and West.

On 21 August 1998, Decima sent a fax to the Tate informing them that they would be bringing a real cow to the Gallery to "show where food and sex connect with the world of art". It turned out to be the artists themselves as a pantomime cow. At this time, the artist Derrick Welsh was represented by and closely affiliated to Decima.

In April 1999, Decima attempted to cause another splash with a show entitled "Was Jesus a Homosexual?" which was organised in conjunction with political philosopher Richard Morley. The Independent's Pandora column reported that:

Gilbert and George have installed part of a 100-year-old fountain they purchased recently, which featured the inscription "Jesus said if any man thirst let him come to me and let him drink". This now reads "Jesus said let him come". Another exhibitor, Piers Wardle, has made a crucifix with wooden balls attached by a "string that can be played with" and called it The Miracle of Holy Balls. Charles Sayer's canvas of a naked woman, legs apart, is displayed alongside eight framed biblical texts and entitled Anti-Christ I awake thee. The piece de resistance is Andrew Putland's untitled triptych depicting a black Jesus and black disciples engaged in fellatio with Christ.

The exhibition also featured Swedish artist Anna Livia Löwendahl-Atomic.

When the original gallery space closed in January 2000 the name Decima continued to be used by Chappel and West for art projects.

== In limbo 2000-2007 ==
Decima steadily continued organising and participating in projects during 2000–2007, albeit far less frequently. During this time, those involved with Decima became involved with other offshoot and related projects.

In 2005, The Upstairs Gallery in Clerkenwell Green, London was opened by Chappel and Fiona Watson while the Guy Hilton Gallery was opened in Spitalfields, London, and an art and book sales website www.drugaddict.co.uk was launched by West.

== Gallery 2 in Hackney Wick ==
Decima opened an art gallery in a former peanut factory in London's Hackney Wick area on 23 February 2008 with a launch show "The Famous, The Infamous and the Really Quite Good".

In March 2008, Decima began a collaboration with local galleries Elevator and Residence and local studios to plan a local Arts Festival, called Hackney Wicked. On 8 August, The first Hackney Wicked festival went ahead.

Also during 2008, Decima launched their online project 'Decima TV' by webcasting a "chat show" in which comedian Aaron Barschak conducted a series of interviews with artists, namely the artists Bob & Roberta Smith, Franko B and Mark McGowan.

Decima are on record as sceptical about the 2012 Olympics, which is planned for the Hackney Wick area. They comment in an article by Fay Nicholson "Relational Aesthetics"

The Hackney Wick Decima Gallery space closed late 2008 - early 2009.

== Without walls, 2009 ==
Decima were criticised in January 2009 following an exhibition on Sunday 18th where they utilised images of missing three-year-old schoolgirl Madeleine McCann in a pornographic exhibition Make Your Own Maddy Porn. The exhibition was branded "appalling and completely insensitive" by the NSPCC. West and Chappel responded with a statement to the Hackney Gazette, saying that "In many ways we were just trying to highlight how Madeleine McCann's image has been used and abused by the press over the past 21 months." They added that they "never intended nor wanted to cause offence to the McCann family by doing this" but acknowledged that such an outcome was "impossible to achieve". They claimed to have been subjected to "dozens of people from Liverpool literally kicking the door in" after the gallery's details were given out on a Liverpool radio station, and the Hackney Wick gallery was closed at the end of January.

In July 2009, Decima exhibited in the Ghetto Gallery, Split, Croatia and went on to stage notable exhibitions in Kreuzberg, Berlin, Germany; Piccadilly, London and the Tate Modern, London.

As well as exhibitions, in 2009 Decima also organised various film projects, performance projects, art fairs, live music events and even a Berlin rave.

== Exhibitions and projects ==
A selection of exhibitions and projects organised by or involving Decima Gallery. Most dates are approximate: where an accurate date is shown, this refers to the launch date.

1997 and earlier

Related projects which pre-date Decima:

- 1995: The Jack Duckworth Memorial Clinic.
- 1996: A.R.T. A Reasonable Thought Zine Project.
- 1996: The Dennis Nilsen Tour Company.
- 1997: 9 August: The Live Stock Market London. Offered Pantomime Cow rides. Organised by Gavin Turk and the Factual Nonsense Trust.

1998

All 1998 events held at Decima Gallery, London SE1, UK unless otherwise stated.

- 1998: February: Scott - the inaugural show (reviewed in Time Out 25 February 1998). Curated by Matthew John Andrew and Philip Hunt.
- 1998: March: 290¼ pounds - the first solo exhibition of Matt Calderwood. Curated by Alex Chappel & Amy Plant.
- 1998: April: Fuckart & Pimp - a conceptual media hoax event by Chappel and West - launched 17 April 1998.
- 1998: 29 May: VOIDance - a performance by Gitta Wellbe. Curated by Philip Hunt.
- 1998: 29 May: Instrument - a performance by Angelica Fernando. Curated by Philip Hunt.
- 1998: 29 May: Vibrating Wall - site specific installation by Philip Hunt.
- 1998: Split - group show by St. Martins graduates. Curated by Matthew John Andrew and Philip Hunt.
- 1998: June:Lost and Found - a group show including Simon Starling. Curated by Annalise Hollis by invitation of Matthew John Andrew.
- 1998: Marginal Platform [Blue Lagoon] solo installation by Wendy Bornholdt.
- 1998: The Decima Banquet featuring the Blue Museum's Jack Diamond, Rart & Sete's penis casserole and make up artist to the stars Sharon Dowsett
- 1998: The Sofa Show - Matt Calderwood and Louise Camrass.
- 1998: Summer: Inter-gallery 5-a-side art football tournament against White Cube Gallery, Victoria Miro Gallery and others. Organised by Sam's Salon and held at Spitalfields Market, London.
- 1998: 21 August: Daisy The Pantomime Cow goes to the Tate Gallery performance outside the Tate Britain Gallery, Millbank, London.
- 1998: 31 August: The Diana Weekend
- 1998: October Framed - The Media as Canvas.
- 1998: December: Arsed - a group show by Rart and Sete, Derrick Welsh and Alison Chan.

1999

All 1999 events held at Decima Gallery, London SE1, UK unless otherwise stated.

- 1999: 12 February: Laura White - Decima Gallery.
- 1999: The Arts Club Exhibition No.2
- 1999: The Windy Nook Chip Shop at the Waygood Gallery, Newcastle upon Tyne, UK.
- 1999: Gavin Turk's Rubbish by the "Little Artists", John Cake and Darren Neave. Solo show.
- 1999: The Arts Club Exhibition featuring The Little Artists.
- 1999: April: Was Jesus a Homosexual included Gilbert & George, Piers Wardle, Rart & Sete, Jayaram Khadka and Charles Sayer.
- 1999: 8 June: The Leeds 13 Degree Show - Decima exhibited as an "artist" in this show in Leeds, doing a "Diana the Dancing Cow" performance alongside Bank, Barbara Hepworth, The Chapman Brothers, Damien Hirst, Georgina Starr, Jeff Koons, Jo Spence, Kurt Schwitters, Marcel Duchamp and Sam Taylor-Wood among others.
- 1999: July: Susan Mihalski's All-new Adoption Agency - solo show.
- 1999: August: Diana Goes to the Seaside performance at Cap d'Agde Resort, France.
- 1999: September The Time Has Come as part of the Articultural Show, South Bank, London. Featuring Piers Wardle and organised by Gavin Turk.

2000–2007

- 2000: Derrick Welsh - The F@ c@ s@ on the m@ at Bacon Street Studios, London. Organised by Alex Chappel & Lynn Wilson.
- 2001: September Maslen & Mehra - Drift, the film at 291 Gallery, Hackney, London.
- 2002: Micalefalob at 291 Gallery, Hackney, London.
- 2002: Daykinisms at Tinsy Space, Brick Lane, London.
- 2004: The Joke's on Us - Although not organised by Decima, this Show at De-luxe Arts, Hoxton Square, London, was organised by Robert Urquahart and Anna Lewis and featured a video by Alex Chappel, an installation by David C. West, a photograph by Decima and rude embroidery by Derrick Welsh.
- 2005: May: Piers & Micalef - Are You Thinking What We're Thinking? at Upstairs Gallery, Clerkenwell, London. Organised by Alex Chappel & Fiona Watson to coincide with 2005 United Kingdom general election;
- 2005: June: Dead Derrick - a Derrick Welsh retrospective at Upstairs Gallery, Clerkenwell, London.
- 2007: May: The Surrealist's Ball at the Victoria & Albert Museum, London. "Sad Fan Raffle" performance by David C. West and Stephen Micalef. Organised by Rosie Cooper.
- 2007: 30 June: The Last Puff at the Golden Heart pub, London. Exhibition to mark the last day upon which it was legal to smoke in public places in England. Included drawings of cigarettes by many notable figures and celebrities, including Jarvis Cocker, David Hockney, Sarah Lucas, Dinos Chapman, Vic Reeves and Malcolm McLaren.

2008

All 2008 events held at Decima Gallery, Hackney Wick, London E3, UK (unless otherwise stated).

- 2008: February: The Famous, the Infamous and the Really Quite Good.The opening show at Decima Gallery, Hackney Wick, London. Including Gilbert and George, Gavin Turk, and even Primrose Hill socialite Sadie Frost.
- 2008: April: Micalef for Mayor project.
- 2008: April: The Decima Easter Auction compered by actress and singer Paloma Faith.
- 2008: 17 May: Piers & Micalef - Banksy versus Barksy.
- 2008: 28 May: Shiv Mishra Solo show of the Indian artist.
- 2008: 31 May: The Decima Editions Launch & Art Fair.
- 2008: May: Decima TV presents an interview with Bob & Roberta Smith interviewer Aaron Barschak.
- 2008: May: Decima TV presents an interview with Mark McGowan interviewer Aaron Barschak
- 2008: 5 June: Mind the Step - Camberwell College Drawing MA show.
- 2008: 7 June: Decima TV presents an interview with Franko B interviewer Aaron Barschak
- 2008: Illegal Dog Fight at the Elevator Gallery, Hackney Wick, London.
- 2008: 13 June: Iceberg Enters Obelisk at the Whitechapel Gallery, London. Screening of film 'Illegal Dog Fight'.
- 2008: 21 June: The Decima Artists Show with live music by Paloma Faith.
- 2008: 19 July: The Decima Arts Club featuring Piers Jamson.
- 2008: 9 August: The Art Olympics. Featured Stephen Micalef, Piers Wardle and Stephen Gill.
- 2008: August: The Hackney Wicked Festival - co-founders and co-organisers of the first festival in 2008. Various venues around Hackney Wick.
- 2008: Summer: The Cowboy Art Fair. Organised by Geraldine Ryan. Featuring Piers Wardle, Stephen Micalef, Spiritwo and others
- 2008: Condensation 08 show curated by Robson Cesar.
- 2008: 6 September: Decima at Bestival showed with Stranger than Paradise Club at the Polka Tent, dressed as dogs, at the Bestival Festival 08, The Isle of Wight, UK.
- 2008: 13 September: Decima at Stranger than Paradise at Dex Club, Brixton, London. Dog Dancing performance.
- 2008: 8 November: Decima at "A Night of Hackney Adventures" at the Round Chapel, Clapton, London. Organised by Stephen Gill.
- 2008: 4 December: Decima TV presents Byron Pritchard v East End Lights filmed at Beyond Retro, London
- 2008: 13 December: The Decima Christmas Art Fair & Nativity Play Organised by Kate Kotcheff, daughter of Ted Kotcheff. Art fair featured Carlo Zenone.

2009

- 2009: 18 January: An Afternoon of Hardcore Porn project. Held in Clapton, London.
- 2009: 24 January: Micalef for Poet Laureate project, launched at Pages of Hackney bookshop, Clapton, London.
- 2009: 17 April: Decima on Resonance FM radio broadcast, London.
- 2009: 23 May: Decima Charity Fundraising Ball held at McGinity Hall, Hackney, London.
- 2009: June: The Art Car Boot Fair at Brick Lane, London. Dressed as dogs.
- 2009: 24 July: It's All Over Banksy Mark Reeves and the Decima Dogs at Ghetto Gallery, Split, Croatia.
- 2009: 1 August: Come Back Decima, all is forgiven as part of the Hackney Wicked Festival, Hackney Wick, London.
- 2009: 11 September: Britain's Rubbish Fundraiser live event held at the George Tavern, Whitechapel, London, in association with La Bouche Magazine. Featuring Tymon Dogg, The Coolness, The Fucks, Stephen Gill, Simon Ould, Mark McGowan, Paul Sakoilsky, Nova, Tricity Vogue, Stephen Micalef, Piers Wardle, Mark Reeves, cApStAn StRiNg, Vicki Gold & David C West.
- 2009: October: Asphalt Handbag, a rave in Berlin. Co-organised by Private Lives
- 2009: 30 October: Britain's Rubbish at Molecular Studio, Berlin, Germany. Featuring over 50 artists including Gilbert & George, Featherhouse, Piers Wardle, Darren Coffield and Gavin Turk. Joy Collie. Co-organised by Molecular Studio.
- 2009: 21 November: We're Dreamin' of a Rubbish Xmas! live music event held at the George Tavern, Whitechapel, London, in association with La Bouche Magazine. Acts included Beastellabeast, Nova, Douce Angoisse and The Annual Decima Nativity Play, in its second year, again directed by Kate Kotcheff.
- 2009: November: Xmas Rubbish art fair event, London.
- 2009: 19 December: Smash & Grab - Louise Camrass & Nelly Dimitranova - opening event at 97 Clerkenwell Road, Camden, London. Assisted by Camden Council.
- 2009: 12 & 13 December: The Decima Turnip Prize at the Tate Modern Gallery, as part of Rob Pruitt's Flea Market, itself part of the exhibition "Pop Life: Art in a Material World".
- 2009: 4 December: What Happens After the Ball? at Decima Clark West, Piccadilly, London. Organised by Decima, Nomad Galleries and Jackie Clark.

2010

- 2010: 7 January: Pop Up - Louise Camrass & Nelly Dimitranova - closing event at 97 Clerkenwell Road, Camden, London. Assisted by Camden Council

== See also ==
Artists, individuals and organisations Decima work with or have worked with, and other related articles:

Adam Dant • Art of the United Kingdom • Contemporary art • David Shayler • Gary Hart • Harry Pye • Little Artists • Louise Camrass • Mark McGowan • Matt Calderwood • Micalef • Neil Zakiewicz • Paloma Faith • Piers Wardle • Sadie Frost • Simon Starling • Stephen Gill (photographer) • Tymon Dogg • Vic Reeves • Young British Artists • Quilla Constance
