= Piers Wardle =

British artist (1960–2009)

Christopher Piers Arthur Wardle (20 April 1960 – 22 December 2009) was a British artist, musician and art factotum. Born in Beckenham, he lived in Southwark, London, UK and died in Clyst Hydon, Devon, UK.

Piers Wardle had a longstanding interest in fractal patterns and found objects, especially sweet packaging

== Biography ==
After Exeter School where he illustrated the school magazine, designed stage sets for productions and painted a mural of a crow (inspired by Ted Hughes) on the sixth form common room wall, and Exeter College of Art and Design (1978–79), he went to Oxford's Ruskin School of Drawing (1979–82), where his friends included the artists William Latham, Adam Lowe, and Helen Elwes. There too he met the poet Stephen Micalef who was at the other Ruskin College. He was member of St Edmund Hall, Oxford.

Wardle was perhaps the first British painter to experiment artistically with the ideas of Benoit Mandelbrot and other 'chaos' mathematicians, exploring in his work how 'the complexity associated with natural and organic forms can be generated, in appearance at least, by simple rules' (from Piers Wardle's catalogue for an exhibition held at the Pomeroy Purdy Gallery in April 1989). An interest in chaos and fractals is present throughout Wardle's work as is a love of found objects especially sweet wrappers, packaging and signage. He would go on to explore the artistic potential of computer-generated chaotic patterns.

He was the great-grandson of the painter Arthur Wardle. He participated in numerous one man shows and group exhibitions of painting and conceptual art. Initially represented by Purdy Hicks, later Wardle moved to Joshua Compston's Factual Nonsense Gallery. Wardle also contributed a print to Compston's limited edition book Other Men's Flowers. He subsequently exhibited at, amongst others, the Decima Gallery and the Courtauld Institute, and for thirty years collaborated with Stephen Micalef, providing piano accompaniment to the latter's poetry. In addition they produced works on paper; Wardle as Micalef's illustrator.

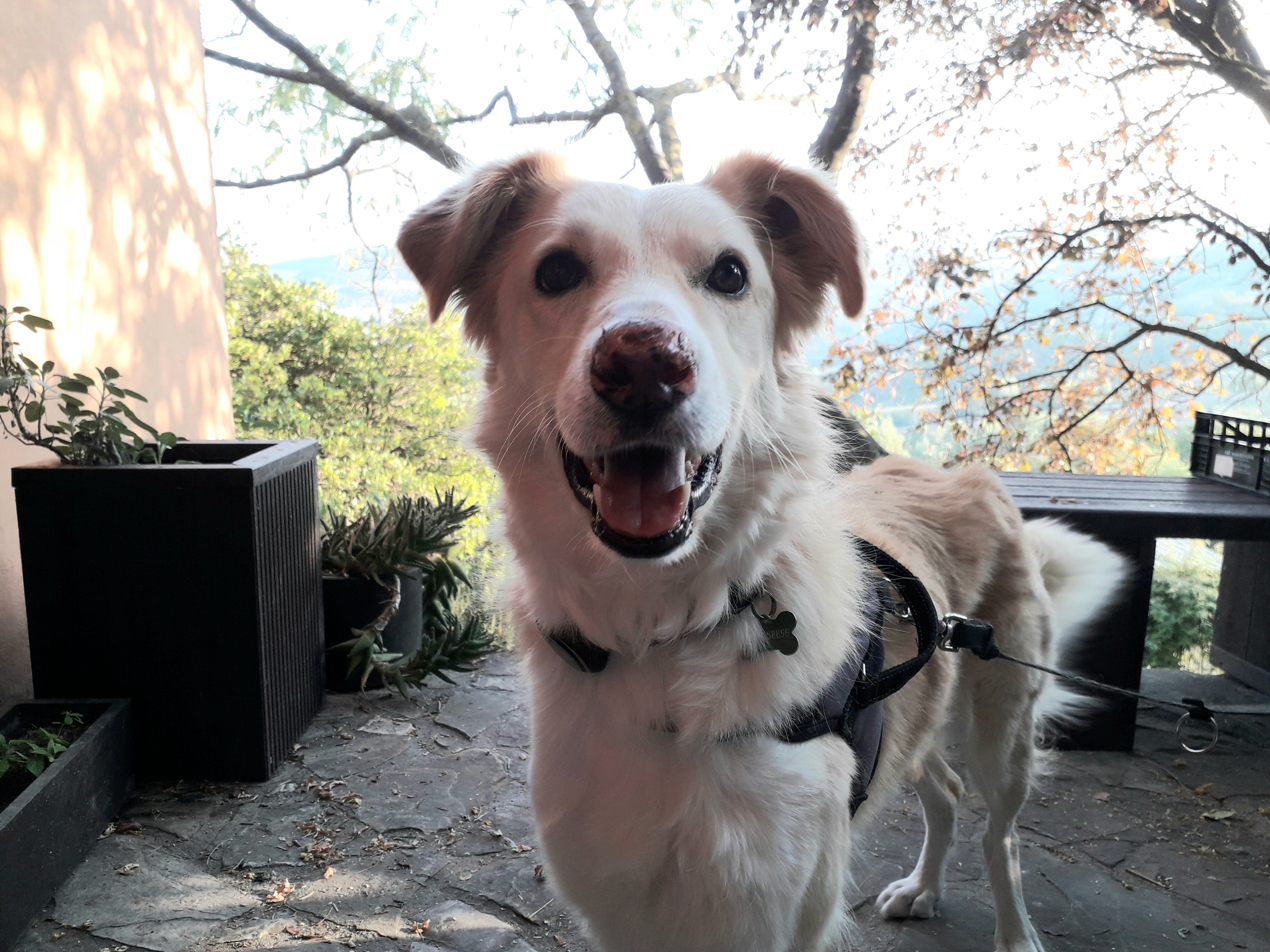
Wardle scanned this painting and installed a copy in its original home in Venice, 2009

Wardle also worked as a picture editor for the Redstone Diary. Recent more formal activities included 'printing' concrete for Anish Kapoor, fixing a Marc Quinn, analysing Caravaggio's brush work in Rome, and scanning both Tutankhamun's tomb and Paolo Veronese's Marriage at Cana, (all of which arranged by Factum Arte).

== Solo exhibitions ==
A random selection of either solo shows, or solo collaborations with Steve Micalef.

- 1992: 17 July - 8 August, Piers Wardle - Paintings and Installations, at Pomeroy Purdy Gallery, Jacob Street film studios, Mill Street, London, SE1 2BA. (Pomeroy Purdy was the origin of what in 2010 is the Purdy Hicks Gallery, of Bankside, London).
- 1999: 3–10 May: Nine Planets in alignment, by Micalef, Piers Wardle and Michael Daykin, for the Attaché Gallery. Launched at the Pride of Spitalfields, Heneage Street, E.C. on 3 May;
- 2005: March: Piers Wardle & Stephen Micalef at Guy Hilton Gallery, Commercial Street, London. Organized by Guy Hilton;
- 2005: May: Piers & Micalef - Are You Thinking What We're Thinking? at Upstairs Gallery, Clerkenwell, London. Organised by Alex Chappel & Fiona Watson to coincide with 2005 United Kingdom general election;
- 2008: May: Piers & Micalef - Banksy versus Barksy at Decima Gallery, Hackney Wick, London. Organised by Decima.

== Group exhibitions ==
A random selection of group exhibitions in which Piers participated:

Computer generated artwork by Piers Wardle

- 1981: ACME;
- 1982: Museum of Modern Art, Oxford (MOMO);
- 1990: Eastbourne Clark Gallery, Florida;
- 1991, from 27 November 1991-, Courtauld Loan Collection (East Wing I), inaugurated and curated by Joshua Compston. His work, untitled, from the collection of Jeremy Fry, was one of the 16 exhibited. Fry and the Duchess of Westminster provided much of the sponsorship while the other artists included Gilbert & George, Gary Hume, Damien Hirst, Howard Hodgkin and Darren Coffield.
- 1991-92: John Moores' exhibition in Liverpool. He described the work sent there as ' think Mitchelson-Morley '.
- sometime at Bernhard Baron gallery;
- 1993: March: Es la Manera! (Potential Ideals c1845-2000+) (Translated as: Is The Way) at Factual Nonsense, Shoreditch, London. Organized by Joshua Compston.
- 1993: June: S.S. Excess - from Mary Magdalen to John the Baptist at Factual Nonsense, Shoreditch, London. Organized by Joshua Compston.
- 1993: November: Hardcore at Factual Nonsense, Shoreditch, London. Organized by Joshua Compston. Alongside artists Gary Hume, Andrew Capstick, Fiona Rae, David Taborn, Darren Coffield, Rebecca Bower, Dan Asher & David J. Smith.
- 1995: July: The Hanging Picnic, at Hoxton Square, Shoreditch, London. Organized by Joshua Compston.
- 1998: April: Was Jesus a Homosexual? at Decima Gallery, SE1, London.
- 1998: The Windy Nook Chip Shop at the Waygood Gallery, Newcastle upon Tyne, UK. Organised by Derrick Welsh & Decima as part of Visual Arts North East 98 (VANE98).
- 1999: September The Time Has Come as part of the Articultural Show, South Bank, London. Organised by Gavin Turk.
- 2000: March: n01se, Kettle's Yard, Cambridge. Organized by artist Adam Lowe and historian of science Simon Schaffer.
- 2008: February: The Famous, the Infamous and the Really Quite Good. at Decima Gallery, Hackney Wick, London.
- 2008: Summer: The Cowboy Art Fair at Decima Gallery, Hackney Wick, London. Organised by Geraldine Ryan.
- 2008: August: The Art Olympics at Decima Gallery, Hackney Wick, London.
- 2009: October: Britain's Rubbish at Molecular Studio, Berlin, Germany. Organised by Decima & Molecular Studio.
- 2009: December: What Happens After the Ball? at Decima Clark West, Piccadilly, London. Organised by Decima, Nomad Galleries and Jackie Clark. Wardle exhibited two pieces in this show - one piece by 'Piers & Micalef' and one piece by Piers Wardle.
