= Domobaal =

Art gallery in London

Coordinates: 51.5126°N 0.1148°W

domobaal is a contemporary art gallery in John Street in Bloomsbury Bloomsbury, Holborn in central London. It was established in 2000 in a former head office of a firm of lawyers, left largely unrestored. The gallery exhibits new work across all media, including painting, sculpture, film and artists publications, having hosted over 260 exhibitions by artists including Ansel Krut, Lothar Götz, Neil Zakiewicz, Alex Rich, Mikey Cuddihy, Dermot O'Brien, Kristaps Ancāns, David Gates, Neil Gall, Stuart Brisley, Sharon Kivland, Nicky Hirst, Haris Epaminonda, Marcel Dinahet, Maud Cotter, Alice Wilson, Emma Talbot, Ailbhe Ní Bhriain and Walter Swennen among many others. In summer 2023 the gallery also presented an extensive Graham Growley exhibition.
