= Maud Cotter =

Irish artist

- Born: 1954 (age 71–72); Wexford, Ireland
- Education: Crawford Municipal College of Art and Design
- Known for: sculpture
- Spouse: Peter Foynes
- Elected: Aosdána (2000)
- Website: maudcotter.com

Maud Cotter (born 1954) is an Irish artist. She is a member of Aosdána, an Irish association of artists.

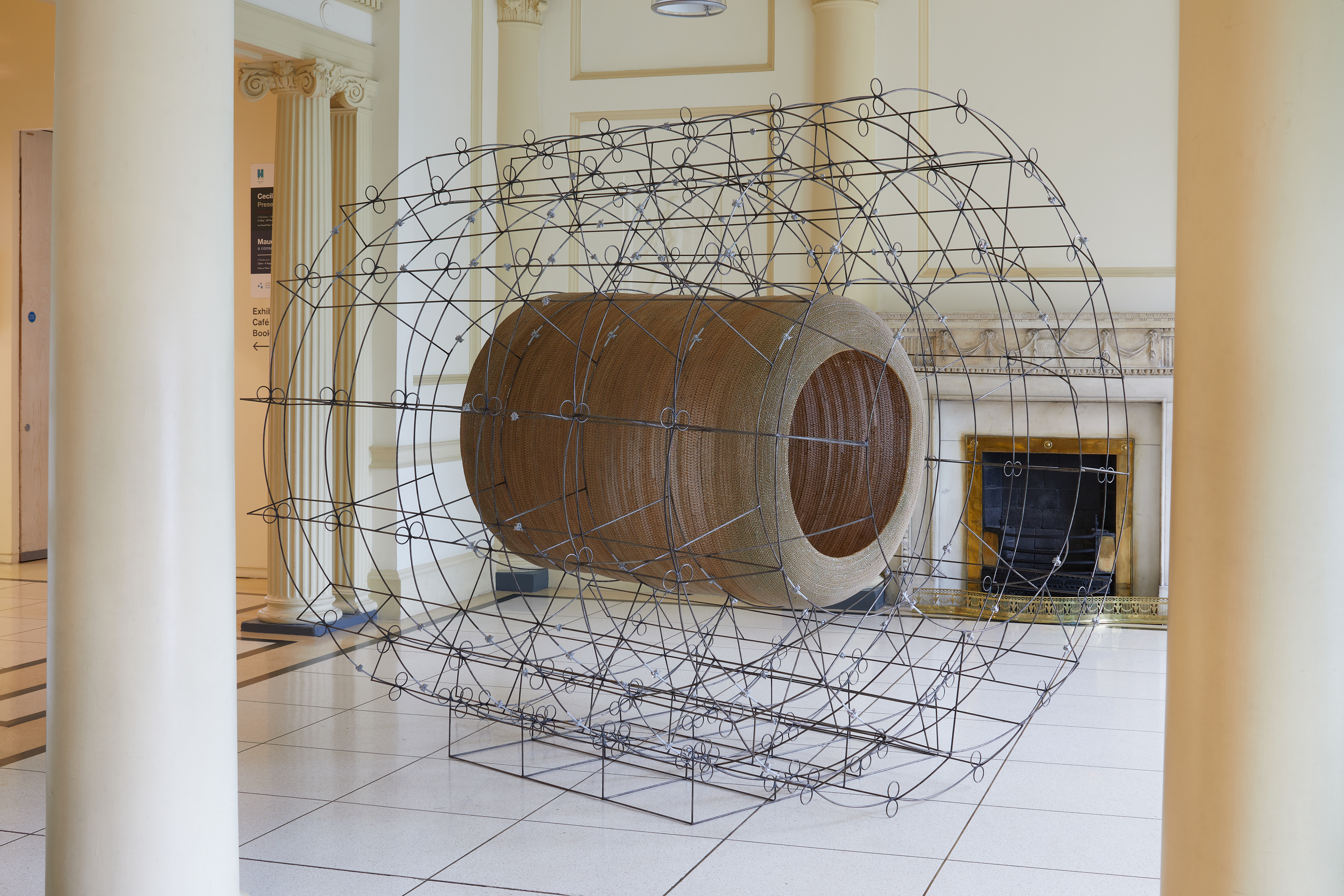

== Early life ==
Cotter was born in Wexford in 1954.

== Career ==
Cotter studied at the Crawford Municipal College of Art and Design in Cork (graduating in 1978). In 1989 she was a co-founder of the National Sculpture Factory, with Vivienne Roche, Eilis O'Connell and Danny McCarthy.. She was elected to Aosdána in 2000.

Cotter is chiefly known for her work in sculpture. Public galleries who have held solo exhibitions of her work, include: Crawford Art Gallery, Mostyn, Irish Museum of Modern Art, Hugh Lane Gallery, Irish Arts Center, Highlanes Gallery, MOCA Jacksonville..

Her early work used steel. Since the early 1990s she has used metal, timber, glass, cardboard, industrial rubber, wax, clear plastic, paper and other materials, saying that these materials help her "explore issues of definitions and boundaries, containment and space". Her practice is represented by domobaal gallery in London.

== Personal life ==
Cotter is married to Peter Foynes.
