= Little Artists =

Hirst's Shark Tank by the Little Artists

The Little Artists are John Cake and Darren Neave. They create versions of well known contemporary artworks and art personalities in miniature using toy Lego bricks. They also produce a range of merchandise. They describe themselves as conceptual artists. Their work can be described as made sculpture art hall. Their work is collected by Charles Saatchi.

== Career and art ==
They studied Fine Art at Leeds University. They have been collecting Lego for over 20 years, and started from when they were children. They buy all the new sets that are produced and also buy off the internet. A figure of Salvador Dalí, for example, was made by combining the Harry Potter set with the standard "woman's hair" and a conquistador's face from an old pirate set. They started seriously making the Lego pieces in 2003, but their first attempt was earlier:

We'd made Damien Hirst's shark tank as students because we were very bored and we wanted to be on a par with someone as great as Damien Hirst who's done so much. We just feel like the owners of a contemporary art gallery now, with our Hirst, Koons and Dalí.

Their first show in a public gallery was Art Craziest Nation (named after Matthew Collings' book, Art Crazy Nation) at the Walker Art Gallery in Liverpool from August 2005 for five months. The artists created an art show in miniature. Titles of the works shown (all made from Lego) included Hirst's Shark Tank, Warhol's Money, Andre's Bricks, Craig-Martin's Tree, Beuys' Sleighs, Emin's Bed and Chapmans' Dead Guys. Some pieces are now on display as part of the Gallery's permanent collection.

Their work includes "Lick Your Selves", edible frozen versions of Marc Quinn's Self sculpture. This was on show in Brighton in 2006 and Sheffield Blocspace 2005.

The Little Artists play Pictionary for a charity fund-raising show staged by them

In November 2005 they staged a show called Contemporary Artists Play Pictionary at the Agency Contemporary Gallery in London. They described this as "part-installation, part-performance, part-curatorial". Over 50 artists took part in a round of Pictionary, a game where a word has to be communicated in a drawing. The drawings were signed and then auctioned to benefit the National Autistic Society. Participating artists included Tracey Emin, Billy Childish, Gavin Turk, Mark Wallinger, Charles Thomson, Georgina Starr and Mark Quinn.

They are currently using Smurfs, Martin Kippenberger and Batman as reference points in new work.

The Little Artists work from a studio in London. Their studio is known as "The Red Studio" after the painting by Matisse.

== See also ==
- Damien Hirst
- An Oak Tree
