= Ivan Massow =

British campaigner and media personality

- Born: Ivan Field; 11 September 1967 (age 59); Brighton, East Sussex
- Occupation: Entrepreneur
- Years active: 1990–present

Ivan Julian Massow (born 11 September 1967) is a British financial services entrepreneur, gay rights campaigner, and media personality. He is also a former chairman of the Institute of Contemporary Arts in London. He has been active in UK politics, formerly as a member of the Conservative Party and since 2016 in the Liberal Democrats.

He is Master of the Southdown and Eridge Hunt.

== Early life ==
Massow was born Ivan Field in Brighton, East Sussex. His relationships with his father and subsequently his stepfather were poor; as a boy he ended up being cared for by social services, before being adopted as a pre-teenager by John Massow. Commenting on his life prior to his adoption, Massow has stated that "My life up to then is a bit of a blur. I had four different families, my name changed from Field to Mitchell to Massow, I was moved around for various reasons."

Massow is dyslexic and left school at 16 with one O-level in metalwork, with possibly others in photography and history; however, information regarding his early qualifications is ambiguous, and Massow himself has commented that "I lied about them so much, I can't remember what's actually true." He studied at Eastbourne for a BTEC in art and design, then moved to Bristol and was employed by an insurance firm. (Note: Sources are divided over which insurance firm Massow worked in, either Friends Provident or National Provident) In 1990 Massow moved to London and started his own financial services business.

== Business career ==
=== Massow Financial Services ===
In 1990 and with less than £5,000 Massow started Bowater Massow, later to become Massow Financial Services Ltd, running it initially from a squat in Kentish Town, London, using just a mobile phone. Massow specialised in offering financial services to gay people, in particular sourcing competitively priced insurance and mortgages for customers whose sexuality previously resulted in their being charged much higher premiums.

Massow's company soon attracted customers and expanded; the success and high profile of the business resulted in Massow being voted Man of the Year by the Pink Paper in 1996, and by 1997 Massow had become a multi-millionaire. At the end of the decade his company had several offices, including branches in Edinburgh, Manchester and Liverpool, and was at the forefront of the 'gay finance' sector.

At the end of 2000 Massow merged his company with another gay-orientated finance company, Rainbow Finance of Oxford, thereby creating Rainbow Massow, one of the largest independent financial advice firms in the UK. Massow took the role of chairman while Louis Letourneau, who had run Rainbow Finance, became managing director. The market value of the new company was £20 million, and Massow predicted that turnover would rise from £2 million per annum to over £3.5 million. However, within one year the firm ran out of money and was placed in receivership. Both Massow and Letourneau blamed each other for the firm's demise. Massow bought the company back from the receiver for about £1.5 million and subsequently re-established it.

=== Jake ===
In 2001 Massow set up Jake, an online social networking site for gay professionals.

=== Allied Dunbar and Zurich ===
Between 2003 and 2004 Massow was director of another financial adviser firm, this time a tied agent of the Zurich Advice Network (previously Allied Dunbar). Massow had previously campaigned against what he saw as Allied Dunbar's anti-gay underwriting practices, but he claimed that "they've moved on and, for the sake of my customers, so must I [...] if other gay financial advisers think they're doing the best for their customers by blackballing all the companies that were once out of line (there were about eight of them) when it came to gay issues – then their priorities are very strange. Financial advice is about getting the best product – not petty grudge bearing." Massow accepted a transitional loan of £330,000 to enable office relocation and staff training. However the arrangement was short-lived and ironically ended after a dispute between Massow and Zurich over Zurich's approach to insuring the gay clients in which the firm specialised. A long £13 million legal case followed which was settled out of court.

=== Pay Me My ===
In September 2011 Massow set up Pay Me My, a trading name of Massows Limited, which offered customers a rebate of 80% of the 'trail' commission paid to their existing advisers if the customer switched their insurance, pension and investment policies to the agency of Pay Me My, who would take 20% as their fee. Massow defended the business model of the firm from suggestions that it would not be viable following changes to financial regulation in the UK due to start on 1 January 2013; however, it ceased trading in August 2013 when the government banned commission rendering its services obsolete. The firm informed its clients that, should they choose to remain with the company, all future trail commissions would be retained and not rebated. This action was unpopular with customers, therefore Massow agreed to sell the remaining assets under management to Clubfinance, who would continue rebating the majority of their commission.

=== Others ===
Other Massow businesses include Halos and Horns and Massows Angels.

== Contemporary art ==
In 1999, Massow became Chairman of the Institute of Contemporary Arts in London. He was brought in by Director Philip Dodd to increase sponsorship and patronage for the organisation. Dodd claimed that Massow was a "mass of contradictions, just like the ICA. He's a risky choice for us, but the ICA should always live dangerously." However the working relationship between Massow and Dodd subsequently proved to be not wholly successful, as Dodd increasingly disliked Massow's knack for self-promotion and perceived him to be taking over the role of being the organisation's public face.

The situation deteriorated irreparably when in January 2002 Massow wrote an article in New Statesman magazine, attacking the predominance of conceptual art in the art world. He described modern concept art as "pretentious, self-indulgent, craftless tat" and "the product of over-indulged, middle-class [...], bloated egos who patronise real people with fake understanding". He called the ICA a "pillar of the shock establishment". He attacked Tracey Emin saying she "couldn't think her way out of a paper bag", though he admitted this comment was "a little below the belt".

In February 2002, Massow resigned as Chairman of the ICA, after the board unanimously requested him to. Board member Ekow Eshun was quoted in The Guardian as saying "I have no problem with Ivan bringing up this debate. But Ivan has been ramping up the story all week. I think he's been a little bit of a pillock." There was speculation that Massow had deliberately been as provocative as possible to engineer his own sacking. Massow claims he spoke out to redress the imbalance between the promotion of conceptual and more traditional art in the British art scene.

His views have engendered strong feelings about him amongst the art world; a year after his resignation one artist commented that "they treat him like the Black Death round here", although Massow has received less vocal support from many artists who fear they will never achieve recognition unless they follow the conceptual route.

Massow collects figurative contemporary art and claims that he visits art colleges and artists' studios regularly. In a 2003 interview he stated that "I visit at least one a week, quietly, on my own. It helps to see how people work. How they define themselves. I rarely buy from galleries." Massow has had his portrait painted nearly 30 times, including a double nude diptych by Jonathan Yeo, son of Conservative MP Tim Yeo, and a portrait by Darren Coffield of Massow in full foxhunting attire, which was exhibited at the National Portrait Gallery. Massow has personally provided regular financial support for some artists, to assist them in their lives and work.

== Politics ==
Massow was first attracted to the politics of the Conservative Party when he was a boy. He joined his local Young Conservatives and at age 14 became its chairman, the youngest in the country at the time.

In the 1990s Massow's flatmates were for a time former Conservative Secretary of State for Education Michael Gove, and MP and former head of Conservative policy Nicholas Boles, a situation Massow described as "Tory Friends".

However Massow, along with many espousing "compassionate conservatism", was frustrated by the Party's apparent reluctance to alter its stance on gay rights issues and discrimination in general. In 2000, following John Bercow MP's resignation from the front bench and the defection of Shaun Woodward MP to Labour, Massow too left the Conservative Party to join the Labour Party, where he was welcomed by Mo Mowlam. However Massow later returned to the Conservatives, subsequently claiming that the brief defection to Labour had a particular motivation: "I knew if I switched it would be front page news. I thought it would help the party focus on repealing Section 28. I had one meeting with Labour, that's all. I never wanted to be a candidate."

Massow is pro-hunting and in 2003 was depicted in full hunting gear in a portrait by Darren Coffield, exhibited at the National Portrait gallery.

Massow became head of the Conservative Technology Initiative for London in 2012.

In February 2013, Massow was rejected as a parliamentary candidate for Somerton and Frome, in favour of David Warburton who was selected.

In November 2014, he became the first Conservative to declare their plan to seek the Conservative Party's candidacy to become Mayor of London at the 2016 elections. He was unsuccessful in his candidacy.

He joined the Liberal Democrats in September 2016, in protest at the Conservative Party's post-Brexit vote stance.

== Media ==
In November 2005, Massow was the winning mentor on Channel 4's Make Me a Million.

Massow produced the film Banksy's Coming For Dinner, starring Joan Collins.

In 2013 Massow was a significant part of Derren Brown's The Great Art Robbery for Channel 4, in which Brown taught a group of old age pensioners how to get away with a robbery using various techniques such as how to stay unnoticed as well as controlling fear and nerves. The OAPs then embarked on a large-scale robbery, which involved stealing an expensive painting from Massow. The show first aired on 13 December 2013.

In 2016 Massow featured in the Channel 4 documentary "Rich Brother, Poor Brother" along with his estranged younger brother David. The documentary contrasted Ivan's millionaire London lifestyle with that of David, a bohemian labourer who lives in a converted truck near Glastonbury.

== Charity work ==
Massow Financial Services was the first mainstream business to sponsor London's Gay Pride in 1990 which it continued to do in subsequent years.

Massow has raised funds for charity and founded the April Bombing Appeal for victims of the April 1999 nail-bombings in Soho, Brixton and Brick Lane in London. Massow Financial Services collected donations for the appeal.

In March 2010, in partnership with Oxfam and Beat That Quote, Massow developed Compare for Good, a charity fundraising price comparison website which promised to pay more than two-thirds of the money raised by the site to Oxfam. In March 2011 Beat That Quote was sold to Google.

== Personal life ==
Massow is gay. He lives in Hoxton, in London's East End and enjoys horse riding and foxhunting.

In the aftermath of the Zurich case, Massow moved to Spain. He began to drink heavily and became an alcoholic. However he has not drunk since 2008 and chaired an Alcoholics Anonymous group in Soho.

In 2010 Massow developed an aneurysm and became seriously ill. He required urgent hospital treatment, including at one point having to be operated on without anaesthetic, which saved his life. Massow subsequently described the experience as uplifting, stating that "The prospect of dying wasn't frightening, as I'd thought, but calm and full of relief. And instead of thinking about a tomorrow that wouldn't come, I looked over my past 'life' and was actually quite proud and happy I'd acquitted myself OK. There was nothing to be ashamed of."
