= Campsfield House Immigration Removal Centre =

United Kingdom immigration detention centre

Coordinates: 51°49′33″N 01°18′39″W

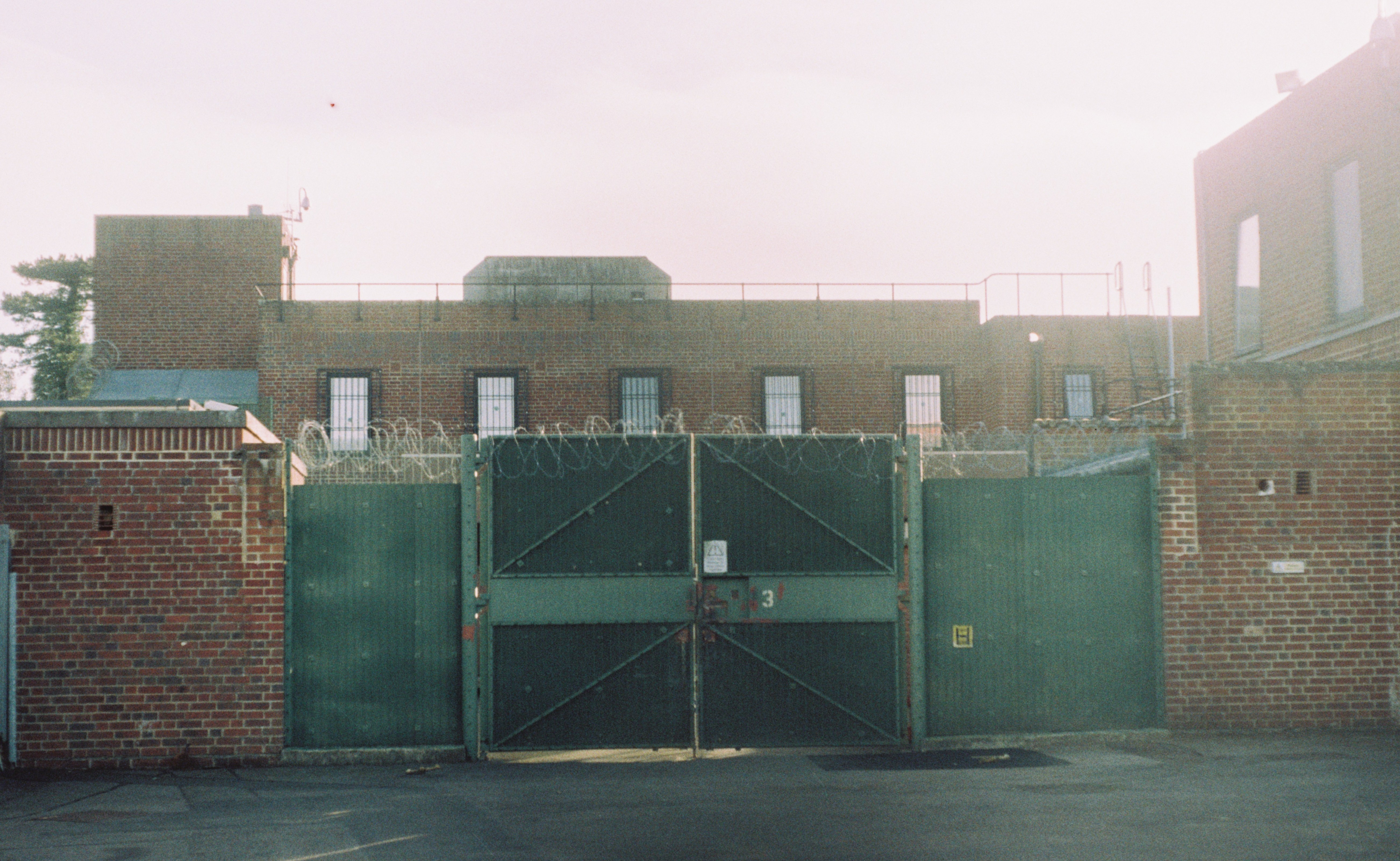
Campsfield House

Campsfield House is an immigration detention centre located in Kidlington near Oxford, England, operated by private prison firm Mitie under contract with the British government. For 25 years, it was the site of a regular monthly protest from human rights campaigners and saw a number of internal protests, hunger strikes and two suicides. However, it was highly praised by the Chief Inspector of Prisons at the last full inspection in 2014. Campsfield was closed in 2018, until 2025.

On 28 June 2022, the Home Office announced plans for a new immigration removal centre to be developed on the site of the former Campsfield House IRC. On 16 July 2022, the Coalition to Keep Campsfield Closed was launched with a rally in Oxford’s Bonn Square.

On 1 December 2025, Campsfield Immigration Removal Centre was reopened, following completion of Phase 1 construction, providing 160 bed spaces for detained men in refurbished accommodation (compared to 282 in the former Campsfield IRC, closed in 2018.) The first detainees arrived at the Immigration Removal Centre on 3 December 2025.

== History ==
Campsfield House used to be a youth detention centre, but it re-opened as an Immigration Detention Centre in November 1993. It originally had 200 places for both male and female prisoners, however in 1997, capacity was reduced to 184 and the prison became male only. The capacity rose to 282 bed spaces in 2017. Over 3600 people passed through the centre in 2017, with an average stay of 39 days.

Although the detainee population initially consisted of asylum seekers, from June 2006 government policy saw the population change to mainly (an average of 80%) former HMP prisoners detained on immigration grounds.

Until 2011, Campsfield was run by the American private prison company GEO Group. Campsfield House was their first European contract. In 2011 operations at the facility were turned over to Mitie Group PLC. Mitie's contract for Campsfield House expired in June 2019. Mitie was given a new contract to run Campsfield House IRC in 2025.

== Conditions ==
Detainees at Campsfield House were held behind a 20-foot-high (6.1 m) razor wire–topped fence. Throughout the centre there were surveillance cameras, and friends and relatives wishing to visit detainees were searched before passing through five separate remote-controlled doors. Detainees were allowed the use of mobile phones. Security of the centre was maintained by large perimeter fences, but within the establishment detainees were relatively free to roam. As opposed to cells, detainees had two or three man rooms and communal shower and toilet facilities. There were around fifteen single rooms. The doors to rooms were never locked, however the gates to the three accommodation blocks were locked between midnight and six in the morning. Detainees were free to move around the blocks during this time. This relatively relaxed regime, coupled with the new influx of ex-HMP prisoners led to difficulty in maintaining discipline at Campsfield.

== Inspection ==
Like all Immigration Removal Centres, Campsfield House was regularly inspected by HM Chief Inspector of Prisons. The last full inspection was in 2014. The Chief Inspector reported: 'This was the latest in a sequence of positive reports about the centre, all of which have found consistent improvement.... Overall, this was a very positive inspection. Staff and managers at Campsfield House should be congratulated in dealing professionally and sensitively with detainees”.

== Controversy ==
=== Hunger strikes ===
On 22 June 2005, a group of six Zimbabwean asylum seekers went on hunger strike for three days.

In August 2008, 13 Iraqi Kurds went on hunger strike and were joined by a number of others.

On 3 August 2010, over 100 detainees went on hunger strike in protest at being held for up to three years with "no prospect of removal or any evidence of future release".

=== Suicides ===
On 27 June 2005, Campsfield detainee Ramazan Komluca died by suicide. The 19-year-old from Turkey had been detained for about 6 months, and had made three unsuccessful bail applications.

In August 2011, Ianos Dragutan, a 35-year-old Moldovan man, took his own life by hanging himself in a shower cubicle at Campsfield. Liz Peretz, on behalf of the Campaign to Close Campsfield, expressed deep concern over this incident, saying “This young man’s suicide must immediately raise serious questions about health and safety inside Campsfield, especially the adequacy of health and welfare provision.”

=== Fires and disturbances ===
In March 2007, there was a riot at the centre after staff used force to remove a detainee from his room.

On 14 June 2008, a series of small fires broke out at the centre. 10 fire engines, 12 police vehicles and a police helicopter were dispatched to the centre, and a police cordon set up, at the request of the UK Border Agency, to secure the perimeter which was not believed to have been breached.

On 18 October 2013, the centre was damaged by fire. A detainee, Farid Pardiaz, was convicted of arson at Oxford Crown Court and was jailed for 32 months.

== Opposition to Campsfield House ==
The initial establishment of an immigration detention centre at Campsfield House was opposed by the local parish council, however they were overruled by the Home Office. The Campaign to Close Campsfield held monthly demonstrations outside the premises, using the slogan 'Asylum seekers are not criminals'. They also published the Campsfield Monitor which gave detainees accounts of what is happening inside the centre.

In the 2010 General Election, Aaron Barschak ran as an independent candidate in the Witney constituency against David Cameron to highlight the plight of asylum seekers and the treatment of people in Campsfield House. At the count he wore a sign around his neck which read "Close Campsfield House". He won 53 votes.

Plans to expand Campsfield in 2014-15 were withdrawn in March 2015 following broad opposition from the public and the sitting Conservative MP, Nicola Blackwood, who argued that the number of detainees would be too large, problems would arise from having two different buildings on one site, and the proposal didn't warrant building on green belt land.

== Closure and proposed reopening ==
=== Campsfield closed ===
Campsfield House IRC was operational from November 1993 to May 2019.

The Home Office announced the closure of Campsfield House in November 2018 as part of a policy to reduce the use of immigration detention. The government committed to 'reduce the number of those detained, and the duration of detention before removal,' and to pursue alternatives to detention, in response to the findings of an independent report into immigration detention conducted by Stephen Shaw. Three other detention centres were closed in the same period.

=== Proposal to reopen Campsfield ===
On 14 April 2022, Boris Johnson announced the Government's plans to expand immigration detention facilities again. The Home Office confirmed this change in detention policy, expressing its intention to 'keep as many people in detention as the law allows.' As part of the movement towards increasing the use of detention, the Home Office announced on 28 June 2022 that it was planning to expand, refurbish and reopen Campsfield House IRC.

The Home Office has stated that 'This new IRC will be a mixture of refurbished and new-build accommodation and will provide safe, secure and fit for purpose accommodation for people in detention.' Before it closed, Campsfield House had a capacity for 282 adults. The expanded site would have the capacity to detain around 400 men. These would be a mixture of 'time-served foreign national offenders' and 'immigration offenders'.

The Home Office originally said the site would open in late 2023 at the earliest but as of December 2023, no planning application has been submitted.

=== Local reaction and opposition ===
In July 2022, shortly after the government's plans were announced, a motion was tabled at Cherwell District Council opposing the reopening of Campsfield. 20 councillors voted to oppose the measure, with 18 in favour. One councillor abstained.

Oxford City Council and Oxfordshire County Council have publicly opposed the reopening of Campsfield. Local voluntary, political and student groups are speaking out against the reopening under the banner of the Coalition to Keep Campsfield Closed.

On Saturday 25 November 2023, over 50 people from around the county protested at the Langford Lane entrance to the disused immigration detention centre. They listened to speeches and messages from representatives of student, anti-racist, religious, and medical organisations, local charities, trade unions, and local councillors. The demonstration was called by the Coalition to Keep Campsfield Closed and Oxford Student Action for Refugees.

A Change.org petition, created by Allan, a former Campsfield detainee, with the support of the Coalition, has now gathered over 1,000 signatures (as of December 2023). An Early Day Motion against the reopening (tabled by Layla Moran MP) has been signed by 33 parliamentarians.
