= Clubfinance =

UK financial services company

Clubfinance Ltd
- Type: Limited company
- Industry: Financial services
- Founded: 2002 in Hemel Hempstead
- Headquarters: Bristol, UK
- Area served: United Kingdom
- Key people: Alex Davies (Chief Executive); David Scrivens (cofounder); Philip Rhoden (cofounder)
- Products: ISAs, OEICs, Unit trusts, Shares, Pensions
- Services: Stockbroker; Electronic trading platform
- Owner: Wealth Club Ltd
- Website: www.clubfinance.co.uk

Clubfinance is a financial services company headquartered in Bristol, UK. The firm acts as intermediary for a number of different fund and share dealing platforms. It previously arranged tax efficient investments such as venture capital trusts and Enterprise Investment Schemes for private investors on a non-advised basis.

In January 2018 the company was acquired by Wealth Club, a Bristol-based specialist broker of tax-efficient investments.

== History ==
Clubfinance was founded in 2002 by David Scrivens and Philip Rhoden, who ran the company from David's spare bedroom until the company moved into offices in 2005. Clubfinance diversified into providing financial modelling services until the modelling services were demerged into a separate company, Clubfinance Project Finance, in May 2012. In July 2012 the company launched its share dealing platform in conjunction with stockbroker James Brearley, targeted at investors that traded shares more than once a month.

After talks with competitor Intelligent Money in late 2012, Clubfinance was able to buy its direct to consumer client book, including assets under management of around £100m. In 2013 it also acquired the client book of Ivan Massow's Paymemy.com business, which was experiencing financial difficulty. Following the Retail Distribution Review, the company changed the charging structure of its share dealing service, making its annual percentage fee lower but the charge per trade higher.

=== Acquisition by Wealth Club ===
The company was acquired by Wealth Club Ltd on 9 January 2018. It operates as a fully owned subsidiary offering fund and share platforms, with the tax-efficient investment offering now consolidated under Wealth Club.
