= An Oak Tree =

Conceptual artwork by Michael Craig-Martin

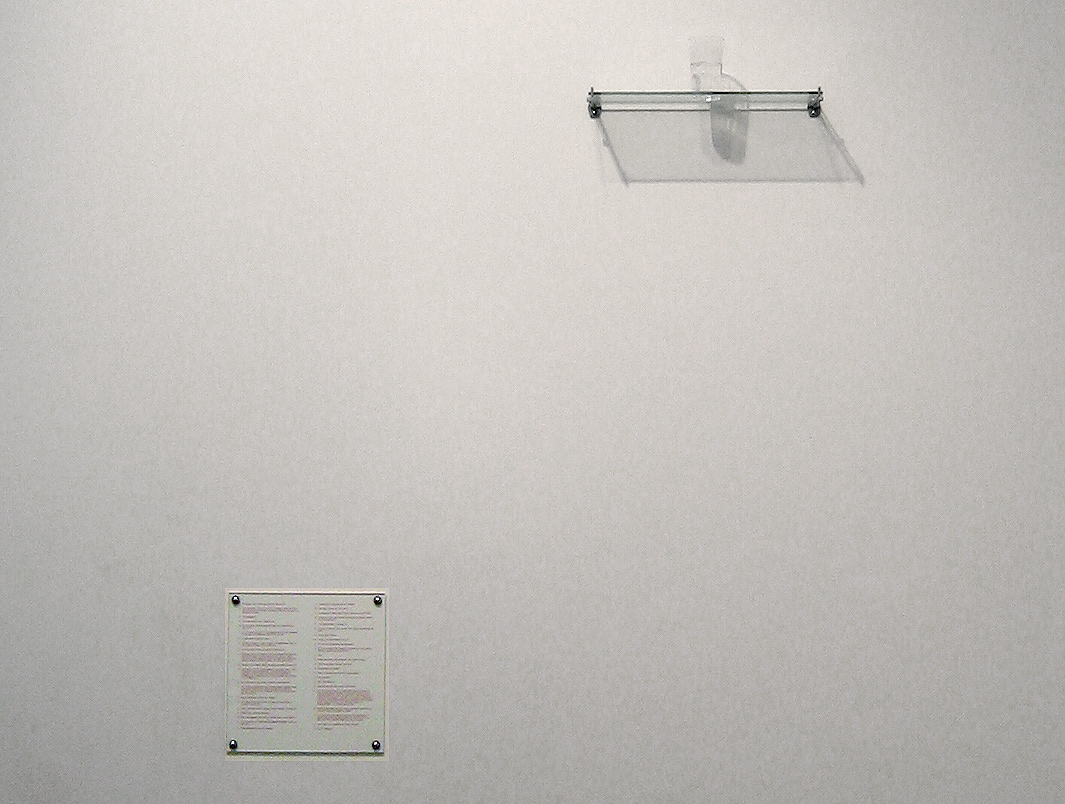
An Oak Tree by Michael Craig-Martin. 1973

An Oak Tree is a conceptual work of art created by Michael Craig-Martin (born 1941) in 1973. The piece, described as an oak tree, is installed in two units – a pristine installation of a glass of water on a glass shelf on metal brackets 253 centimetres above the ground, and a text mounted on the wall. When first exhibited, the text was given as a handout.

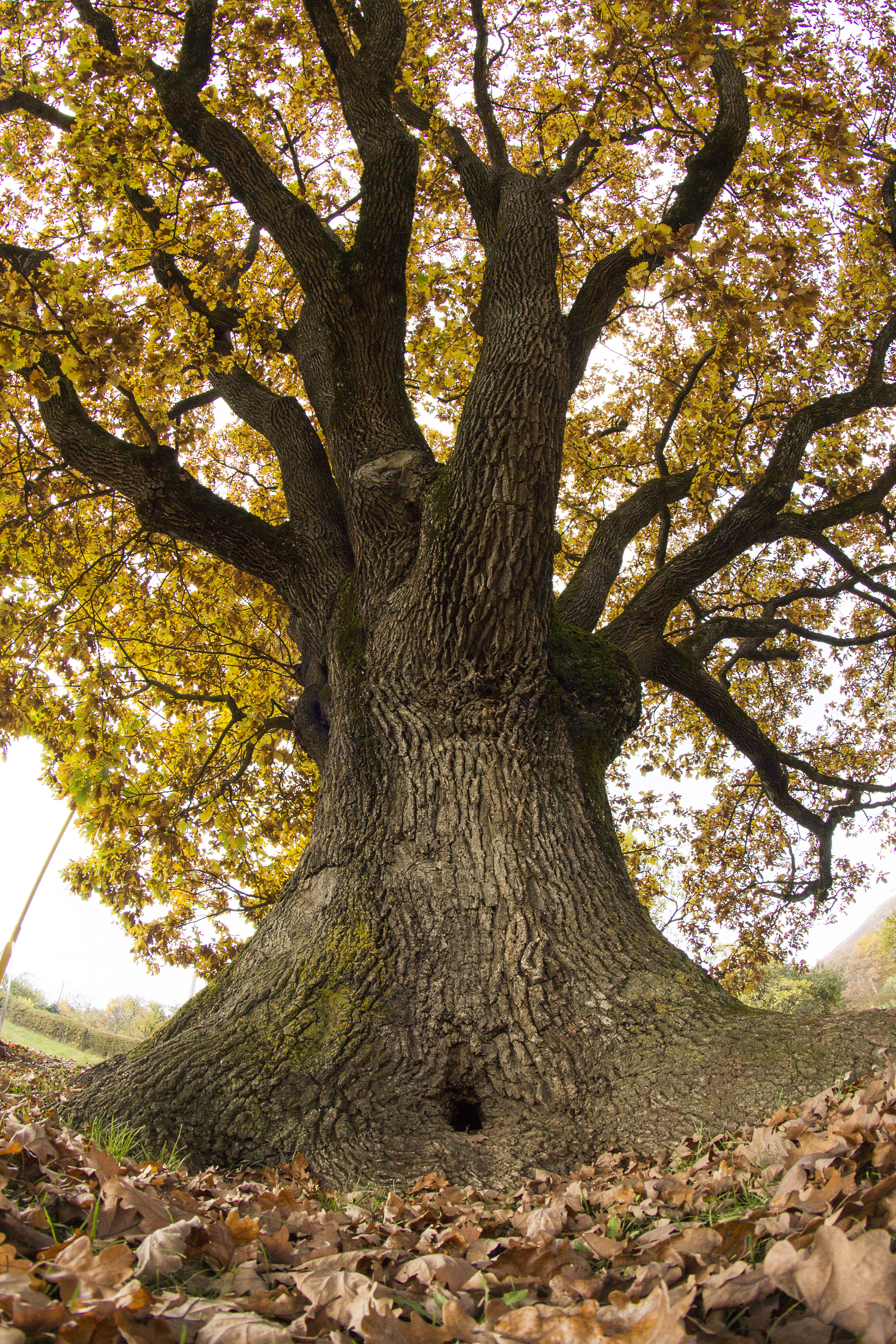
A full-grown oak tree

The text takes the form of a Q&A about the artwork, in which Craig-Martin describes changing "a glass of water into a full-grown oak tree without altering the accidents of the glass of water," and explains that "the actual oak tree is physically present but in the form of the glass of water." Craig-Martin considered "the work of art in such a way as to reveal its single basic and essential element, belief that is the confident faith of the artist in his capacity to speak and the willing faith of the viewer in accepting what he has to say".

The Catholic Herald compared the work to the Roman Catholic doctrine of Transubstantiation and the Real Presence.

The original is in the National Gallery of Australia, and an artist's copy is on loan to the Tate gallery.

== Artwork ==
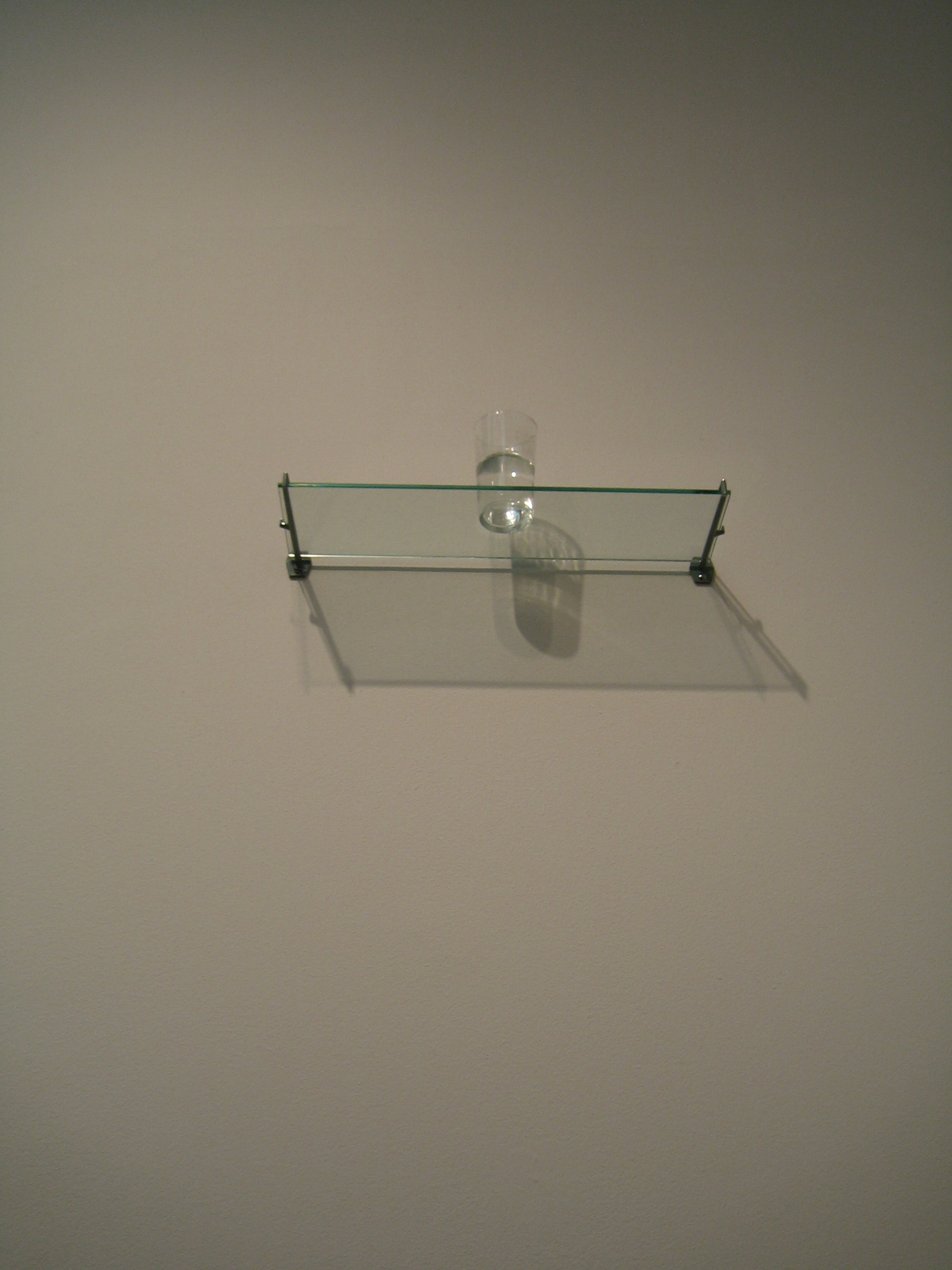
An Oak Tree

An Oak Tree is a work of art created by Michael Craig-Martin in 1973, and is now exhibited with the accompanying text, originally issued as a leaflet. The text is in red print on white; the object is a French Duralex glass, which contains water to a level stipulated by the artist and which is located on a glass shelf, whose ideal height is 253 centimetres with matte grey-painted brackets screwed to the wall. The text is behind glass and is fixed to the wall with four bolts. Craig-Martin has stressed that the components should maintain a pristine appearance and in the event of deterioration, the brackets should be resprayed and the glass and shelf even replaced.

The text contains a semiotic argument in the form of questions and answers, which explain that it is not a glass of water, but "a full-grown oak tree," created "without altering the accidents of the glass of water." The text defines accidents as "The colour, feel, weight, size...". The text includes the statement "It's not a symbol. I have changed the physical substance of the glass of water into that of an oak tree. I didn't change its appearance. The actual oak tree is physically present, but in the form of a glass of water." and "It would no longer be accurate to call it a glass of water. One could call it anything one wished but that would not alter the fact that it is an oak tree."

The impossible is deliberately asserted and the text examines the impossibility of the assertion, which uses the idea of transubstantiation in the same way as the Catholic religious belief that bread and wine, while maintaining an unchanged appearance, are changed into Christ's body and blood. Craig-Martin has a Catholic background and was an altar boy. He sees belief of both artist and viewer as having a key place in art, and that in An Oak Tree he had "deconstructed the work of art in such a way as to reveal its single basic and essential element", namely this belief.

Part of An Oak Tree's inspiration was Craig-Martin attempting to figure out what "the essence of a work of art" was, which he decided was "suspension of disbelief". The work was also a turning point in his artistic development: prior to it his concern had been deconstruction, and afterwards he was "trying to put the pieces together again." Subsequently, using the rationale of Marcel Duchamp's Fountain, he worked with drawings of utilitarian objects and flat areas of colour, with the goal of discarding meaning, which is "both persistent and unstable", although he states that people's need to create associations and meanings makes this goal unachievable.

== History ==
An Oak Tree was first shown in an exhibition of Craig-Martin's work at the Rowan Gallery, off Bond Street, London, in 1974. Many visitors assumed that Craig-Martin was playing the ultimate con trick, as there seemed no evidence of work on display in the white-walled gallery. However, high up on a wall was the glass of water and the glass shelf of the work An Oak Tree. At this time the accompanying text was available as a leaflet.

The original was purchased by the National Gallery of Australia in Canberra in 1977; an artist's copy has been on loan to the Tate gallery in London from a private collection since 2000.

Craig-Martin said, "An Oak Tree has had a great life as an artwork. It is nearly always on view somewhere, and has been shown all over the world—the text has been translated into at least 20 languages. The only place it has never been shown is in the US."

It was once barred by Australian officials from entering the country as "vegetation". Craig-Martin was forced to inform them that it was really a glass of water. He said, "It was of course a wonderfully funny incident, particularly because it extended into 'real life' the discussion about belief and doubt, and fact and fiction I was addressing in the work."

An artist's copy was shown by Gagosian Gallery at Frieze Masters 2021 art fair in London.

“An Oak Tree” was first shown in Asia in May 2022 at the Hangaram Art Museum in southern Seoul, in Craig-Martin's solo retrospective “Here and Now.”

== Critical reaction ==
An Oak Tree is a celebrated artwork, which the Irish Museum of Modern Art says is now recognised as a turning point in the development of conceptual art, although initially it was met with surprise, if not scorn. It has been described as "questioning the nature of reality."

The Stanford Encyclopedia of Philosophy states that "to fail to consider it a great work of art because it fails to give rise to a distinctively aesthetic kind of pleasure does not actually undermine the project at all. Conceptual art, as we now know, is about conveying meaning through a vehicular medium, and not to provide its audience with experiences of, say, beauty. Any attack on this fundamental feature of conceptual art targets not so much an individual work of art but rather finds fault with the artistic tradition itself."

In his Richard Dimbleby Lecture on 23 November 2000, Sir Nicholas Serota said, "We may not 'like' Craig-Martin's work, but it certainly reminds us that the appreciation of all art involves an act of faith comparable to the belief that, through transubstantiation, the bread and wine of Holy Communion become the body and blood of Christ."

Damien Hirst said, "That piece is, I think, the greatest piece of conceptual sculpture, I still can't get it out of my head."

Richard Cork called its original display in 1974 "one of the most challenging moments" of contemporary art.

Anthony Caro said, "Some of the stuff that's called art is just damned stupid. I mean, 'That glass of water's an oak tree' kind of thing." Art critic David Lee and the founders of the Stuckism art movement, Billy Childish and Charles Thomson also oppose it.

In response to Nigel Gosling's praise of the work, Giles Auty said, "How would the self-same critic react if, on ordering oak planks for an outhouse, he were sent instead a bucketful of water? Would he gently muse on 'the subtle and obscure waters of identity'—or make immediate reflections on the mental wellbeing of his timber suppliers?" Brian Sewell asked why "the miracle" was "a work of art fit only for a gallery, and not some thaumaturgical object venerated in a church?"

Michael Daley wrote that the work was "not a hard-won, skilful depiction of a glass and a shelf" and that for twenty years "instead of ridiculing the self-deluding, pretentious offerings of Craig-Martin and his like, critics fawned and eulogised."

== Derivative works ==
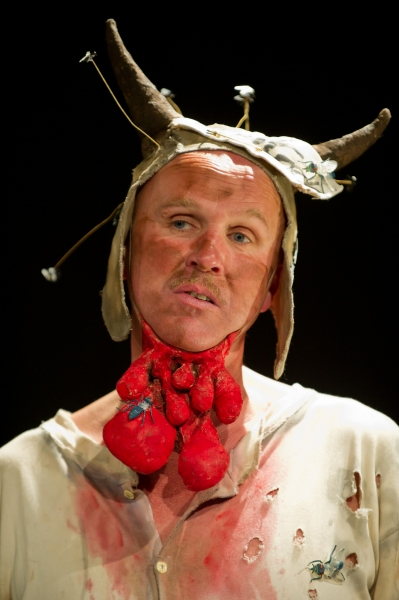
Tim Crouch

Tim Crouch has written and performed an eponymous play to critical acclaim in New York and London. The Little Artists (John Cake and Darren Neave) feature a Lego version in "Art Craziest Nation". An Oak Tree is quoted as an important influence in Ramsey Dukes' article Four Glasses of Water first published in The Journal for the Academic Study of Magic Issue 2, 2004.

== See also ==
- Substance theory
