= Anna Livia Löwendahl-Atomic =

Swedish artist

- Born: 1965 (age 60–61); Stockholm, Sweden
- Education: Chelsea College of Art and Design

Anna Livia Löwendahl-Atomic is a contemporary Swedish artist.

== Biography ==
Born in Stockholm in Sweden, Löwendahl-Atomic studied at the Chelsea College of Art and Design in London, graduating in 1995. She is best known for A Selection of Interesting Secrets from Various Stages in my Life, a conceptual artwork in which Löwendahl-Atomic sells her secrets one by one, the buyer having to sign a non-disclosure agreement to the effect that he or she can never reveal the secret to anyone. The work was exhibited at the Uppsala Art Museum in Sweden in 2000. Anna Livia has also exhibited with Decima gallery.

In 2003 a dispute over an alleged relationship between Löwendahl-Atomic's earlier work and a later work by another conceptual artist, Carey Young, shortlisted for the Beck's Futures prize arose. Young's contribution to the show was entitled Non-Disclosure Agreement. The exhibition sponsor had to sign a non-disclosure agreement promising not to tell about an art work by her which only he has seen. Young denied copying Löwendahl-Atomic's work.

Lowendahl-Atomic also uses the name Ana Dinextra for her work as a vocalist and lyricist. In 2007 she founded the Art rock band Where Everything Falls Out together with the Swedish composer Kenneth Cosimo. They have since started a collaboration with Graham Lewis, bassist and vocalist in the art combo Wire.

In 2009, Lowendahl-Atomic established The Muesum which she has installed in different locations around the world and is an ongoing project.
