= Fuckart & Pimp =

Media hoax

Fuckart & Pimp was a media hoax conceived by Alex Chappel and David C West in April 1998 which subjected London's Decima gallery to worldwide media attention and became a British front page newspaper sensation, as well as featuring on national television. The show was originally presented as a real event and managed to dupe many national newspapers in the UK before being revealed as a hoax.

== Beginning ==
The show "Fuckart & Pimp" was conceived by Alex Chappel and freelance reporter David C. West. An initial press release was sent out in April 1998 to newspapers and media describing the concept show, to open on 17 April: "Fuckart and Pimp" featured a Canadian artist named Angela Marshall. The gallery (the Pimp) prostitutes the artist (the Whore), and the buyer (the Punter) has to consummate the sale of a painting by performing a sexual act with Angela. It was billed as "a stark comment on the world of contemporary art", and the show would "enable both the punter and Angela to fully understand the workings of the curator-artist relationship". Photographs were encouraged: "A small picture will cost £25 and require oral sex; a medium-size picture is full sex, at £50 and for a large painting at £75, 'anything kinky'".

== Media coverage ==
That same day, from 9pm onwards, press reporters from tabloid newspapers and ITN attended the gallery. As they were expecting to see an art show, one was staged. Angela Marshall arrived, "squeezed into a nine year old's leopard print leotard (she aspires to be 'in her twenties') and sporting a red rhinestone dog collar, hat, gloves, torn black stockings, topped by a blond wig and dark sunglasses", as The Scotsman reported.

As the event had not been promoted to the public, there were no regular attendees, with The Guardian speculating that they were "possibly deterred by the ranks of camera crews and reporters gathered outside the gallery". One customer (played by an actor) pretended to be a buyer named Mark Childs.

As The Scotsman put it, "Under a dim red light bulb, a man and two women - the second being the artist's Scottish 'assistant' Jessica Konopka - thrashed about on a dirty mattress in a pathetic pantomime copulation". Footage broadcast on London Tonight showed Mark Childs leaving the gallery with lipstick smeared on his face, carrying a painting bearing the slogan 'Media Cunts', written in lipstick. The painting was digitally blurred for broadcast.

The following day, 18 April, many British newspapers reported on the event, some skeptical as to its authenticity. Only The Daily Telegraph reported the hoax, under the headline: 'Hoaxers play to the gallery with sex and art show,' with a sub heading "Tom Leonard reports on the elaborate and bizarre activities of two publicity-seekers".

'Faking it in the name of art' gave a brief synopsis of the previous lengthier stories with the small inclusion of a quote: 'yesterday show organiser David West admitted, "It was a hoax...a charade."'

== Threatened legal action ==
A counter sabotage that fuelled much of the coverage was Southwark council's letter presented in full view of the cameras, warning that the property appeared to be being used for sexual entertainment, and that the show's curator may have committed an offence. If the exhibition continued, the gallery would be risking prosecution. This was on the evidence of the eyewitness reports of the undercover council officer who paid five pounds to watch the act through a spy hole, and was reported by The Scotsman as saying "she's still wearing the G-string but he's got all his kit off and they're definitely at it".

'Nick', as he was called in the article, publicly issued a warning for obscenity. Despite the insistence that the warning would not hinder the show continuing over the weekend, the event did not continue.

== Further References ==
- "The Independent", 28 & 30 April 1998
- "The Telegraph", 18 April 1998
- "The Mirror", 18 April 1998
- Cork, Richard "London Tonight", 17 April 1998
- Leonard, Tom "Hoaxers play to the gallery with sex and art show" "The Telegraph", 18 April 1998. Accessed 3 April 2007
- Watson-Smyth, Kate (18 April 1998). "A Brush with the law for artist selling sex". The Independent. Archived from the original on 6 November 2008 – via FindArticles.
