= Bertien van Manen =

Dutch photographer (1935–2024)

- Born: 15 February 1935; The Hague, Netherlands
- Died: 26 May 2024 (aged 89); Amsterdam, Netherlands
- Education: University of Leiden
- Occupation: Photographer
- Years active: 1977–2024

Bertien van Manen (15 February 1935 – 26 May 2024) was a Dutch photographer. She started her career as a fashion photographer, after having studied French and German languages and literature. Inspired by Robert Frank's The Americans she travelled around, photographing what she saw. She had her first exhibition in The Photographers' Gallery in London in 1977 and since then her work has been exhibited in the Museum of Modern Art, New York, the Maison européenne de la photographie in Paris, the Stedelijk Museum Amsterdam, and the Fotomuseum Winterthur. Van Manen's work is found in major public collections.

== Life and work ==
Bertien van Manen was born on 15 February 1935 in The Hague. She started her photography career in 1974 as a fashion photographer after studying French language and literature at the University of Leiden.

Inspired by Robert Frank's book The Americans (1958), van Manen switched from fashion photography to a more documentary approach, she travelled around, photographing what she saw. She uses an inexpensive snapshot camera to take photos of people she meets, as she feels that these cameras allow her subjects to consider "me as a tourist or friend, who likes to take pictures." She has photographed extensively in China, the Appalachian Mountains in the US and the former Soviet Union.

She worked on commission and for long running projects, such as A Hundred Summers, A Hundred Winters (1991) about the post-Soviet states, East Wind, West Wind (2001) about China, Give me your Image (2006) about Europe, Moonshine (2014) with photographs of mining families in the Appalachian Mountains, and Beyond Maps and Atlases (2016) from Ireland.

In 2011 Let's Sit Down Before We Go was published by MACK, edited by Stephen Gill. In 2017 I Will be Wolf was published by MACK, edited by Stephen Gill.

Van Manen died in Amsterdam on 26 May 2024, at the age of 89.

== Publications ==
- A Hundred Summers, A Hundred Winters. Amsterdam: De Verbeelding, 1994.
- East Wind West Wind. Amsterdam: De Verbeelding, 2001.
- In Moldova. Aorta Chisinau, 2005.
- Give me your Image. Göttingen: Steidl, 2006.
- Let's Sit Down Before we go. London: Mack, 2011.Edited by Stephen Gill.
- Easter and Oak Trees. London: Mack, 2013.
- Moonshine. London: Mack, 2014.
- Beyond Maps and Atlases. London: Mack, 2016. ISBN 9781910164433.
- I Will be Wolf. London: Mack, 2017. Edited by Stephen Gill. ISBN 978-1-910164-91-4.
- Gluckauf. FW, 2023.
- I am the Only Woman There. FW, 2024. ISBN 978-9083451008.

== Exhibitions ==
=== Solo exhibitions ===
- A Hundred Summers, A Hundred Winters, Fotomuseum Winterthur,1995
- East Wind West Wind, The Photographers' Gallery, London, 2002
- Beyond the Image: Bertien van Manen & Friends, Stedelijk Museum Amsterdam, 2019
- Wish I Were Here , Fotomuseum Winterthur, 2022
- Bertien van Manen, les échos de l'ordinaire, Centre d'art GwinZegal, 2025

=== Group exhibitions ===
- Museum of Modern Art, New York

== Collections ==
Van Manen's work is held in the following public collections:

- Rijksmuseum, Amsterdam
- Fotomuseum Antwerp
- Maison européenne de la photographie, Paris
- Fotomuseum Winterthur, Winterthur, Switzerland
- Stedelijk Museum Amsterdam, Amsterdam
- Museum of Modern Art, New York
- Metropolitan Museum of Art, New York
- San Francisco Museum of Modern Art, San Francisco
