= Aaron Barschak =

British comedian

Aaron Alexander Barschak (born 1966 in Southwark, London) is an English self-styled "comedy terrorist" and fringe UK politician. In 2003, he attracted media attention by gatecrashing Prince William's 21st birthday party.

== Background ==
Aaron Barschak was born in 1966 and grew up in Hampstead in North London attending City of London School where he learnt French and Spanish.l After leaving school, Barschak travelled to Bolivia working at importing Western pop records and later moved to New York to study acting. According to his father, he has "craved attention" since he was a boy.

== The Windsor Castle gatecrash ==
Barschak came to public attention on 21 June 2003 when he gatecrashed Prince William's 21st birthday party at Windsor Castle whilst wearing a pink dress, a false beard and a turban in a fashion similar to Osama bin Laden. He scaled the walls of the castle and entered William's party. He was arrested shortly after reaching the stage where William was giving a speech. Barschak was not prosecuted. The intrusion triggered a police investigation into the security breach.

== Edinburgh Festival appearances ==
Barschak appeared for a three-week run at the Underbelly venue at the 2003 Edinburgh Fringe with a show entitled Osama Likes It Hot co-written with Brendhan Lovegrove, Barschak's show received a string of negative reviews.

== Election campaigns ==
Barschak stood as an independent candidate at the Brent East by-election of 2003, finishing 14th of 16 candidates, with 37 votes (0.2%).

He stood again in Witney in the 2010 General Election, against David Cameron, leader of the Conservative Party, coming last of 10 with 53 votes (0.1%). As part of his campaign, Barschak called for the closure of the nearby detention centre Campsfield House, and arrived at the election count dressed as Jesus.

== Other notable stunts ==
In 2003 Barschak was found guilty of causing criminal damage and imprisoned for one month after he threw a bucket of red paint over the artist Jake Chapman apparently in protest (albeit in a suitably parodic form) over the latter's vandalism of a series of original prints of Goya's The Disasters of War.

In 2005, he was arrested and bailed following an incident in Wapping.

== Poetry ==
Since the early 2000's, Barschak has faded into relative obscurity. However, he can be found performing on the London poetry circuit, and in 2023 was commended in the Poetry Kit International Poetry Competition.
