= Neil Zakiewicz =

British artist

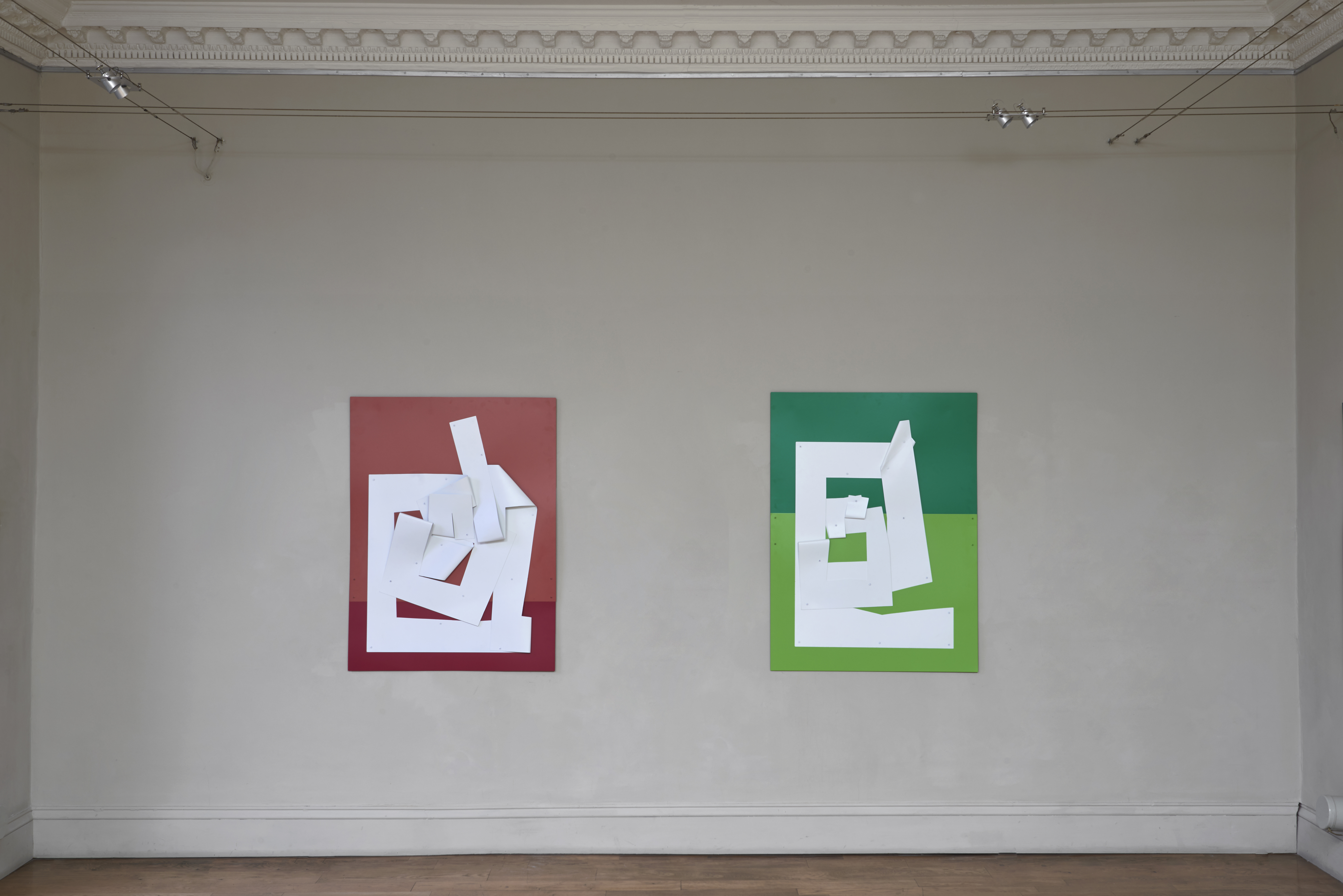
Installation of paintings at Domobaal Gallery 2022. Photo Andy Keate

Neil Zakiewicz (born 1972 in London, United Kingdom) is a British artist working across painting and sculpture media. Originally a sculptor, in 2013 he made a shift towards painting. The paintings, however, retain a sculptural element. In 2018 he produced ceramic works for a solo exhibition at Domobaal Gallery which, by their presentation on the wall, are also reminiscent of painting and drawing. The work mixes artistic conventions, playfully reconfiguring traditional media with industrial processes.

In the late 1990s Zakiewicz co-founded the Unit art collective (active 1997 - 1999). He completed an MA in Fine Art at Goldsmiths College in 2003.

Zakiewicz has exhibited at domobaal, London, Cell Project Space, London and Gasworks Gallery in London, and the Samsung Institute for Art and Design (Seoul), Liquidacion Total (Madrid), Zauberhaft at Waldschlösschen (Dresden), Klink & Bank (Reykjavík), Helen Pitt Gallery (Vancouver), Galerie Lucy Mackintosh (Lausanne), Draíocht (Dublin), and Konstakuten (Stockholm). He is represented by domobaal, London.
