= Joshua Compston =

British art curator (1970–1996)

- Born: Joshua Richard Compston; 1 June 1970; Putney, London, England
- Died: 5 March 1996 (aged 25); Shoreditch, London, England
- Resting place: Kensal Green Cemetery
- Education: Camberwell School of Art, Courtauld Institute of Art
- Known for: Contemporary art
- Notable work: A Fete Worse Than Death, Other Men's Flowers
- Movement: Factual Nonsense, Young British Artists
- Patron(s): Jeremy Fry, Charles Booth-Clibborn

Joshua Richard Compston (1 June 1970 – 5 March 1996) was a London curator whose company Factual Nonsense was closely associated with the emergence of the Young British Artists (YBAs).

== Early life and career beginnings ==
Compston was born in Putney. The son of a judge, he was educated at St Edward's School, Oxford. Encouraged by his parents, Compston became an enthusiastic collector of antiques and ephemera. In his adolescence, he developed a friendship with Sir Peter Blake, and would bring him gifts of found ephemera.

Compston studied Art Foundation at Camberwell School of Art, followed by History of Art at the Courtauld Institute of Art. At Camberwell, Compston was the contemporary of Darren Coffield, who later became his biographer.

At the Courtauld he soon became frustrated that the academic lecturing staff were taking insufficient interest in the work of living artists, and that as a result students were ignorant of major figures in 20th century art. Traditionally, students at the Courtauld had been taught in rooms hung with the masterworks from the history of art borrowed from the affiliated Courtauld Gallery. Taking advantage of a relocation of the school to new premises in Somerset House, and newly empty walls in seminar rooms, he leveraged the Courtauld into exhibiting the work of contemporary painters on long-term temporary loan as 'The East Wing Collection' – a practice which continues to this day as 'The East Wing Biennial'. Past exhibitors in the Collection/Biennial include Mel Bochner, Damien Hirst, Howard Hodgkin, Michael Landy, Del LaGrace Volcano, Gilbert and George, Genesis P-Orridge and Martha Rosler. He graduated from the Courtauld in 1992. At this time, he was associated with the American gallerist Maureen Paley.

Joshua Compston first worked in commercial galleries when he became David Taborn's agent, curating Taborn's show at Gallery 202, Notting Hill Gate in 1989.

Joshua Compston's initial exposure to pre YBA Shoreditch happened partly by accident, due to an infatuation with a daughter of writer Jocasta Innes and whose Spitalfields kitchen became a late night meeting point for Compston, Will Hodgkinson and many other creatives. This in turn led to renting a room at the next door house of Architect Sir Richard MacCormac.

== Factual Nonsense ==
In 1993, he opened a gallery at 44a Charlotte Road, Shoreditch, the first gallery to open in what was then a slightly run-down part of east London. European Dadaist manifestos, 20th century propaganda and the Arts and Crafts Movement were influences in his creation of the Factual Nonsense brand and concept of social philosophy. The name of the gallery and art movement was taken from the title of a painting 'Factual Nonsense' by David Taborn, whose work 'A Guide for the Perplexed' was also used by Compston as the title for the gallery inaugural exhibition.

As well as working with many of the artists of the YBA movement, including Gavin Turk, Tracey Emin, Sarah Lucas, Angus Fairhurst and Damien Hirst, Compston's main collaborator was the printer Thomas Shaw, with whom he created numerous Factual Nonsense posters, prints and other printed matter.

Compston organised events in Shoreditch as a part of his deliberate vision: to shape an artistic community and to create an urban regeneration, both of which became his legacy. The events included two summer fetes (A Fete Worse Than Death), and a picnic in Hoxton Square (The Hanging Picnic). Compston's lasting legacy to Shoreditch was celebrated by a revival of A Fete Worse Than Death in 2014. His archive is held by the Tate Gallery.

== Death ==
In 1996, at the age of 25, Compston died as the result of taking ether at his gallery in Charlotte Road, which was also his home. His coffin was painted with a William Morris pattern by Gary Hume and Gavin Turk. His funeral was attended by several hundred mourners including leading figures of the London art scene. He is buried at Kensal Green Cemetery. Compston's tomb, on which he is depicted laid out on his little Thames boat, was carved from Portland stone by the artist and cartoonist Zebedee Helm.

== Published biographies ==
- Jeremy Cooper – No Fun Without U: The Art of Factual Nonsense, 2000
- Darren Coffield – Factual Nonsense: The Art and Death of Joshua Compston, 2013
