= Stephen Gill (photographer) =

British photographer (born 1971)

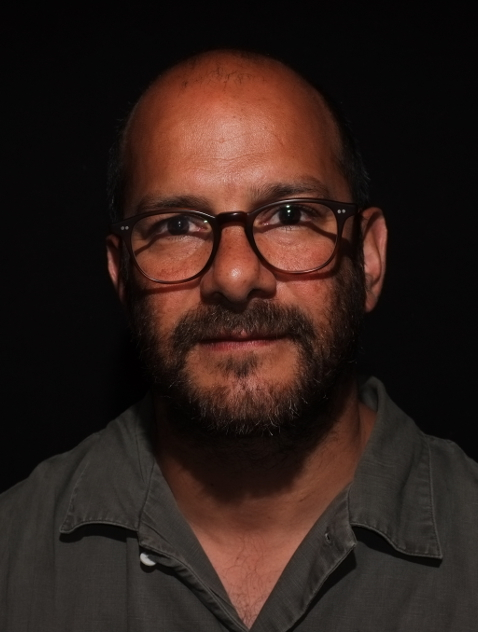
- Gill in 2014
- Born: 1971 (age 54–55); Bristol, England
- Occupation: Photographer
- Website: www.stephengill.co.uk

Stephen Gill (born 1971) is a British experimental, conceptual and documentary photographer. His work has been exhibited internationally along with his books that are a key aspect of his practice.

== Publications ==
=== Books by Gill ===
- A Book of Field Studies. London: Chris Boot, 2004. ISBN 978-0954281366. Introduction by Jon Ronson. Subjects divided into separate series 'Day Return', 'Trolleys Portraits', 'Lost', and 'Trolleys Portraits'.
- Invisible. 2005. ISBN 0-9549405-0-4.
- Hackney Wick. London: Self-published / Nobody in association with Archive of Modern Conflict, 2005. ISBN 0-9549405-1-2.
- Buried. 2006. ISBN 0-9549405-4-7.
- Archaeology in Reverse.
  - London: Self-published / Nobody; Archive of Modern Conflict, 2007. ISBN 0-9549405-5-5. Afterword by Iain Sinclair. Edition of 3000 copies.
  - London: Self-published / Nobody; Archive of Modern Conflict, 2007. Special edition in salamander case and including print. Edition of 100 copies.
- Hackney Flowers.
  - London: Self-published / Nobody, 2007. ISBN 0-9549405-3-9. Edition of 3500 copies.
  - London: Self-published / Nobody, 2007. Special edition made from waste paper sheets and including a print. Edition of 100 copies.
- Anonymous Origami. London: Self-published / Nobody; Archive of Modern Conflict, 2007. ISBN 978-0-9549405-8-4.
- A Series of Disappointments.
  - London: Self-published / Nobody; Archive of Modern Conflict, 2008. ISBN 0-9556577-0-9. Edition of 3000 copies available in three different covers.
  - London: Self-published / Nobody; Archive of Modern Conflict, 2008. Special edition, in a box with a print and stencil. Edition of 100 copies, mixed covers.
- Warming Down. London: Self-published / Nobody, 2008. Photographs taken in Hackney Wick. 15 C-Type prints and one lino print housed in an ex Hackney Library music score book. Edition of 130 copies.
- The Hackney Rag. London: Self-published / Nobody; Tokyo: Artbeat, 2009. Newspaper format. Text by Shigeo Goto. Published on the occasion of Gill's first solo exhibition in Japan. Selections from his Hackney series Hackney Wick, Buried, Hackney Flowers, Hackney Flower portraits, Archaeology in Reverse and Warming Down as well as new images. Includes a print. Edition of 1000 copies.
- Trinidad 44 photographs. London: Self-published / Nobody, 2009. 44 loose C-Type prints and a dry point etching, housed within the shell of a scooped out 1964 publication. Edition of 115 copies.
- Coming up for Air. London: Self-published / Nobody; Archive of Modern Conflict, 2010. ISBN 978-0-9556577-2-6.
- Outside In. Brighton, England: Photoworks; London: Archive of Modern Conflict, 2010. ISBN 978-1-903796-40-5. Produced as part of Gill's commission to make a series of photographs for the 2010 Brighton Photo Biennial.
- B Sides. Companion book to Coming up for Air.
  - London: Self-published / Nobody, 2010. ISBN 978-0-9556577-4-0.
  - London: Self-published / Nobody, 2010. Special edition in a box with a print. Edition of 100 copies and 5 artist's proofs.
- Off Ground. Text by Iain Sinclair. Photographs of bricks and rocks picked up in the aftermath of the Hackney riots.
  - London: Self-published / Nobody; Archive of Modern Conflict, 2011. Newspaper format. Edition of 2000 copies.
  - London: Self-published / Nobody; Archive of Modern Conflict, 2011. Newspaper format. Includes print. Edition of 100 copies.
- Coexistence. 2012. ISBN 978-2-919873-10-4. Edition of 1500 copies, 250 copies of each cover.
- Not in Service. London: Self-published / Nobody, 2012. Newspaper format. Published on the occasion of Stephen Gill Best Before End retrospective exhibition at Foam Fotografiemuseum Amsterdam, May–July 2012. Includes image extracts from series Talking to Ants, Off Ground, Hackney Wick, Best Before End, Hammer and Blackberry, Hackney Flowers, A Series of Disappointments, Trolley Portraits and Billboards. Text by Iain Sinclair.
- Best Before End. Text by Will Self. Photographs made in East London, colour negative films part processed and soaked in energy drink.
  - London: Self-published / Nobody, 2014.
  - London: Self-published / Nobody, 2014. Special edition, in a clamshell box with a print. Edition of 100 copies and 5 artist's proofs.
- Talking to Ants. Photographs made in East London between 2009 and 2013.
  - London: Self-published / Nobody, 2014. ISBN 978-0-9575369-1-3.
  - London: Self-published / Nobody, 2014. ISBN 978-0-9575369-2-0. Special edition, in a clamshell box with a print. Edition of 100 copies and 5 artist's proofs.
- Pigeons. London: Self-published / Nobody; Archive of Modern Conflict, 2014. Words by Will Self.
- Hackney Kisses. London: Self-published / Nobody; Archive of Modern Conflict, 2014. ISBN 978-0-9570490-7-9. Photographer unknown, edited and produced by Gill, words by Timothy Prus.
- Night Procession. Self-published / Nobody, 2017. ISBN 978-0-9575369-3-7. Photographs by Gill, words by Karl Ove Knausgård.
  - Self-published / Nobody, 2017. With print. ISBN 978-0-9575369-4-4.
- The Pillar. Self-published / Nobody, 2019. ISBN 9789198523300. Photographs by Gill, words by Karl Ove Knausgård. Winner of the 2019 Les Rencontres de la Photographie author book award. Self-published / Nobody, 2019. ISBN 9789198523317.
- Please Notify The Sun. Self-published / Nobody, 2021. Photographs by Gill, words by Karl Ove Knausgård.
- Variations on a Theme: The Pillar. Self-published / Nobody, 2024. Edition of 180 copies.

=== Books edited by Gill ===
- Unseen UK: a book of photographs by the people at Royal Mail. London: Royal Mail, 2006. ISBN 0-946165-53-X.
- Bright, Bright Day by Andrei Tarkovsky. London: White Space Gallery, 2008. ISBN 0-9557394-1-1. Polaroid photographs by Tarkovsky, edited by Gill. Edition of 3000 copies.
- Let's Sit Down Before we go by Bertien van Manen. London: Mack, 2011. ISBN 978-1-907946-12-7.
- I Will Be Wolf by Bertien van Manen. London: Mack, 2017. ISBN 9781910164914.

== Exhibitions ==
- 2003: Hackney Wick, Photographers' Gallery, London
- 2004: Field Studies, Rencontres d'Arles, Arles, France
- 2004: Field Studies, Museum of Architecture, Moscow
- 2005: Stephen Gill Photographs, Architectural Association School of Architecture, London
- 2005: Invisible and Lost, PHotoEspaña, Real Jardín Botánico
- 2006: Toronto Photography Festival, Canada
- 2007: Anonymous Origami and Buried, Leighton House Museum, London
- 2012: Coexistence, National Audiovisual Centre, Luxembourg
- 2013: Best Before End, Foam Fotografiemuseum Amsterdam, Amsterdam. Exhibition of his London series made between 2000 and 2013.
- 2015: Myeyefellout, The Photographers' Gallery, London
- 2018: Stephen Gill. Vom Dokument zum Experiment: Fotografien, Projektionen, Bücher, Objekte (Stephen Gill. From document to experiment: photographs, projections, books and objects), Museum für Photographie (Braunschweig), April–June 2018.

== Collections ==
Gill's work is held in the following permanent collections:

- Victoria and Albert Museum, London: 10 prints (as of 12 May 2024)
- National Portrait Gallery, London: 4 prints (as of 12 May 2024)
- The Tate, London: 16 prints (as of 12 May 2024)
- Museum of London, London
