= Neil Gall =

British artist (born 1967)

Neil Gall (born 1967 in Aberdeen, Scotland) is a London-based painter. He works with processes including modelling, assemblage, photography and painting. He received his BA in painting at Gray's School of Art and then attended Slade School of Art in London in 1991. He has received awards including the Abby Major Award in 1993 from The British School at Rome, the Jerwood Painting Prize in 1999, and was the artist in residence at Durham Cathedral in 1993.

== Selected exhibitions ==
- 2008 ScheiblerMitte, Berlin
- 2008 Something Less, Something More, Gallery One One One, London
- 2007 Max. Durchfahrtshöhe, ScheiblerMitte, Berlin
- 2007 Layer Cake, Fabio Tiboni Art Contemporanea, Bologna
- 2007 Small Wonders, The Grey Gallery, London
- 2006 World Gone Mad, Milton Keynes Art Gallery, Milton Keynes, traveled to Herbert Read Gallery, Canterbury and Lime House Arts Foundation, London
- 2005 Atoll Villas, Hales Gallery, London
- 2004 Tubeway Army, Keih Talent Up West
- 2004 Obstractivist, Hales Gallery, London
- 2003 Blow up, St. Paul's Gallery, Birmingham
- 2001 Model Paintings, Agnews, London
- 1999 Equinox, Cain Gallery, Nailsworth
- 1999 Jerwood Painting Prize 1999, Jerwood Gallery, London

== Publications ==
2007 Neil Gall, Shelf Life, Published 2007, Publisher, Black Dog Publishing

== Collections ==
- Aberdeen City Art Gallery
- Royal Scottish Academy, Edinburgh
- Unilever
- Simmons & Simmons
- Hiscox
- Felstad
- Insinger de Beaufort
- The Lodeveans Collection
- Various Private Collections

== Sources ==
- Neil Gall- The Outward Urge
- Neil Gall
