= Matt Calderwood =

Northern Ireland artist

Matt Calderwood (born 1975) is a Northern Ireland artist who is most famous for a piece of rope constructed from 50 rolls of toilet paper, which Charles Saatchi bought for a reputed 6,000 Euros.

Calderwood is from Rasharkin in County Antrim. His work could be defined as sculpture or installation and is characterised by risk taking and purposelessness in tightly and often precariously balanced juxtapositions of objects. In February 2011 Matt Calderwood was commissioned by the music group The Streets to make a video work as part of their musical 'takeover' of The Guardian's website.
