= Darren Coffield =

British painter (born 1969)

- Born: 1969 (age 56–57); London, England
- Occupation: Painter
- Website: www.darcoff.com

Darren Coffield (born 1969, in London) is a British painter.

== Biography ==
Coffield studied at Goldsmiths College, Camberwell School of Art and the Slade School of Art in London, where he received his Bachelor's Degree in 1993 in Fine Arts. He has exhibited at venues ranging from the Courtauld Institute, Somerset House to the National Portrait Gallery, London.

In the early 1990s, Coffield worked with Joshua Compston on the formation of Factual Nonsense — the centre of the emerging YBA scene. He subsequently wrote Factual Nonsense: The Art and Death of Joshua Compston, published in 2013.

In 2003, his controversial portrait of Ivan Massow, former chairman of the ICA, in fox hunting attire, was exhibited at the National Portrait Gallery in London. Coffield has painted portraits of Molly Parkin, George Galloway, and Peter Tatchell. Coffield has painted Arthur Scargill using coal dust as a medium, and made protest art prints relating to The Battle of Orgreave.

Coffield lives and works in London.

== Work ==
The Triumph of David, ink on paper, 30 in × 24 in (760 mm × 610 mm), 1996.

Many of Coffield's paintings deal with cultural and political historical references. He references early Romantic artists such as Henry Fuseli and William Blake.

The Triumph of David (1996), for example, combined a Nicolas Poussin painting with an image of the marriage of Prince Charles and Lady Diana Spencer to create a new image.

In the Paradox Portraits series, Coffield inverts well known faces, in "an exploration of celebrity, identity and perception".

== Publications ==
- Factual Nonsense: The Art and Death of Joshua Compston
- Photographers of the Colony Room Club (Self-published 2020)
- Tales from the Colony Room: Soho's Lost Bohemia (Unbound, 2021)
