= Gavin Turk =

British artist (born 1967)

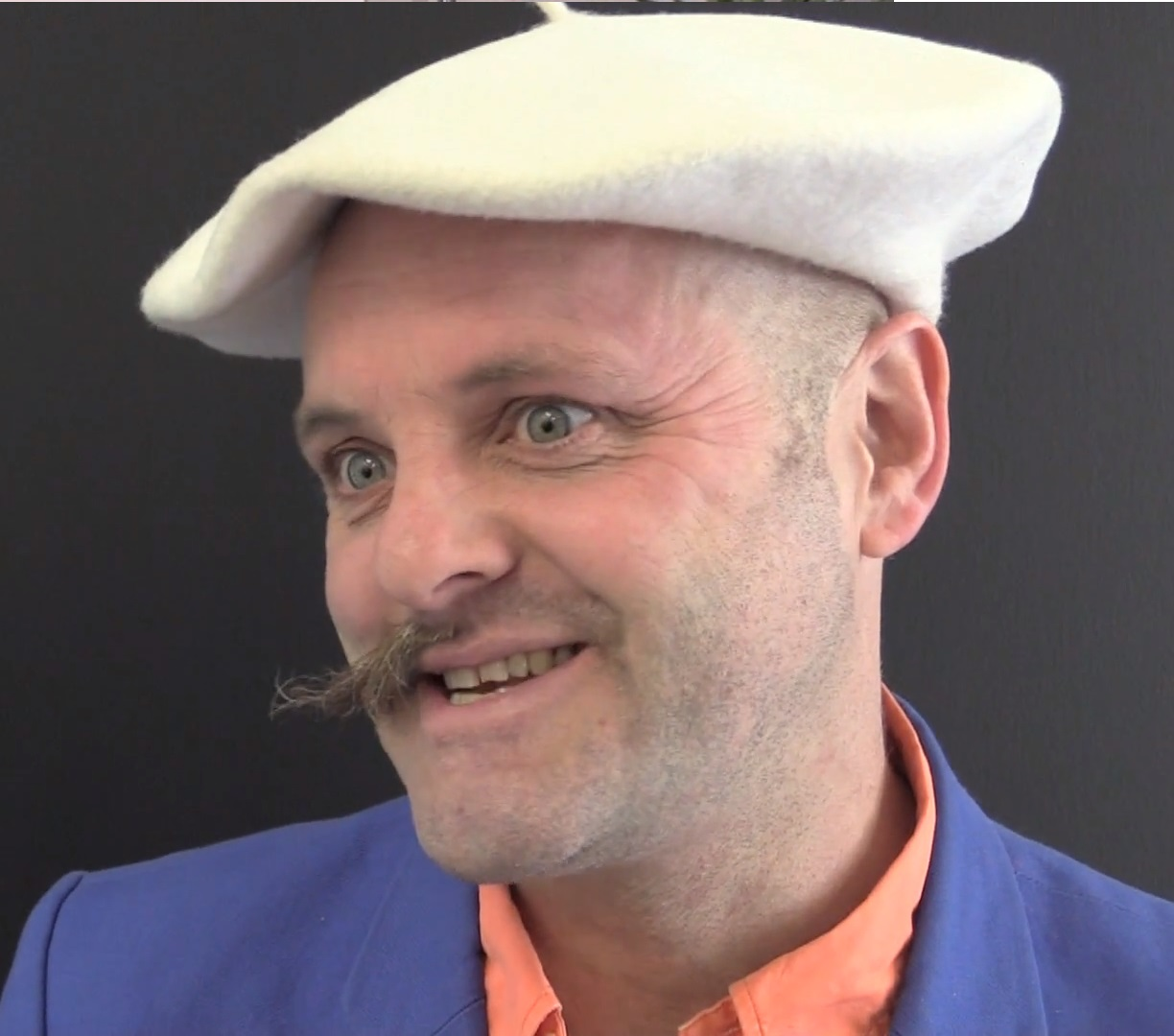
- Gavin Turk, Beard Project April 2015
- Born: 1967 (age 58–59); Guildford, England
- Website: http://www.gavinturk.com

Gavin Turk (born 1967) is a British artist from Guildford in Surrey, and was considered to be one of the Young British Artists. Turk's oeuvre deals with issues of authenticity and identity, engaged with modernist and avant-garde debates surrounding the 'myth' of the artist and the 'authorship' of a work of art.

== Early work ==
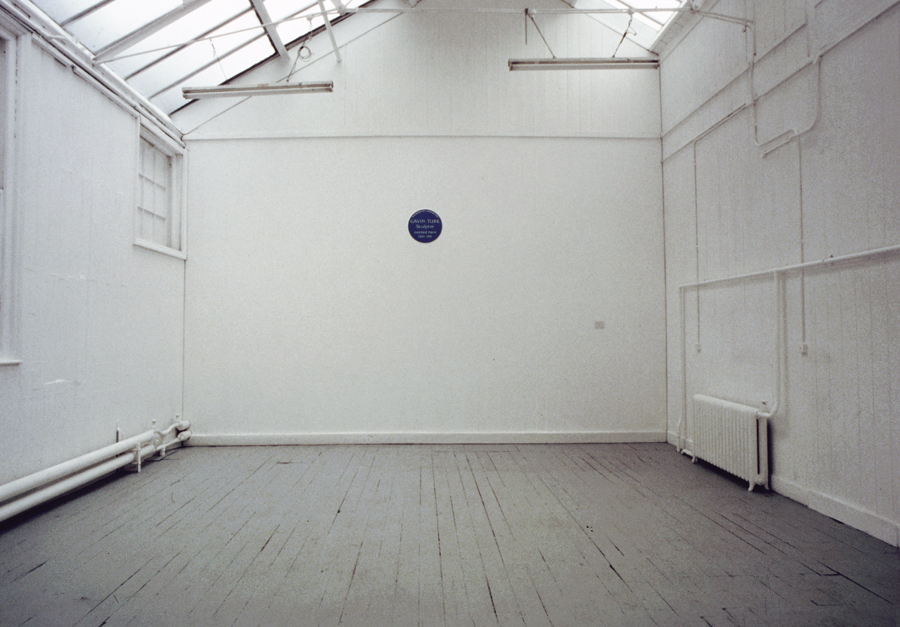
Gavin Turk, 'Cave' installation, Royal College of Art, 1991

Turk studied at Chelsea School of Art from 1986 to 1989, and at the Royal College of Art from 1989 to 1991.

In 1991, tutors at the Royal College of Art refused to present Gavin Turk with his postgraduate degree, a decision based on his graduation exhibition, which was titled Cave, and consisted of a whitewashed studio space, containing a blue heritage plaque of the kind normally found on historic buildings, commemorating his own presence as a sculptor, stating "Gavin Turk worked here, 1989–1991". This bestowed some instant notoriety on Turk, whose work was collected by numerous collectors including Charles Saatchi, who later exhibited Turk's work in the exhibition Sensation, which toured London (Royal Academy of Arts), Berlin (Hamburger Bahnhof) and New York (Brooklyn Museum). Turk attended the private view of the Sensation exhibition at the Royal Academy, dressed as a down-and-out. The blue plaque from the Cave installation was later exhibited in a museum style case as Relic (Cave), he also had a version of it made by one of the companies who make blue plaques for English Heritage and this is in the Tate collection.

He has subsequently produced an extensive body of work, which purports to question the value and integrity of a hermetic artistic identity. Turk was considered to be one of the group of artists known as the Young British Artists.

== Practice ==
Turk's wide ranging practice often incorporates iconic images of figures taken from popular culture and art historical sources. A series of detailed life-sized waxworks, incorporating the artist's own appearance, features the artist assuming various poses as different characters, including Sid Vicious, Jean-Paul Marat, and the Marxist revolutionary Che Guevara. Turk's most famous work in this series, Pop (1993), is a waxwork of Turk as Sid Vicious. The work appropriates the stance of Andy Warhol's screen print of Elvis Presley. In the work, the right hand is pointing a gun, a motif which recurs in other works in the series, such as Bum (1998).

Turk has appropriated recognisable elements from artists such as Jacques-Louis David, Yves Klein, Marcel Duchamp, Andy Warhol, René Magritte, Alighiero Boetti, Robert Morris (artist), Jasper Johns and The Death of Marat painting by Jacques-Louis David.

== Elvis Presley and Che Guevara ==
Gavin Turk, Diamond Pink Elvis, 2005

From 2005 Turk began producing a small number of silkscreen works on canvas, depicting himself as Elvis Presley, in a pose taken from the paintings by Andy Warhol of the same subject from the 1960s, such as Warhol's Triple Elvis. Turk applied diamond dust to some of the Elvis works made from diamanté applied to silkscreened canvas in vibrant pop colours, which sparkles in direct light. Examples of Turk's Elvis series are Diamond Yellow Elvis, 2005 and Diamond Pink Elvis, 2005. A set of what appeared to be classic posters of Che Guevara in a beret, again revealed themselves on further scrutiny to be photos of Turk himself.

== Sculpture and public works ==
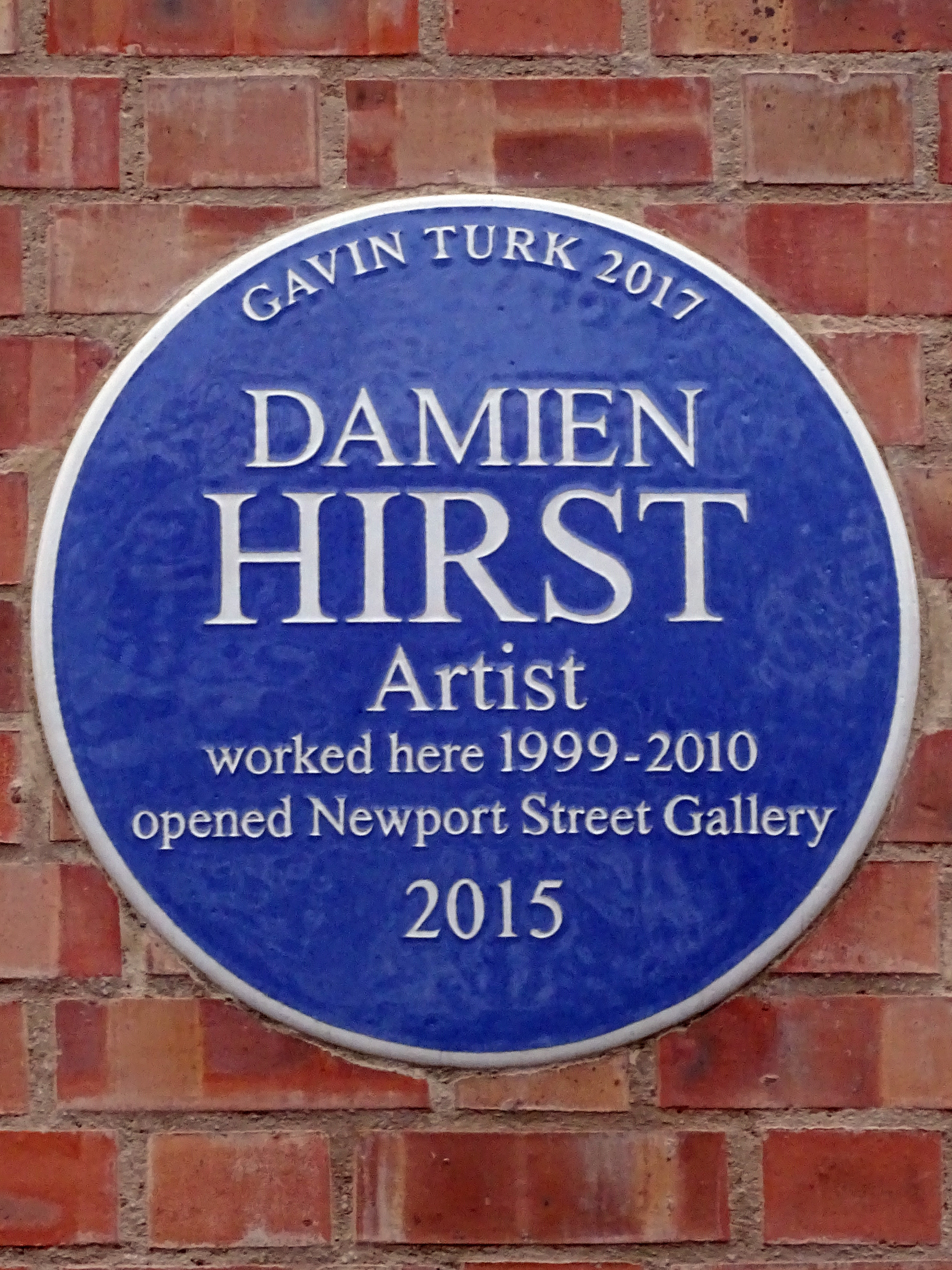
Blue Plaque by Turk

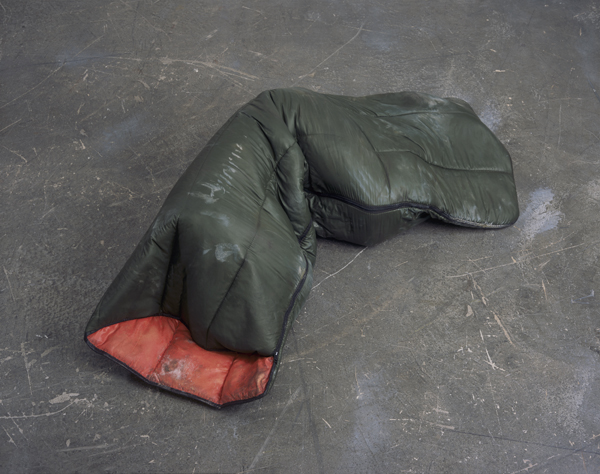
Gavin Turk, Nomad, 2002

A series of three-dimensional trompe-l'œil works includes objects cast into bronze, painted to give the appearance of the original object. Possibly his most revered works, these include bronze sculptures of plastic rubbish bags, see "Bag" (2000). Other sculptures include Nomad (2002), a bronze cast of a sleeping bag, and Box (2002), which resembles a cardboard box. Turk is perhaps the leading exponent of the painted bronze, and has cast objects from spent matches to worn paving slabs to discarded vehicle exhaust pipes.

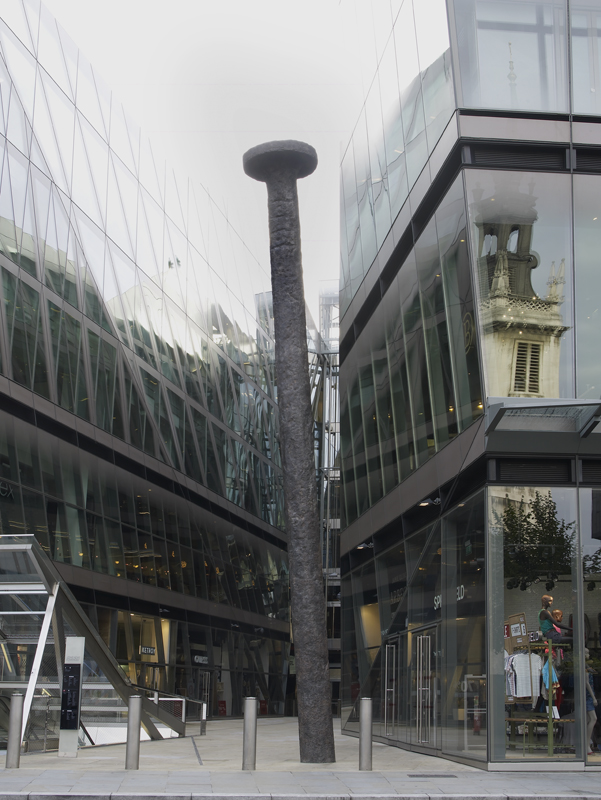
Nail, 2011, photo by Andy Keate

In December 2009, Turk took part in the "Bricks" exhibition at Area 10 in Peckham in Southeast London. However, the day before the exhibition was to start, organisers noticed that his piece entitled Revolting Brick had been stolen and replaced with a fake brick. The fake brick held the words "Thank You Have a Nice Day, Next" and was part of a set of 500 that was given away at the exhibition. Revolting Brick was number eight in a series of ten that Turk had created and signed. The artist stated that he "was upset but flattered" at what had happened and that the theft "raises questions about value and worth".

In May 2011, Turk's first large-scale, 12-metre public sculpture was unveiled between the One New Change City mall, designed by Pritzker Prize-winning architect Jean Nouvel, and St Paul's Cathedral.

In 2017 Turk placed an unofficial blue plaque commemorating Damien Hirst at Newport Street Gallery in London.

In June 2021, Gavin Turk's L'Âge d'Or, 2021, a larger than life bronze painted door, was installed opposite the Fenix Museum, as part of Sculpture International Rotterdam.

In September 2021, Gavin Turk made a piece called Piscio D'Artista whereby he canned his own urine and sold it for its weight in silver through Kickstarter, as an homage to Piero Manzoni's 1961 art piece Artist's Shit Merda D'Artista, in which Manzoni canned his own excrement and sold it for its weight in gold.

== Notable Artworks ==
Turk's work often challenge notions of authenticity, authorship and identity. Several of his works have received critical attention.

- Cave (1991) - a blue heritage plaque commemorating Gavin Turk himself, installed in his graduation show at the Royal College of Art. The piece was the reason the RCA refused to aware him a degree and has since become one of his most discussed works.
- Pop (1993) - a life-sized waxwork of the artist as Sid Vicious in the style of Andy Warhol's Elvis Presley paintings
- Death of Marat (1998) - a waxwork of the artist as Jean Paul Marat on his death bed, based on the painting of the same name by Jacques-Louis David.
- Nomad (2002) - a bronze sculpture of a sleeping bag cast in patina bronze, referencing homelessness, presence and absence, and the romanticised image of the artist.
- Bum (2000) - a life sized waxwork of the artist imitating a homeless person
- Bin Bag series (2000-2006) - a series of bronze cast bin bags painted to look real.
- Dumb Candle (2007) - a carving of a candle made from the top of an old broom handle, in 2007 Turk won the Charle Wollaston Award for the sculpture.

== Exhibitions ==
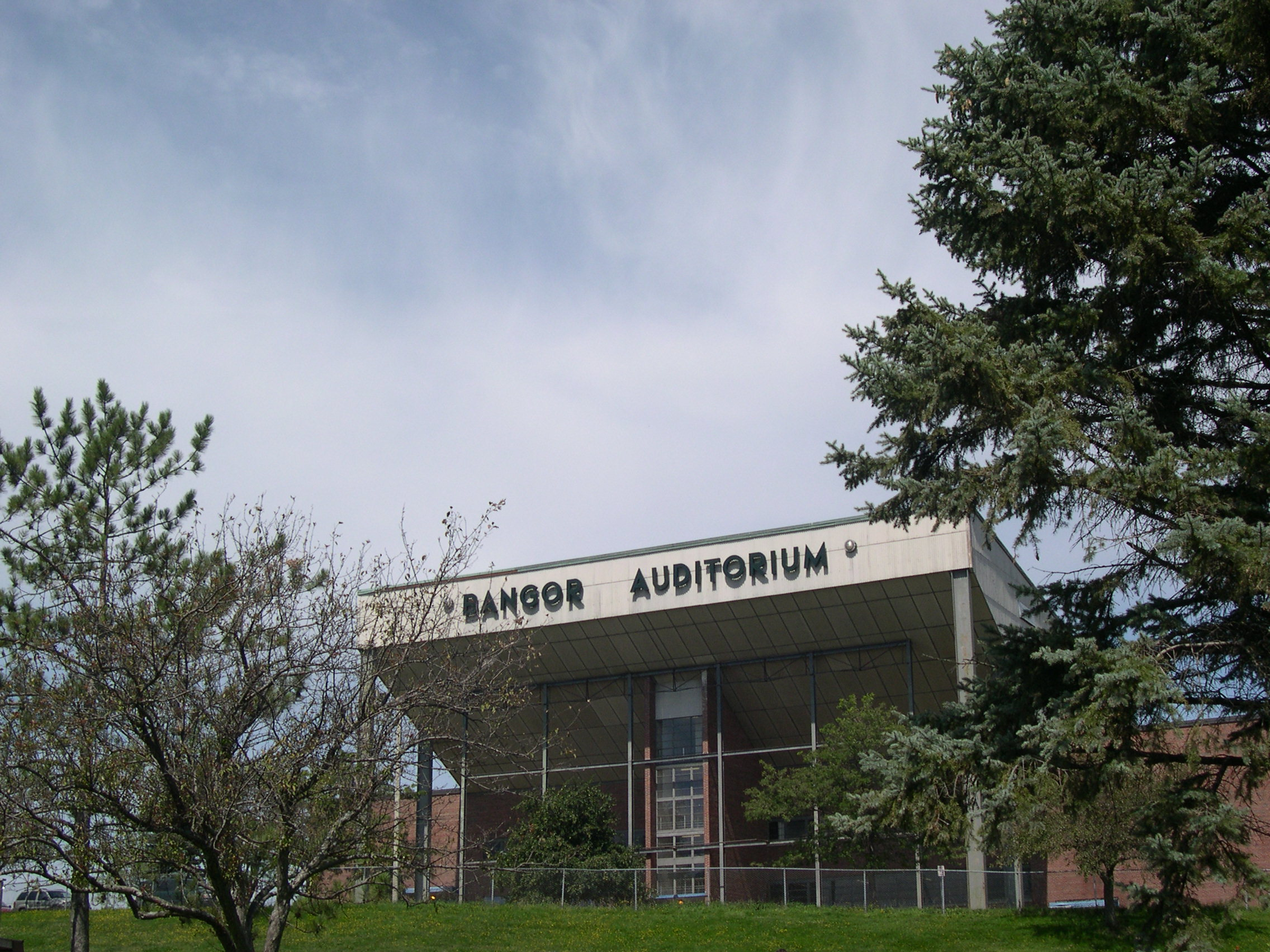
Gavin Turk, Bag, 2000

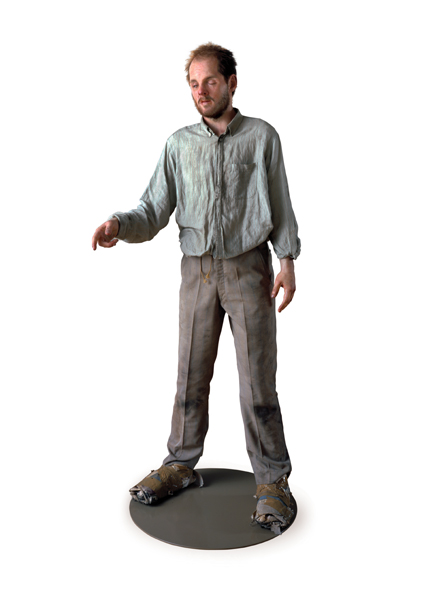
Gavin Turk, Bum, 1998

Turk has exhibited widely internationally. His solo exhibitions include 'L'Amour Fou', David Nolan Gallery, New York City (2013), 'Türk', Galerist, Istanbul, Turkey (2012), 'Gavin & Turk', Ben Brown Gallery, London (2013), 'Jack Shit!', Aeroplastics, Brussels, Belgium (2011), 'Before The World Was Round', Galerie Krinzinger, Vienna, Austria (2011) and 'En Face', Galerie Almine Rech, Paris, France (2010), 'The Mirror Stage', Goodman Gallery, Cape Town, South Africa (2009), 'Burnt Out', Kunsthaus Baselland, Basel, Switzerland (2008), 'Piss Off', Galerie Krinzinger, Vienna, Austria (2008) and 'Negotiation of Purpose', GEM Museum for Contemporary Art, The Hague, Netherlands (2007). Additionally, Turk has had solo exhibitions at Sean Kelly Gallery, New York (2005), the New Art Centre Sculpture Park and Gallery, Salisbury, England (2003), the New Art Gallery in Walsall, England (2002), and "The Stuff Show" at South London Gallery (1998).

Recent group exhibitions include 'Street', New Art gallery Walsall (2012), 'Made in Britain: Contemporary Art from the British Council Collection', Sichuan (2012), 'Deja-vu? The Art of Copying from Dürer to You Tube', Staatliche Kunsthalle Karlsruhe, Germany (2012), 'Twenty', Aurel Scheibler, Berlin, Germany (2012), 'The Art of Chess', Bendigo Gallery; University of Queensland Art Museum, Australia (2012), 'Identity Theft', Mimmo scognamiglio Arte Contemporanea, Milan, Italy (2010), 'Pop Life: Art in a Material World', Tate Modern, London (2009), 'The Third Dimension, Whitechapel Art Gallery', London (2009), 'DLA Piper Series: This is Sculpture', Tate Liverpool, Liverpool (2009), Turk has also been involved in "teach-in" events such as "The Che Gavara [sic] Story" (2001).

== Politics ==
In August 2014, Turk was one of 200 public figures who were signatories to a letter to The Guardian expressing their hope that Scotland would vote to remain part of the United Kingdom in September's referendum on that issue.

In November 2018, Turk was one of 82 people arrested during a coordinated occupation of five bridges in Central London. The demonstration which was co-ordinated by Extinction Rebellion, was to raise the awareness of climate change. Turk said, "It seems like everyone is in an odd sense of denial about climate change."

== The House of Fairy Tales ==
In 2007 Turk established, with his partner Deborah Curtis, The House of Fairy Tales, a children's arts charity based in London, that brings together hundreds of artists, performers, actors, writers and philosophers to deliver theatrical events, guides and exhibitions. The project continues to further community education projects based around, supported by, and advocating art. The House of Fairy Tales tour the country in a mobile gallery horse box which made its festival debut at the 2008 Crunch Festival in Hay-on-Wye. In 2009, they appeared at the Glastonbury Festival. In the summer of 2009, The House of Fairy Tales also staged The Long Weekend, a pop-up festival for all ages, hosted by Tate Modern.

== Awards ==
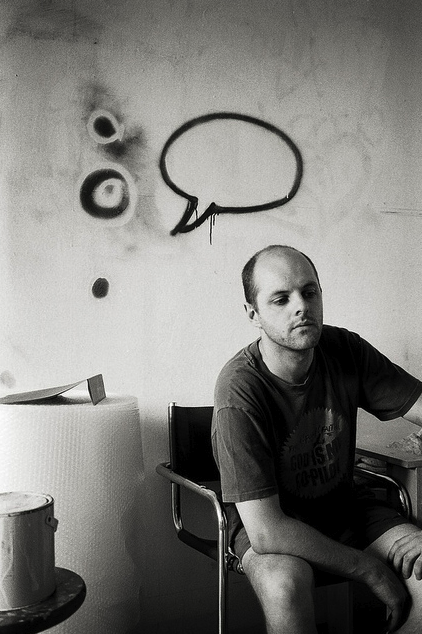
Gavin Turk in 2001

In 2001, Turk was awarded the Jack Goldhill Sculpture Prize for his work Bag (2000) by the Royal Academy of Arts, London, who in 2007 also awarded him the Charles Wollaston award for his work Dumb Candle (2007), a carving of a candle made from the top of an old broom handle.

== Professorship ==
Turk was awarded an honorary doctorate in Arts, University of East London in 2010. He held the post of professor of Art and Design 2012–2020 at Bath Spa University.
