= Norman Balon =

British pub landlord (1927–2026)

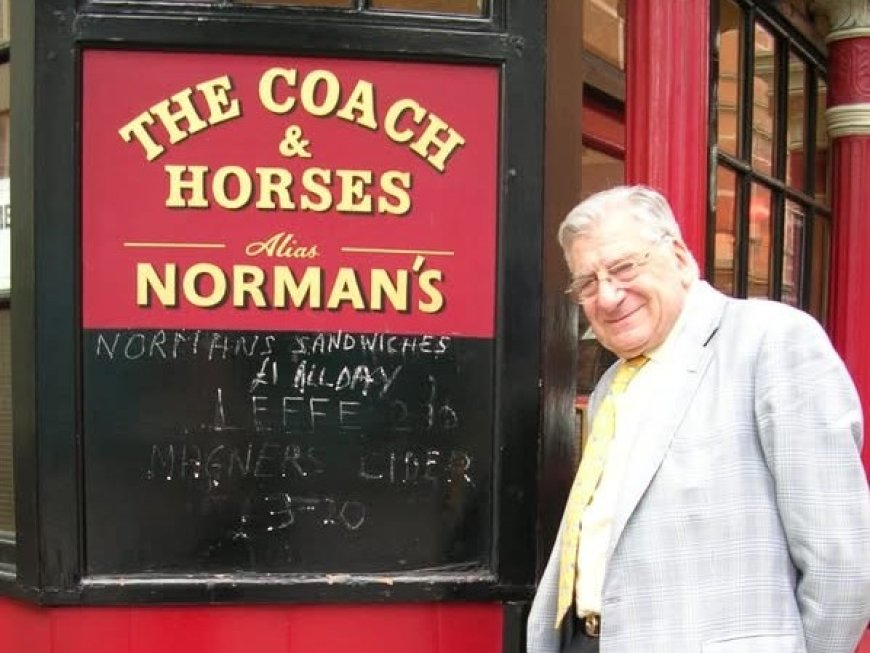
- Balon outside the Coach and Horses on his retirement day, May 2006
- Born: 13 January 1927; Ilford, Essex, England
- Died: 4 June 2026 (aged 99); Temple Fortune, London, England
- Resting place: Golders Green Crematorium, London, England
- Education: Hendon Technical College
- Occupation: Publican
- Known for: Landlord of the Coach and Horses, Soho

Norman Balon (13 January 1927 – 4 June 2026) was a British publican who was the long-serving tenant landlord of the Coach and Horses pub in Soho, London. He was known as London's rudest landlord, served in the pub for 63 years, and acquired an eclectic cast of regular customers. Balon became closely associated with journalists working for Private Eye and The Spectator, including Jeffrey Bernard.

Both publications made regular mention of Balon, increasing his notoriety. He was landlord to a long list of actors, artists and writers, in addition to the prostitutes, alcoholics and gangsters that were part of Soho's social fabric. Balon featured in two plays based on the Coach and Horses, including Jeffrey Bernard Is Unwell.

== Early years ==
Norman Balon was born on 13 January 1927 in Ilford, then part of Essex, into a Jewish family, though he was to become a lifelong atheist. He had three siblings, through his parents Jack and Anne (known as Annie) Balon. His parents ran two kosher hotels in Bournemouth, where Balon spent his childhood. His father was previously a loss adjuster and financial speculator. In 1940 the family moved to Temple Fortune in London, and Balon attended Hendon Technical College.

On 3 February 1943, during the middle of World War II, his parents took over the tenancy of the Coach and Horses. Balon, who was 16 years old, dropped out of college to work at the pub, and stayed there until May 2006, when he was 79. Balon became the nominal landlord when his father accepted a job as a fire inspector, at which point he became teetotal for the rest of his life. He became the licensed victualler of the Coach and Horses in 1965, with the retirement of his father.

== Landlord of the Coach and Horses ==
Balon revelled in his title as "the Rudest Landlord in London". There is a tradition of curmudgeonly landlords in British pubs, and Muriel Belcher and Ian Board at the nearby Colony Room upheld this distinct form of customer relations. Being "barred" – banned from the pub – is the landlord's discretionary power to get rid of unwanted clients. Balon's autobiography, which he claimed not to have read, had the title You're barred, you bastards!, though few would have got off that lightly. "Fuck off, you cunt" would be a more traditional valediction for the many who incurred his displeasure.

Even his elderly mother was apparently not exempt: he barred her as he felt her boring and past it. The banishment was normally short term, and the recidivists were usually allowed to slink back into the Coach and Horses, albeit with Balon rolling his eyes, after a few days' exile. Writer Nicholas Lezard, who once lived in the Coach and Horses, said of him: "He was very much the Hebrew Bible divinity: the ultimate authority who could not always be understood."

The Coach and Horses is located on Greek Street in Soho, close to theatreland, Saint Martin's School of Art, and later on, the offices of Private Eye and The Oldie magazines. In the early days of Balon's life at the pub the area was known for criminal gangs, shoplifters, prostitutes, corrupt police officers and sex shops. Over the years it changed into a more mainstream part of London. "Soho in the old days was a bank manager's day out, a place where people came for a touch of naughtiness," Balon said. "Soho should exist on prostitutes, artists, homosexuals and lesbians, but Westminster Council has sanitised the area, which has caused huge damage."

Private Eye's use of the Coach and Horses as its watering hole led to the pub hosting a fortnightly lunch on the first floor, to which the leading lights of politics, trade unionism and the arts would be invited. Balon got on well with Margaret Thatcher and Danny La Rue, rather less well with the anti-monarchist member of parliament Willie Hamilton, and Balon called the Labour Party leader Neil Kinnock a "has been" to his face. He also enjoyed the company of Private Eye's own journalists such as Richard Ingrams, Willie Rushton and Peter Cook. Actors, writers and artists were also regulars, with Tom Baker, Dylan Thomas, Lucian Freud, Frank Auerbach and Francis Bacon among his customers.

The Coach and Horses thrived off the attention, with its famous drinkers attracting ever more packed sessions in the pub. Balon later said because he did well, financially, from the pub's success, this allowed him to endeavour to moderate the drinking of some of his regulars.

When he retired in May 2006 he was sent off with a chorus of "For He's a Jolly Good Fellow", there were no free drinks, and all three of the beers on tap were off.

== Representation in theatre and literature ==
Balon was represented in Keith Waterhouse's successful play Jeffrey Bernard is Unwell, though more by his absence. The play's plot revolves around Jeffrey Bernard falling asleep in the Coach and Horses, and then wakes up to discover that he had been locked in overnight. Bernard then calls out for Balon to rescue him, but he had long left for home. The play was launched with Peter O'Toole in the lead role.

Jeffrey Bernard often referred to Balon in his theoretically weekly column in The Spectator, called "Low Life", in which he extolled the pain and pleasure of life as a professional alcoholic. Bernard occupied a particular stool at the end of the bar and the pub was in effect his second home. Michael Heath depicted Balon in cartoons for Private Eye and The Oldie.

Balon was the star of a one-off play, It's All True, staged at the Shaftesbury Theatre in January 2023. The artist Rupert Shrive, who was offered a studio on the third floor of the pub by Balon, depicted the landlord and many of his regular customers, in a painting presented on his retirement.

== Personal life ==
Balon married twice. His first wife was Suzanne (née Spero), whom he married shortly after her 18th birthday, in September 1962, at the West London Synagogue. She worked as a chef at the pub, and was the mother of his two daughters. He was devastated when the marriage ended in divorce in 1982.

He met Grazia Wieder (née Meggiolaro), a translator from Venice, while playing bridge in 1985. Their initial meeting did not go well. She was so infuriated by his tactics that she threw her cards into Balon's face. Undeterred, he invited her to a forthcoming theatre first night of Richard III at the Barbican, with Antony Sher in the title role, at that point the hottest ticket in town. They stayed together from then on and were married in 2007.

Going to first night openings of plays in London was one of Balon's passions. He would turn out smartly dressed in a tailor-made suit, with a box of mint chocolates from a leading brand such as Fortnum and Mason, though these were varied, due to Balon falling out with several suppliers over the years.

Balon's reputation for rudeness was tempered by his concealed kindness. In the case of Jeffrey Bernard, Balon preferred him to be in the Coach and Horses where someone could keep an eye on the journalist, rather than somewhere else which might not care about him. When Bernard became increasingly ill, and lost mobility, Balon would take lobster salad to his flat nearby, and visit him in hospital. There was a more complex side to Balon's personality, where the publican demonstrated his commitment to those who made up Soho's community with quiet acts of loyalty.

== Later life and death ==
Balon continued to be active until his mid-90s, navigating the Tube from his Temple Fortune home down to the Coach and Horses for interviews, meeting old friends and visits to Maison Bertaux. He died on 4 June 2026, aged 99.

== Legacy ==
Writing in Private Eye after Balon's death, the former editor Richard Ingrams said that Balon was a key figure in the Private Eye story and as an unofficial member of staff he contributed to the publication's success. "He played up to his reputation for being London's rudest landlord, but behind that façade he was a kind and very generous man."
