= Three Studies for a Portrait of Muriel Belcher =

1966 painting by Francis Bacon

Three Studies of Muriel Belcher, 1966, 35.5 x 30.5cm. Private collection

Three Studies for a portrait of Muriel Belcher is an oil-on-canvas triptych painting by the Irish born English artist Francis Bacon, completed in 1966. It portrays Muriel Belcher, described by musician George Melly as a "benevolent witch", and the charismatic founder and proprietress of The Colony Room Club, a private drinking house at 41 Dean Street, Soho, London, where Bacon was a regular throughout the late 1940s to late 1960s.

The two became friends soon after she opened the club in 1948, and Bacon helped her cultivate its reputation as a seedy but convivial meeting place for artists, writers, musicians, homosexuals and bohemians. At its height, regular patrons included Lucian Freud, Jeffrey Bernard, John Deakin and Henrietta Moraes.

Belcher died in 1979. Having been exhibited at Tate, London, and Galeries nationales du Grand Palais, Paris, The triptych is in a private collection.

== Model ==
Both Belcher and Bacon shared a sharp, dry and caustic wit, which bordered on sarcastic and aloof disdain. They cultivated an at times intimidating atmosphere, and she became the subject of several of his paintings, including Seated Woman (Portrait of Muriel Belcher), which in sold 2007 for €13.7 million. Bacon did not paint from life sittings, and it is likely that he painted this triptych from photographs taken by Deakin.

== Description ==
Each of the panels is set against a flat, dark and nondescript background. The portraits capture Belcher's personality, expressed through her flowing hair, arched eyebrows and prominent nose. From left to right, the panels show her in half profile looking to the viewer's right, in full profile, and in half profile looking to our left, in a sequence that evokes a sense of movement akin to the photographs of Eadweard Muybridge or police mug shots. Her facial features are heavily distorted in each, an effect achieved by long and wider brush strokes. Bacon uses contrasting colour palettes to change the tone and the mood of the panels; the fiery and aggressive reds of the centre portrait contrast with the calmer blue-grey tones of the right-hand image. The triptych follows in a pattern of panels painted of close friends in a similar distorted style during the late 1960s and very early 1970s.

== See also ==
- List of paintings by Francis Bacon

== Sources ==
- Muir, Robin. A Maverick Eye: The Street Photography of John Deakin. London: Thames & Hudson, 2002. ISBN 0-500-54244-9
- Farr, Dennis; Peppiatt, Michael; Yard, Sally. Francis Bacon: A Retrospective. New York: Harry N Abrams, 1999. ISBN 0-8109-2925-2
- Ficacci, Luigi. Francis Bacon: 1909–1992. London: Taschen, 2003. ISBN 978-3-8228-2198-5
