= Sophie Parkin =

British writer and artist (born 1961)

- Born: 6 June 1961 (age 65); London, England
- Education: Saint Martin's School of Art; Leeds Polytechnic; Anthony Earnshaw, then Maidstone College of Art
- Occupations: Writer, artist
- Known for: Proprietor of Vout-O-Reenee's
- Notable work: The Colony Room Club 1948–2008: A History of Bohemian Soho
- Spouse: J. W. Vink (2009–2017)
- Parent(s): Molly Parkin and Michael Parkin

Sophie Parkin (born 6 June 1961) is an English writer, artist and poet. She was previously the proprietor of an arts club in East London, Vout-O-Reenee's, opened in 2014: Vout-O-Reenee's. She left in 2023.

== Biography ==
Born in London in 1961, Sophie Parkin was schooled at Redcliffe School, Oxford Gardens Primary School, Burlington Grammar School in West London, Frensham Heights Boarding School, Surrey, then Camborne School of Mines, near Redruth, Cornwall. She went on to attend Saint Martin's School of Art, Leeds Polytechnic (tutored by Jeff Nuttall) and Anthony Earnshaw, then Maidstone College of Art, where she graduated with a Fine Art degree in 1982.

As a child, Parkin starred in many commercials, including for Wall's sausages, Comfort fabric conditioner and as the Dulux girl. She also modelled in Nova magazine and The Sunday Times and appeared in Andrew Logan’s Alternative Miss World in 1979 film. She has also appeared in film, such as the Dylan Thomas biopic The Edge of Love, directed by John Maybury and starring Keira Knightley, Sienna Miller and Matthew Rhys. As a present on her 18th birthday, her parents gave her membership to the Chelsea Arts Club and The Colony Rooms in Soho, and she went on to work in or manage several high-profile clubs and bars.

=== Literary career ===
Parkin has regularly written for British newspapers and periodicals, and appeared on television and radio as a broadcaster – on Woman's Hour on BBC Radio 4. She wrote regularly for 3:AM Magazine. She has also written for The Guardian, The Independent, The Daily Mail, The Times, The Lady magazine, Tatler, Harper's, Bonham's Magazine and the British Library. She has written obituaries in national British newspapers on Sylvia Scaffardi, Martha Hill and Dick Bradsell. She also taught creative writing at Morley College, London, for three years.

Her novels are All Grown Up (1998), Take Me Home (1999) and Dear Goddess (2000). She has also written for Piccadilly Press the teen novels French for Kissing (2005), Best of Friends (2006), and Mad, Rich and Famous (2006). Other writings by her appear in the collections Mothers by Daughters (1995), Sons and Mothers (1997), Girls Just Want To Have Fun: the Cosmopolitan book of short stories, Best of Friends (which she also edited), and POT 05 – Anthology of Poetry (edited by Michael Horovitz). In 2012, she published The Colony Room Club 1948–2008: A History of Bohemian Soho. A history of Soho's The Colony Room Club, it was the book choice of her mother Molly Parkin as a castaway on the BBC Radio 4 programme Desert Island Discs.

=== Vout-O-Reenee's ===
In May 2014, Parkin opened Vout-O-Reenee's near Shoreditch, east London, an arts club that has been described as "a private members club for the surrealistically distinguished", encompassing The Stash Gallery. The intention had been to open the club with barman and friend Dick Bradsell; however, he became ill with a brain tumour and died in 2016. The name of the club is based on jazz musician Slim Gaillard's dictionary of Jive slang.

The Stash Gallery, which is open to the public, shows contemporary living artists, with recent exhibits including film producer Sandy Lieberson's collection of art photography and movie memorabilia (24 November 2021 – 25 January 2022), and, in spring 2022, 147 Women Dinner Party by Sophie Parkin and Mandee Gage, "an installation about women who should be better remembered, for how they have been instrumental in making and changing Britain". The private members club is painted by artists Tony Common, Morganico and Keeler&Tonero as a surrealistic wonderland. It was designed by Susan Dalgleish and Parkin. It is open to non-members when ticketed events occur.

== Personal life ==
She is the sister of Sarah Lieberson and Zuleika Gerrish, and daughter of artist Molly Parkin and art dealer Michael Parkin. Her godmother was Sylvia Scaffardi, co-founder of the National Council for Civil Liberties (later known as Liberty). Parkin was formerly married to Jan Vink. She has a son, Cameron (1987) and a daughter, Carson Parkin-Fairley.

== Bibliography ==
- All Grown Up (1998)
- Take Me Home (1999)
- Dear Goddess (2000)
- French for Kissing (Piccadilly Press, 2005)
- Best of Friends (Piccadilly Press, 2006)
- Mad, Rich and Famous (Piccadilly Press, 2006)
- Bazaar Nights and Camel Bites (Piccadilly Press, 2007)
- The Colony Room Club 1948–2008 (2012)
- The Colony Room Club 1948-2008 a history of bohemian Soho (Palmtree pub, 2013)

=== Selected book contributions ===
- "My mother, my self", in Mothers by Daughters, edited by Joanna Goldsworthy (Virago Press, 1995, ISBN 9781853817939)
- Sons and Mothers, edited by Victoria Glendinning and Matthew Glendinning (Virago, 1997, ISBN 9781860493553)
