= Michael Wojas =

English nightclub owner

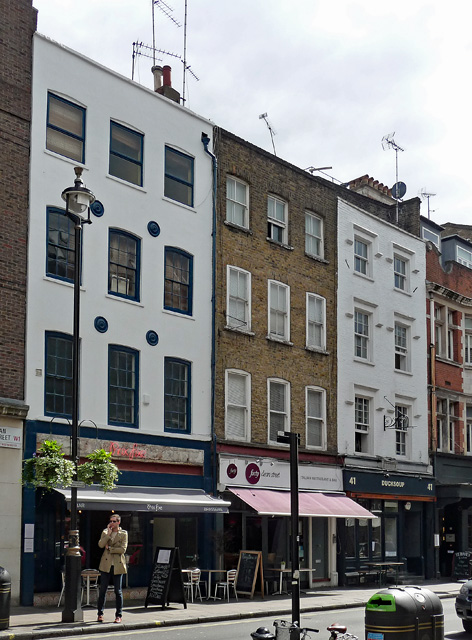
The Colony Room Club was located at 41 Dean Street, in the white property on the right

Michael Wojas (9 August 1956 – 6 June 2010) was an English nightclub owner who ran The Colony Room Club in Dean Street in London's Soho district, from 1994 until he closed it in 2007, having inherited it from Ian Board who took it over from Muriel Belcher, who founded the private drinking club in 1948.

== Early life ==
Wojas was born in London on 9 August 1956. He was educated at Haberdashers' Aske's Boys' School, Hertfordshire, and graduated in 1981 from the University of Nottingham with a degree in chemistry.

== The Colony ==
Wojas worked at The Colony Room Club as a barman and "Board's sidekick" for 13 years, and was bequeathed the club by Board at his 1994 death. He attracted a new generation of artists to the Colony including Young British Artists such as Damien Hirst, Tracey Emin and Sarah Lucas, singer Lisa Stansfield and fashion designer Pam Hogg.

In 1997, the film-maker John Maybury directed Love Is the Devil: Study for a Portrait of Francis Bacon a biopic of the life of Colony regular Francis Bacon, starring Derek Jacobi as Bacon, with Colony sequences shot in the club itself. The club was too small, so an exact replica was created in a film studio, with Wojas as an extra. Wojas brought numerous old-time members to appear as extras. When Jacobi appeared, several inebriated habituees thought he was Bacon, and Wojas had to convince them, "It isn't Francis because Francis is dead, and this isn't the Colony Room".

In 2007, the Colony's lease expired, and in deteriorating health, Wojas closed it, and auctioned the artwork, including a large painting by Michael Andrews. The closure and auction led to a bitter legal battle with several of the regular members. Wojas was diagnosed with cancer soon after. In his last year, he gave up smoking and drinking.

== Death ==
Wojas' humanist funeral took place at Kensal Green Crematorium on 16 June 2010, accompanied by the band Alabama 3 and more than 300 mourners. His home-made cardboard coffin was too wide to pass through the portal. He was survived by his mother.
