= The Colony Room Club =

Private members' drinking club in Soho, London (1948–2008)

Coordinates: 51.5133°N 0.1322°W

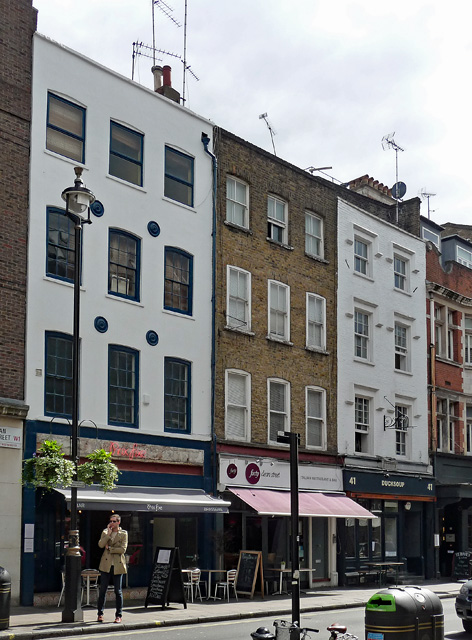
The Colony Room Club was located at 41 Dean Street, in the white property on the right

The Colony Room Club was a private members' drinking club at 41 Dean Street, Soho, London. It was founded and presided over by Muriel Belcher from its inception in 1948 until her death in 1979.

The artist Francis Bacon was a founder and lifelong member, and the club attracted a mixture of Soho's low-lifes and its alcoholic, artistic elite, including George Melly, Jeffrey Bernard and Lucian Freud. Visiting non-members included many names from aristocratic, political and artistic circles, including Princess Margaret, William Burroughs, David Bowie and Henri Cartier-Bresson. The club attracted the Young British Artists in the 1990s.

== 1948–1979 Muriel Belcher ==
In 1948, Muriel Belcher secured a 3pm-to-11pm drinking licence for The Colony Room Club as a private members club (public houses had to close at 2.30pm). The room was operated by Belcher from that year until her death in 1979.

Francis Bacon was a founding member, walking in the day after it opened. He was "adopted" by Belcher who called him "Daughter", and gave him free drinks and £10 a week to bring in friends and rich patrons.

The club was located in a tiny first-floor room in Dean Street, Soho, and was notorious for its decor as well as its clientele. Originally smartly decorated in a colonial style, it was repainted in the 1950s; its green walls became famous. Members described the staircase that led to the establishment as foul-smelling and flanked by dustbins, and talked of "going up the dirty stairs".

The club played an important role in Soho society. Members in Belcher's time also included Daniel Farson; Michael Andrews; John Deakin; and Henrietta Moraes, whose portrait by Bacon sold for £21.3 million in February 2012.

Belcher's open attitude towards sexuality attracted many gay men to the club, many of them brought there by her Jamaican girlfriend, Carmel. Belcher had a knack for attracting or discovering interesting and colourful people, and the patronage of men such as George Melly and Francis Bacon helped to establish the Colony Room Club's close-knit community. Bacon's friend Lady Rose McLaren was a habituée of the club in her London days.

According to the Museum of London website, "The Colony Room was one of many drinking clubs in Soho. The autocratic and temperamental owner Muriel Belcher created an ambiance which suited those who thought of themselves as misfits or outsiders". Belcher has been described as "an imperious lesbian with a fondness for insulting banter". George Melly said of her, "Muriel was a benevolent witch, who managed to draw in all London's talent up those filthy stairs. She was like a great cook, working with the ingredients of people and drink. And she loved money."

== 1979–1994 Ian Board ==
After Belcher's death in 1979, the club was passed to her long-time barman Ian Board (known as "Ida"), who held it until his death in 1994. Brian Patten described the Colony Room Club as "a small urinal full of fractious old geezers bitching about each other". For Molly Parkin, the club was "a character-building glorious hellhole. Everyone left their careers at the roadside before clambering the stairs and plunging into questionable behaviour".

Clive Jennings says of regular clientele such as Jeffrey Bernard that "the lethal triangle of The French, The Coach & Horses and The Colony were the staging points of the Dean Street shuffle, with occasional forays into other joints such as The Gargoyle or the Mandrake ... The Groucho or Blacks".

== 1994–2008 Michael Wojas ==
The club then passed to Ian Board's barman Michael Wojas, whom he had employed since 1981. He had the club repainted in a "rather bilious green". It became a cultural magnet for the Young British Artists group (YBAs), including Damien Hirst, Sarah Lucas, Tracey Emin and Joshua Compston, as well as musicians such as Lisa Stansfield. As a promotional device, Wojas persuaded famous members, including Kate Moss and Sam Taylor-Wood to serve drinks from behind the bar. Hirst explained that the attraction of the club was "because artists like drinking".

== Closure ==
In 2008, Wojas announced that financial pressure would result in his not renewing the lease of the club, and it would have to close. He auctioned off some works of art, including a large Michael Andrews painting, which Wojas argued were under his control. The sale raised £40,000. Wojas's actions triggered furious opposition from some members who believed that the assets belonged to the members, and took Wojas to court to freeze the proceeds of the auction. A new governing committee was elected, amidst scenes of conflict between pro- and anti-Wojas factions.

A campaign to keep the club open was fronted by dandy and artist Sebastian Horsley, attempting to secure the use of the premises in the future. According to Horsley: "it has been a vibrant, unique and historical drinking den for artists, writers, musicians, actors and their acolytes. There is nowhere else like it in the world." He also said: "The Colony is a living work of art, it's a tragedy what's happening. From Bacon to Beckett, Rimbaud to Rotten, the Colony must not be forgotten."

Wojas kept the keys to the club and closed the Colony Room Club at the end of 2008. Dick Bradsell was working as barman at the time of closure.

In his epitaph for the Colony Room Club, novelist Will Self argued against the view that the closure demonstrated that "the old Soho is being killed off by smoking bans and other sanitising measures. The truth is that there was another criterion for membership: the hardcore members were first and foremost raging alcoholics."

== 2023: Colony Room Green ==
In 2023 the Colony Room Green was opened in the basement of 4 Heddon Street, just off Regent Street, claiming to be "a bold re-creation of the legendary Soho club", to significant national press coverage. Unlike the original Colony Room, it is open to the general public.

Live jazz is held Wednesday to Saturday and a rotating public art gallery continues the club's art tradition. Monthly book readings typically occur on Mondays. The crowd remains vibrant comprising many contemporary artists, writers, actors and musicians alongside past members including Darren Coffield the author of "Tales of the Colony Room" who curates the Club.

== Cultural depictions ==
- 1962: Michael Andrews painted Colony Room I, which depicted Muriel Belcher, Ian Board, Daniel Farson, Lucian Freud and Francis Bacon. The painting, on loan from Pallant House, was included in the exhibition All Too Human: Bacon, Freud and a Century of Painting Life at Tate Britain in 2018.
- 1994 The club is parodied in Stephen Fry's novel, "The Hippopotamus", as The Dominion Club, and Muriel Belcher as Mim Gunter.
- 1998: Bacon, Belcher and the club were featured in John Maybury's film Love Is the Devil: Study for a Portrait of Francis Bacon, in which Belcher was played by Tilda Swinton.
- 2008: A fictionalised version appeared in the first story ("Foie Humain") of Will Self's collection Liver.
- 2008: The club was used as the set/venue for the ITV show Suggs in the City.
- 2012: The Colony Room Club 1948–2008: A History of Bohemian Soho was written and published by Sophie Parkin.
- 2013: Harpers & Queen published Carla Borel's photo series Stillsoho, which included documentation of the club and its members such as Sebastian Horsley.
- 2013: The club was parodied as "The Colonial Club" in Matt Berry's Toast of London.
- 2018: The club under Ian Board was described in detail in Christopher Howse's Soho in the Eighties, published by Bloomsbury.
- 2018: Tales From The Colony: The Lost Bohemia of Bacon, Belcher & Board, was a history of the club based on interviews with former members, written by Darren Coffield.

The British Museum holds a collection of prints, Colony Room Suite, depicting Muriel Belcher, Francis Bacon and Ian Board, amongst other members of the club, made by the artist Michael Clark.

== Notable members ==
Well-known members of the Colony Room Club included:

- Jankel Adler
- Michael Andrews
- Kenneth Anger
- Frank Auerbach
- Francis Bacon
- Tom Baker
- George Barker
- Timothy Behrens
- Elinor Bellingham-Smith
- Bruce Bernard
- Jeffrey Bernard
- Lady Caroline Blackwood
- Peter Blake
- Isabella Blow
- Carla Borel
- Maurice Bowra
- Garech Browne
- Robert Carrier
- Patrick Caulfield
- Michael Clark
- Darren Coffield
- Robert Colquhoun
- Joshua Compston
- Keith Coventry
- Chris Dangerfield
- John Deakin
- Tom Driberg
- Paul Duane
- Denholm Elliott
- Michael Elphick
- Tracey Emin
- Sandy Fawkes
- Daniel Farson
- Barry Flanagan
- E. M. Forster
- Robert Fraser
- Lucian Freud
- Christian Furr
- Allan Hall
- Nina Hamnett
- Michael Heath
- Damien Hirst
- Christopher Hitchens
- Eric Hobsbawm
- Sebastian Horsley
- Trevor Howard
- Barry Humphries
- John Hurt
- Alex James
- Augustus John
- Christine Keeler
- Mary Kenny
- R. B. Kitaj
- Burt Kwouk
- Kit Lambert
- Jay Landesman
- Peter Langan
- Ben Langlands
- Sarah Lucas
- Robert MacBryde
- Colin MacInnes
- Lady Rose McLaren
- Louis MacNeice
- John McVicar
- John Maybury
- George Melly
- John Minton
- Henrietta Moraes
- Kate Moss
- Rodrigo Moynihan
- Tim Noble and Sue Webster
- Frank Norman
- Anne Pigalle
- Molly Parkin
- Thea Porter
- Cedric Price
- David Remfry
- Jo Self
- Will Self
- Elizabeth Smart
- Stephen Spender
- Lisa Stansfield
- Janet Street-Porter
- Joe Strummer
- David Sylvester
- Patrick Swift
- Dylan Thomas
- Gavin Turk
- Victor Lewis-Smith
- Keith Vaughan
