= Version No. 2 of Lying Figure with Hypodermic Syringe =

1968 painting by Francis Bacon

- Version No. 2 of Lying Figure with Hypodermic Syringe
- Artist: Francis Bacon
- Year: 1968
- Medium: Oil on canvas
- Dimensions: 197 cm × 147 cm (78 in × 58 in)
- Location: Private collection

Version No. 2 of Lying Figure with Hypodermic Syringe is a 1968 oil-on-canvas painting by the English artist Francis Bacon. It is the second of two similarly titled paintings based on nude photographs of his close friend Henrietta Moraes, who is shown in a reclining position on a bed, themselves part of a wider series of collapsed figures on beds that began with the 1963 triptych Lying Figure. This later version is widely considered the more successful of the two panels.

== Model ==
Moraes and Bacon were drinking friends, and she became his favourite model. He depicted her over a dozen times in a variety of forms, including single panel portraits, triptych portraits, and as part of larger scale figurations such as this painting They knew each other from Soho's Colony Club, where they often met with John Deakin, another close friend, and a photographer whom Bacon commission to take the photographs on which the painting is based.

== Description ==
Moraes was a noted beauty and an artist's model in 1960s London, who became a muse to Bacon, Lucian Freud and Maggi Hambling. Bacon was decidedly gay and did not often paint or show much interest in female nudes, although Deakin's original photographs are quite erotic, verging on voyeuristic and seedy. A few of Bacon's other incorporated influences, including Henry Fuseli's 1871 The Nightmare, which emphasises female sexuality and appeal—especially, according to Sotheby's, in the long hair and "thrown back arm, so eloquent of physical abandon".

Bacon's painting contains traces of these influences, but is more focused on inner turmoil and projection of his bleak, nihilistic, outlook. This is apparent in the contorted and unflattering manner in which he depicts his model, and most especially in the manner she is seemingly pinned to the bed by the hypodermic syringe.

Bacon was avowedly against melodrama and loaded meanings in his paintings, and for years seemed defensive in including such a direct utensil as a syringe. He instead saw the device as akin to the nails in a depiction of the crucifixion of Jesus, a particular obsession of his, and said "I've used the figures lying on beds with a hypodermic syringe as a form of nailing the image more strongly to reality or appearance. I don't put the syringe because of the drug that's being injected but because it's less stupid than putting a nail through the arm, which would be even more melodramatic." A bitter irony is that Moraes fell victim to heroin addiction from the 1970s.

The painting is similar in tone, form and theme to his 1967 Triptych Inspired by T.S. Eliot's Poem "Sweeney Agonistes", in which the central figure, also reclining, is reduced to a slab of flesh.

== See also ==
- List of paintings by Francis Bacon

== Sources ==
- Dawson, Barbara; Sylvester, David. Francis Bacon in Dublin. London: Thames & Hunson, 2000. ISBN 978-0-500-28254-0
- Farr, Dennis; Peppiatt, Michael; Yard, Sally. Francis Bacon: A Retrospective. New York: Harry N Abrams, 1999. ISBN 0-8109-2925-2
- Peppiatt, Michael. Anatomy of an Enigma. London: Westview Press, 1996. ISBN 0-8133-3520-5
- Russell, John. Francis Bacon. New York: Norton, 1971. ISBN 0-500-20169-2
- Sylvester, David. Looking back at Francis Bacon. London: Thames and Hudson, 2000. ISBN 0-500-01994-0
- van Alphen, Ernst. Francis Bacon and the Loss of Self. London: Reaktion Books, 1992. ISBN 0-948462-33-7
