= Wojas =

Wojas is a surname. Notable people with the surname include:

- Claire Wojas (1949–2018), Canadian screenwriter and film producer
- Michael Wojas (1956–2010), owner and proprietor of The Colony Room Club, London
- Pamela Smart (née Wojas, born 1967), American convicted criminal
