= Michael Clark (artist) =

- Born: April 1, 1954 (age 71); Manchester
- Website: http://www.michaelclark.info/

Michael Clark (born 1 April 1954) is a contemporary British artist. His work spans a broad range of media including painting, drawing, sculpture, film, photography, installation, video, performance and artist's books. Clark was born in Manchester and lives and works in London.

== Life and work ==
In 1977 Clark met Muriel Belcher and Francis Bacon in The Colony Room club in Soho. Clark's portrait of Belcher on her deathbed (Muriel Belcher Ill in bed) was part of the Royal Academy Summer Exhibition in 1981, and won the Charles Wollaston Award. At the suggestion of Valerie Beston, of Marlborough Fine Art, Clark made the first of a series of portraits of Bacon, one of which is in the British Museum's collection. "Michael Clark's portraits of Bacon emphasise the sad preoccupation of his sagging face, with eyes deep in concussed hollows grimly contemplating mortality".

Vanitas (1990-1992), Clark's double-sided portrait of Lisa Stansfield, was part of The Portrait Now exhibition held from 1993–1994 at the National Portrait Gallery. "Both the theme of the wound and the title 'Vanitas' make references to mortality. Clark was partly inspired by a Renaissance painting — also double-sided — by Barthel Bruyn the Elder." Since 1994, Clark's Five Wounds have been on permanent display at Chichester Cathedral, alongside works by Graham Sutherland, John Piper and Marc Chagall.

"In some the glaze is so heavy that their raised and gleaming beads of crimson appear to flow. In others pieces of yellow 'bone' seem to rise beneath the skin. Any initial revulsion soon gives way to enchantment. [...] In the Wounds the viewer comes face to face with the very real nature of Christ's suffering and consequently with our own mortality. 'These works are forms to meditate upon' explains the artist. 'A trigger-release mechanism; a way of opening up.'"

Maria Balshaw, director of the Tate, listed Clark's portrait of filmmaker Derek Jarman, The Gardener (1994), as one of her favourite works in the collection of the Whitworth Art Gallery. “Michael Clark drew the film-maker towards the end of his life, when he was a man facing sickness and death. The drawing has a distinct and immediate impact, foregrounding as it does the quality of personal courage of the sitter. You are powerfully drawn to the face, you have a sense that the sitter trusted the artist to see into the eyes, to do much more than observe …” After purchasing Seer (1993), a grisaille portrait of Derek Jarman, in 1995, the National Portrait Gallery commissioned Clark, in 1999, to make a portrait of the filmmaker Nicolas Roeg. Clark delivered Al-Jebr, a kinetic assemblage made of mixed media portraying Roeg, which in Arabic means 'the bringing together of broken parts'. The art collection of Valerie Beston was sold at Christie's in February 2006 and included ten works by Clark. The accompanying catalogue stated:

"Bacon’s influence threads through his [Clark's] works, reappearing even in his conceptual pieces. Be it in the appearance of wounds in his paintings, or in the location of a ‘sound sculpture’ outside a sex shop that Bacon used to frequent (only in part to cash his cheques), his ghostly spectre appears again and again, if only obliquely, in his figurative and conceptual works. For Clark is not a portraitist, although he has created many portraits of people ranging from film directors to the characters of Soho of yesterday to Royalty to Pop royalty. He is a conceptual artist, for whom the painstakingly accurate depiction of the human face is only one of his means or media, and conversation with him ranges from the diverse influences of Rimbaud and Nauman as well as Holbein and Rembrandt."

In his book, Francis Bacon in Your Blood, art historian Michael Peppiatt writes:

"A feature article came out a while ago in the Observer in which the author, Peter Conrad, interviewed three men who had been close to Francis Bacon in their youth. He described each of them as having been 'burnt' for life by their contact with the painter. The implication was that you did not survive the influence of a genius as dark and powerful as Bacon. The three men were the photographer Peter Beard, the artist Michael Clark, and myself."

== Selection of works ==
- Muriel Belcher Ill in bed (1978-80). Oil on canvas. Private collection.
- Reece Mews interior London (1982). Mixed media. Collection Museum of London.
- Study for Reece Mews Interior (Francis Bacon's studio) (1982-3). Pencil, acrylic, watercolour, ink and pastel on paper. 20.9 cm x 9.8 cm. Victoria and Albert Museum.
- Francis Bacon (early 1980s). Pencil on paper. British Museum.
- Francis Bacon (1984-5). Oil on canvas. Private collection, formally in the collection of the late Valerie Beston.
- Colony Room Suite (1988). Photomechanical prints. British Museum.
- Untitled Wound (1990-1991). Oil on calico. Victoria and Albert Museum.
- Wounds of Love (early 1990s). Mixed media including hypodermic needles and stainless steel ring on paper. British Museum.
- Vanitas, Portrait of Lisa Stansfield (1990-1992). Oil on canvas with ecclesiastical velvet. Private collection.
- Seer, Portrait of Derek Jarman (1993). Oil on card. 451 mm x 333 mm. National Portrait Gallery.
- The Gardener, Portrait of Derek Jarman (1994). Mixed media on paper with botanical specimens. Whitworth Art Gallery.
- Five Wounds (1994). Oil on card mounted on wood. On permanent display at Chichester Cathedral.
- Geometry Of Healing (1995). Site-specific sculpture. St. James's Church, 197 Piccadilly, London W1, June - July 1995.
- Al-Jebr, Portrait of Nicolas Roeg (1999). Kinetic assemblage commissioned by the National Portrait Gallery. Mixed media including, oil on canvas, human hair, hypodermic needles, lead, gold leaf, meteorite, glass, beeswax and bee. 508 mm high. National Portrait Gallery.
- 10:07-09 (2002). Site-specific digital projection onto the great west door of Winchester Cathedral during Holy week.
- Drawing Breath (2002). Site-specific sound sculpture. Janus, 40 Old Compton Street, Soho, London.
- Every Man and Every Woman is a Star (2008-2009). Diamonds, silver, meteorite. Height: 184 mm total height from top of square to base of rod, Width: 57 mm square, Depth: 9 mm. Victoria and Albert Museum.
- Beautiful Dreamer: Perhaps Eye Sleep and Dream U (2009). Video, 14', colour with sound.

== Selected public collections ==
- British Museum
- National Portrait Gallery
- Whitworth Art Gallery
- Royal Collection Trust
- Museum of London
- Royal Society of Arts
- Pallant House Gallery
- Chichester Cathedral
- Victoria and Albert Museum
- Dublin City Gallery The Hugh Lane
