= Coach and Horses, Soho =

Listed pub in London, England

The Coach and Horses
- The pub in 2014

- Location within Central London
- Former names: Norman's; Normans

General information
- Type: Public house
- Location: 29 Greek Street, Soho, London, England
- Coordinates: 51°30′47.6″N 0°07′48.8″W
- Year built: c. 1840; 186 years ago
- Renovated: 1889 (substantially altered); 1930s (remodelled)
- Owner: Fuller, Smith & Turner

Design and construction
- Designations

Listed Building – Grade II
- Official name: Coach and Horses
- Designated: 23 November 1978
- Reference no.: 1235282

Website
- coachandhorsessoho.pub

The Coach and Horses is a Grade II listed public house on the corner of Greek Street and Romilly Street in Soho, London, England. The present building dates from about 1840, although a licensed premises has occupied the site since at least 1724. Altered in 1889 and remodelled internally in the 1930s, it retains an interior of "outstanding national historic importance" recognised by the Campaign for Real Ale (CAMRA). The pub is also known for its association with landlord Norman Balon, journalist Jeffrey Bernard and the magazine Private Eye.

== History ==
The building is a public house dating from about 1840, built on the site of an earlier inn of the same name. A licence for the Coach and Horses is recorded on Greek Street from 1724, indicating that the site's history as a pub extends back to at least the early 18th century. The building was substantially altered in 1889 and its interior was remodelled in the 1930s.

=== 20th century ===
In the 20th century, the landlord for over 60 years was Norman Balon (1927–2026), who developed a persona as "London's rudest landlord". He began to work at the pub in 1943, when he left an engineering course to serve at the bar, after his father became the landlord there.

On 23 November 1978, the Coach and Horses was designated a Grade II listed building. The pub is regarded by the Campaign for Real Ale (CAMRA) as having an interior of "outstanding national historic importance" and is rated three stars on its National Inventory of Historic Pub Interiors.

The pub became a favourite drinking spot for the journalists of the satirical magazine Private Eye and the location of their fortnightly lunches, at which it was hoped a plentiful supply of cheap wine would prompt an indiscretion from one of the guests, such as Member of Parliament John Hemming's admission that he had got his mistress pregnant. It also featured regularly in The Spectator's "Low Life" column by Jeffrey Bernard, who was a regular at the pub until his death in 1997.

In 1989, the interior of the pub was recreated on stage for the biographical play about Bernard, Jeffrey Bernard Is Unwell. The play was successful, and Balon's memoirs followed in 1991, titled You're Barred, You Bastards: The Memoirs of a Soho Publican.

Clive Jennings says of regular clientele such as Bernard that "the lethal triangle of The French, the Coach and Horses and The Colony were the staging points of the Dean Street shuffle, with occasional forays into other joints such as The Gargoyle or the Mandrake ... The Groucho or Blacks".

=== 21st century ===
Balon was succeeded as leaseholder in May 2006 by Alastair Choat, Greg Stewart, and Melanie Krudy. Fuller, Smith & Turner, then still a combined London brewery and pub group, bought the pub in a well-publicised acquisition, though continued to lease it to the existing tenants. In 2019, Fuller's ended the lease and transferred the pub into its managed estate. As of January 2024, there are two other pubs in the Soho district of London also using the name "Coach and Horses".

== Architecture ==
=== Exterior ===
The building occupies a prominent corner site, with a curved, recessed corner. It rises three storeys above the ground floor and has rendered elevations facing both Greek Street and Romilly Street. The upper floors are lit by sash windows set within decorative surrounds, while a parapet conceals much of the roof and chimney stacks. The curved corner carries a signboard added later in the 20th century, and further hanging and painted signs display the Canon Brewery emblem and the name "Norman's", commemorating the long-serving landlord Norman Balon.

The ground floor is distinguished by a frontage set slightly back from the street behind a row of 12 cast-iron columns. These stand in front of multi-paned windows and four separate entrances to the bar areas. Cream-tiled panels run beneath the windows between the entrances, some of which retain lettering in their glazed doors.

=== Interior ===
The interior in 2025

The interior was largely refitted in the second half of the 1930s, probably by Taylor Walker & Co. The three bar rooms retain wall panelling of that period, together with matching dividing screens, although the original screen doors have been removed to create a more open arrangement. The long servery survives with its original tapered counter, shelving and decorative detailing, while illuminated signs for Double Diamond, Ind Coope and Skol Lager were added later.

Differences between the former public, private and saloon bars remain visible. The public bar was arranged to allow drinking at the counter, while the saloon bar was fitted to a higher standard and retains a fireplace, a service hatch for meals from above, and much of its original 1930s tiled floor. The former private bar occupied the central section and originally had its own entrance from Romilly Street.

The upper floors appear to have been built as domestic accommodation rather than public rooms. They preserve evidence that the building was once divided into two properties, including a separate staircase serving the eastern side. The first floor has been adapted for dining and kitchen use, but a number of mid-19th-century features survive, including floorboards, cupboards, decorative cornices and fireplaces. Further original room layouts and fittings remain on the second and third floors, while the principal staircase retains its historic balusters and newel posts.

== Notable patrons ==
- Francis Bacon
- Tom Baker
- The Beatles
- Jeffrey Bernard
- Peter Cook
- Lucian Freud
- John Hurt
- Richard Ingrams
- Danny Kirwan
- Eddie Linden
- George Melly
- Peter O'Toole
- Willie Rushton
- Keith Waterhouse
