= Remembrance of Things Fast: True Stories Visual Lies =

1994 film by John Maybury

Remembrance of Things Fast: True Stories Visual Lies is a 1994 British experimental film written and directed by filmmaker and video artist John Maybury. Loosely inspired by Marcel Proust's Remembrance of Things Past, from which it derives its name, the nonlinear film tracks the evolution of film, television, and global broadcasting. The film stars Tilda Swinton and Rupert Everett in lead roles.

The film was Maybury's first major work and was first presented at the Cleveland International Film Festival.

== Background and Plot ==
Remembrance of Things Fast is highly nonlinear and its plot is strung together by compilations of clips in a mix of narrative episodes, documentary clips, and abstract visuals. Thematically, the film grapples with 24/7 media coverage and its impacts, as well as misinformation in the media and gender and sexual politics. The film also, in Maybury's portrayal of its "imaginary nightmare broadcast", uses a great deal of homoerotic and HIV/AIDS-related imagery. Maybury made the film alongside fellow artists and actors who were living with HIV/AIDS, and Maybury later said on the moment that the film was created: " At that time the most important artists currently working were ACT-UP, initially in the States but eventually worldwide. It was impossible not to join in through my work with this crusade." The film also uses imagery of drag and drag queens.

== Reception and Legacy ==
Remembrance received mostly positive reviews. Variety described the film as a "witty barage of sexual diversity and media mayhem", praising it for its balance between abstract imagery and concrete debates and issues. The Guardian, in 2020, ranked Remembrance Tilda Swinton's 55th best film out of her 66 feature releases. The film later won the 1994 Independent/Experimental Award from the Los Angeles Film Critics Association, as well as the Berlin International Film Festival's Best Documentary Film Award.
