= Strand Palace Hotel =

Hotel in London (opened 1909)

Coordinates: 51.511°N 0.121°W

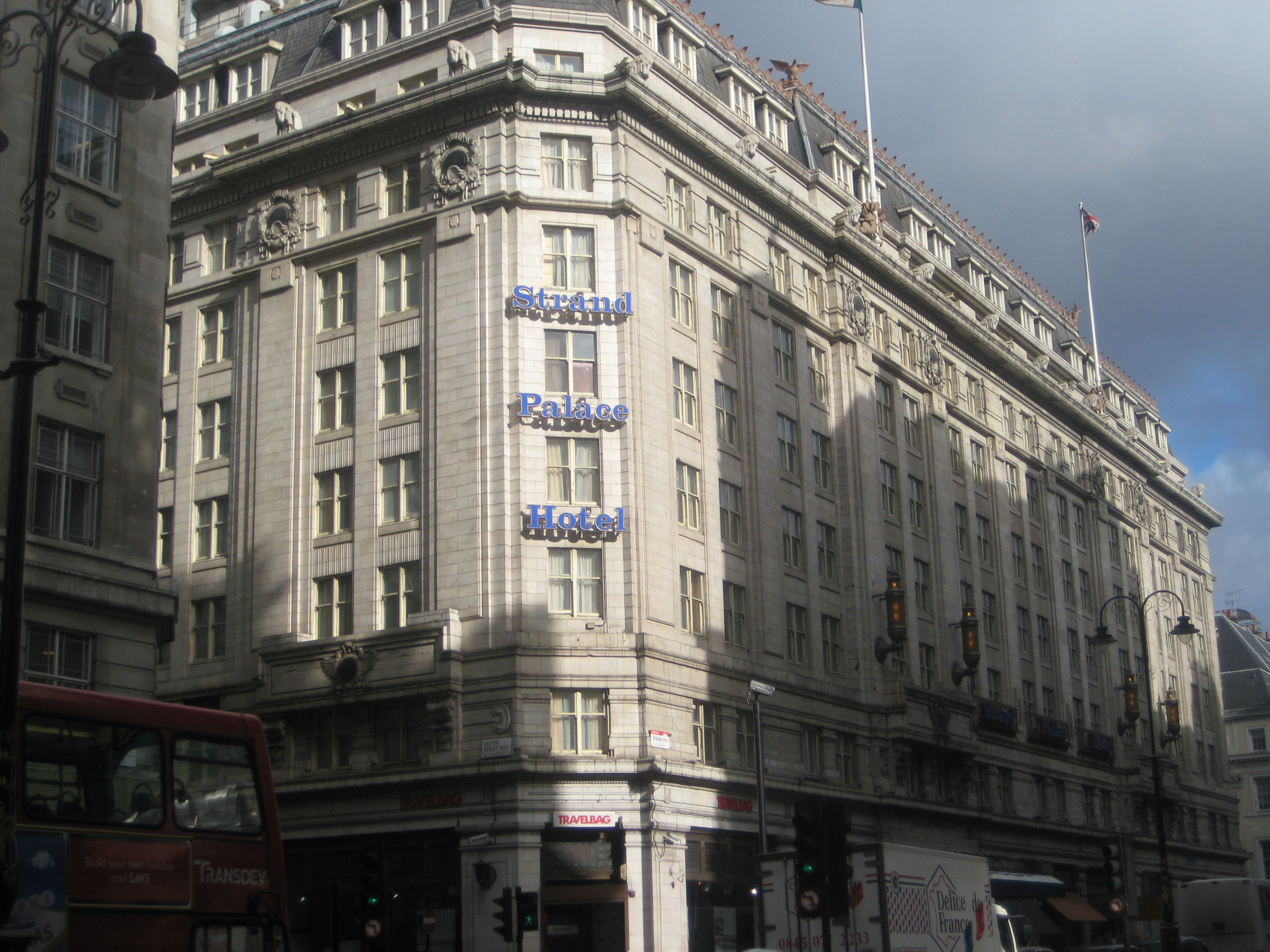
Strand Palace Hotel

The Strand Palace Hotel is a large hotel on the north side of the Strand, London, England, positioned close to Covent Garden, Aldwych, Trafalgar Square and the River Thames.

== History ==
The hotel was built after Exeter Hall was demolished in 1907. It opened in 1909 and was refurbished in the Art Deco style during the 1930s, but has now been modernised with the latest refurbishment in 2019.

Strand Hotel Limited was incorporated on 31 October 1907, with some 4,000 shareholders. Created by the Salmon and Gluckstein families, it was established to fund the building of the Strand Palace Hotel. J. Lyons & Co. acquired shares in this enterprise in 1922, and also bought the adjoining Haxells family hotel in order to expand and improve the Strand Hotel. At that time, a single room with breakfast would have set you back five shillings and six pence – just 27½p in today’s money.

After extensive redevelopment, the hotel became an art deco showcase, and re-opened in 1928, with 980 bedrooms. The rear of the property was occupied by the Winter Garden Restaurant, which had a large domed ceiling and could seat over 500 guests, who were served by over one hundred staff.

In February 1946, Neville Heath was found by staff members in a room standing over the body of Pauline Brees, an incident occurring during Heath's murder career.

After the war, the hotel made several improvements. Private bathrooms were installed in all guest rooms in 1958; this reduced the overall number of rooms at the hotel to 788. The new bathroom facilities meant that oil-fired boilers had to be installed.

In 1968, the front hall and ground floor restaurants, including the Winter Garden, were redesigned, and the first computerised billing system in London was installed. The revolving doors and other parts of the foyer designed by Oliver Bernard were removed in this redesign, but were of such fine quality and historic interest that the curators at the Victoria and Albert Museum requested them for their collection in 1969. The pieces were dismantled and stored in the museum's Battersea depot. The doors were exhibited in 2003 in the museum's major exhibition 'Art Deco: 1910–1939', following reconstruction.

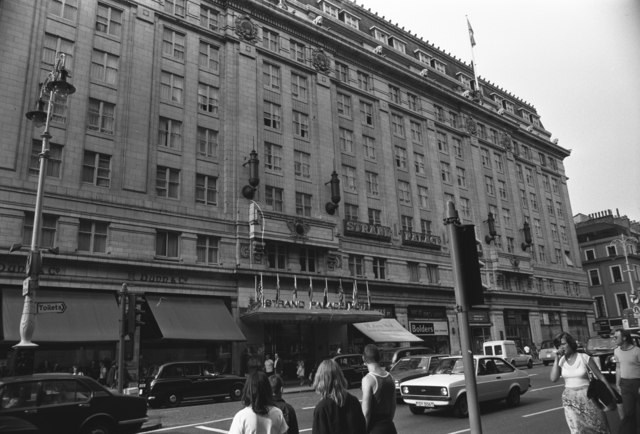
The Strand Palace hotel photographed on 25 August 1981

In 1976, Trust Houses Forte bought the lease of the Strand Palace Hotel from the Lyons Hotel Group. Over the next ten years, there was minor refurbishment throughout the hotel. In 1985, a more in-depth refurbishment was undertaken on all floors of the new hotel; this included new furniture, new bathrooms and a redecoration of the bedrooms.

London and Regional Properties took over the hotel in 2006. They contracted Michael Gallie to deliver an updated floor plan and area referencing, and outline the external elevations.
