= Oliver Bernard =

English poet and translator (1925–2013)

Oliver Bernard (6 December 1925 – 1 June 2013) was an English poet and translator. He is perhaps best known for translating Arthur Rimbaud into English as part of the Penguin Classics collection.

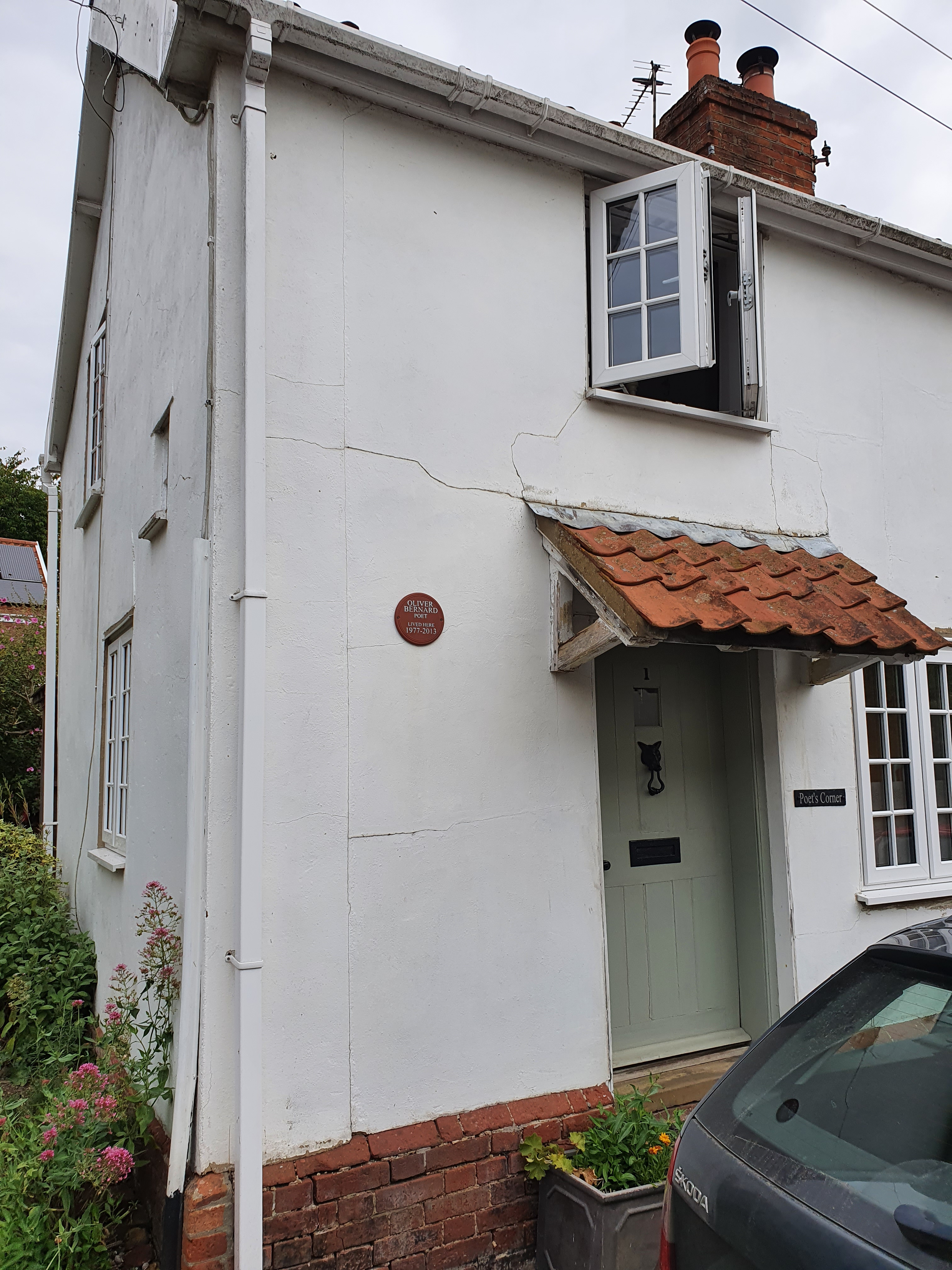
Bernard's former house, Poets' Corner, in Kenninghall, where a memorial plaque has been erected.

== Biography ==
Bernard was born in London, to the English architect Oliver Percy Bernard OBE and the opera singer Dora Hodges. He had two brothers, the art critic and photographer Bruce Bernard and the journalist Jeffrey Bernard. All three brothers were prominent in London's literary and artistic scene in the mid-twentieth century. He was a paternal cousin to the actor Stanley Holloway.

Bernard published a book of memoirs. Tony Benn wrote of him: "Oliver Bernard's Peace Poems are sensitive and perceptive in their description of the militaristic society which imprisons us all. They also offer some comforting visions of life as it could be if we release the compassion that is in us all."

In later life, Bernard converted to Roman Catholicism and lived in a small cottage in Kenninghall, Norfolk. In 1985 he spent several weeks in prison for his involvement in anti-nuclear civil disobedience action as part of the Snowball Campaign. He was married twice and had three children. Following his death, villagers in Kenninghall created two circular walks to remember him, one through Kenninghall Woods, and the other to the Quidenham Monastery.
