= Love Is the Devil: Study for a Portrait of Francis Bacon =

1998 film directed by John Maybury

- DVD cover
- Directed by: John Maybury
- Written by: John Maybury
- Produced by: Takashi Asai and the BBC
- Starring: Derek Jacobi; Daniel Craig; Anne Lambton; Karl Johnson; Annabel Brooks; Adrian Scarborough; Tilda Swinton
- Music by: Ryuichi Sakamoto
- Production companies: BBC Films; British Film Institute; Arts Council of England; Premiere Heure; Uplink; Partners in Crime
- Distributed by: Artificial Eye
- Release date: 1998
- Running time: 90 minutes
- Country: United Kingdom
- Language: English

Love Is the Devil: Study for a Portrait of Francis Bacon is a 1998 film produced by The British Film Institute and BBC Film. It was written and directed by John Maybury and stars Derek Jacobi, Daniel Craig and Tilda Swinton. A fictional biography of painter Francis Bacon (Jacobi), it concentrates on his strained relationship with George Dyer (Craig), a small-time thief. The film draws heavily on the authorised biography of Bacon, The Gilded Gutter Life of Francis Bacon by Daniel Farson, and is dedicated to him.

It won three awards at the Edinburgh International Film Festival: Best New British Feature (director John Maybury) and two Best British Performance awards, for Jacobi and Craig. The film was also screened in the Un Certain Regard section at the 1998 Cannes Film Festival. Craig's performance was well received by critics, acknowledging it as his breakthrough role.

== Plot ==
When George Dyer, who is still a stranger to Francis Bacon, is caught by Bacon breaking and entering into the artist's apartment studio, he seems to be in a bad position if Bacon decides to call for the police. Instead, Bacon looks him over and, entranced by his physique and good looks, boldly propositions him. Bacon states that if the would-be criminal would be willing to go to bed with him, then he can take anything he wants from the apartment in the morning. Dyer decides to take Bacon up on his proposition and the two sleep together. The evening starts an enduring relationship between the two men as Bacon starts to introduce Dyer to his circle of friends in the Soho art world.

Bacon introduces Dyer to the pub scene, in which he is comfortable being seen in and comfortable being himself. Dyer starts to take an interest in Bacon's art and the talk about its primitive and brutal aspects. While the two men start to live together, Bacon sees himself as a free agent in an open relationship and occasionally meets other companions. Dyer takes it badly when he learns of these flings and, at one point, even stashes some drugs in Bacon's apartment while calling the police to report it. Bacon is arrested, at first as a formality. Dyer apparently has taken out his anger and jealousy on Bacon.

Later, Bacon decides to take Dyer with him on a trip to New York City. Dyer stages a suicide attempt by threatening to jump off the roof of the hotel where they are staying. Bacon talks him down and, after giving him another 'gift' check for $20,000, decides that he will also offer to take Dyer to Paris. Dyer's drinking problems become more pronounced. He complains about Bacon to his artist friends and seems to have repeated incidents with the police. Meanwhile, Bacon tries to keep his creative projects moving forward. He struggles with issues of his self-identity and growing fame by indulging in drugs and alcohol. Dyer begins to become something of a nuisance, possibly beyond Bacon's ability to tolerate him much longer.

After some debate, the couple decide they will go to Paris together. Dyer's substance abuse reaches the level of his suffering from delirium tremens, and he attempts suicide by overdosing on drugs. Bacon's success in Paris does not particularly help them in their relationship. Dyer succumbs to the drugs, and Bacon is shown alone in his Paris apartment contemplating what it was like when Dyer was still alive and with him.

== Cast ==
- Derek Jacobi – Francis Bacon
- Daniel Craig – George Dyer
- Tilda Swinton – Muriel Belcher
- Anne Lambton – Isabel Rawsthorne
- Adrian Scarborough – Daniel Farson
- Karl Johnson – John Deakin
- Annabel Brooks – Henrietta Moraes
- Richard Newbould – Blond Billy (as Richard Newbold)
- Ariel de Ravenel – French Official
- Tallulah – Ian Board
- Andy Linden – Ken Bidwell
- David Kennedy – Joe Furneval
- Gary Hume – Volker Dix
- Damian Dibben – Brighton Rent Boy
- Antony Cotton – Brighton Rent Boy
- Hamish Bowles – David Hockney
- Martin Meister - Person in Brighton Pub

== Release ==
Love Is the Devil was released theatrically by Artificial Eye on 18 September 1998 in the UK and grossed £259,421 ($0.4 million). It was released in the United States by Strand Releasing on 7 October 1998 and grossed $343,023, for a worldwide total in excess of $0.8 million.

The film was first broadcast on BBC Two on 26 March 2000.
