= Carla Borel =

French-British photographer

Carla Borel (born 1973) is a French-British photographer. She has made portraits and black and white street photographs in Soho, London.

== Biography ==
Borel was born in Paris and raised in Southwick, Hampshire and Las Vegas. Her mother was a Las Vegas showgirl and appeared in Diamonds Are Forever. Her father worked at the Moulin Rouge in Paris, and encouraged her to keep a diary. Borel first worked in London as a croupier in casinos when she began recording the people around her with a Pentax SLR camera.

She was working as bartender at The French House in Soho when she started documenting Soho life with her camera and also organising artists' projects there. These included exhibitions with Paul Gorman, Neal Fox of Le Gun, and the first series of John Claridge's Soho Faces, the photography sessions for which Borel organised and were held in an upstairs room at The French House.

== Work ==
Borel shot her Stillsoho series using black and white film over a 15-year period. The portraits depicted artists, writers, flâneurs, friends and lovers and the people and landscape of a disappearing London, such as The Colony Room Club and its members. Citing John Deakin and Ida Kar as influences, Borel said of the series: "I was trying to document a new generation of Sohoites." Harper's Bazaar devoted a feature to the series, and they also appeared in The Guardian, The Daily Telegraph and in German photography magazine Schwarzweiss, which focussed on the strong sense of nostalgia captured in Stillsoho.

The Animals Were Beautiful (2016) were portraits of strangers travelling on the London Underground. Borel discreetly used an iPhone camera. In 2016 they were exhibited at the Royal Photographic Society's Magic Gallery, one of which was included in the Royal Academy Summer Exhibition group show. The title came from a video of Bruce Davidson discussing his Subway project in which he said the series happened in New York because he "didn’t need to go to the Serengeti plains, the animals were right here and they were beautiful".

Homme Libre (2017) was a set of candid portraits of men, in which Borel explored identity, community and ideas of masculinity as seen from a female perspective, and the degree of her own intimacy with the subjects. The title is taken from a Baudelaire poem, L'Homme et la Mer, in Les Fleurs du Mal. All the subjects wore a t-shirt bearing the first line from the poem: "Homme libre, toujours tu chériras la mer!". Notable subjects included Neil Bartlett and Adnan Sarwar. Borel published a photo zine of the prints, which were exhibited at A22 Gallery in London.

Borel had a regular slot in the photography journal, F22, interviewing and photographing artists. Her portraits have been published in Vogue (Germany) and L'Uomo Vogue.

In 2018, Borel was one of the photographers, with her portrait of Louise Haigh MP included in the Women Exhibition at Portcullis House – portraits of female MPs, all photographed by female photographers. The exhibition opened on 14 December, to mark the centenary of the date that some women over 30 and all men over 21 were able to cast their first vote, as part of a year-long series of events and exhibitions commemorating the women and men who fought to achieve electoral equality.

== Awards ==
- 2016: Finalist, Category B: Open Category, Kuala Lumpur International Photoawards, for "Concetta" from the "Stillsoho" series
- 2016: Finalist, Best Mobile Street Photo category, StreetFoto San Francisco, for a photograph from The Animals Were Beautiful
