= Suggs and the City =

2009 book by Suggs

Suggs and the City: My Journeys Through Disappearing London
- Author: Suggs
- Language: English
- Subject: London
- Published: London
- Publisher: Headline Publishing Group
- Publication date: 2009
- Publication place: United Kingdom
- Pages: 330
- ISBN: 9780755319268
- Dewey Decimal: 914.210486

Suggs and the City: My Journeys Through Disappearing London is a 2009 book by British singer-songwriter, musician, radio personality and actor, Suggs.

== Background and synopsis ==
Suggs, a solo artist, lead singer of Madness and radio personality is described as having a "lifelong love affair" with London. The book explores the living history of the capital from the last living rag-and-bone man, the haunts of Soho and the music scene of Camden Town.

== Reception ==
In the Camden New Journal Simon Wroe writes that "what distinguishes this from other literary offerings in the same vein is the author’s personal, often slightly illicit connection with much of his subject matter" and that the book is "plied with fascinating trivia" The book was also reviewed in The Guardian by Kate Webb.

== Adaptation into TV series ==
Suggs in the City is a television chat show made by Reef Television for ITV London. It was shot at The Colony Room in Soho, presented by Suggs and features interviews with celebrities and musical performances.
