= Liver: A Fictional Organ with a Surface Anatomy of Four Lobes =

- 1st edition
- Author: Will Self
- Language: English
- Genre: Short Story Collection
- Publisher: Viking Books
- Publication date: 4 September 2008
- Publication place: United Kingdom
- Media type: Print (hardback & paperback)
- Pages: 288 pp
- ISBN: 978-0-670-88997-6
- OCLC: 233552523
- Dewey Decimal: 823/.914 22
- LC Class: PR6069.E3654 L58 2008

Liver: A Fictional Organ with a Surface Anatomy of Four Lobes is the seventh collection of short stories by Will Self. The stories in the collection are all connected to the liver and was described by the author as "...a collection of two novellas and two longer short stories, all on a liverish theme. Each story features different people suffering from different forms of liver damage." Time Out was one of the first publications to review it and said...

"This inspired collection of four stories uses the liver as framework and controlling metaphor – there’s a tale for each lobe – but is less interested in the organ as a metabolic regulator than in what happens when it’s damaged beyond repair. At this point, Self’s gift for (ahem) bilious satire kicks in, its target largely the ‘slapstick of addiction’ – for which the reformed junky has witheringly little time...Self has all the fun you’d expect with this, and the result is satire so vicious it makes Charlie Brooker look restrained."

== Stories ==
Foie Humain
The story plots the lives and some key events of the regulars at The Plantation Club in Blore Court in London, a place that bears a resemblance to The Colony Room. These include the acquisition of a bar boy called Hilary, trips to the art exhibitions or plays of the regulars and funerals for some of the regulars. Everybody in the story is either a hard drinker or being groomed to be one. The decay and detritus that builds up within the club over the years parallels the buildup and eventual decay in (The Plantation Club landlord) Val Carmichael's Liver.

The Regulars are all profane in their language and are referred to by monikers (such as The Poof, the Dog, The Typist, His Nibs) rather than by their given names.

Over the course of time Val becomes weaker and weaker as he continues to drink heavily on a daily basis, till eventually the inevitable happens with the result of Hilary taking his place at the bar as the new proprietor and employing a new bar boy (Stevie) and one of the regulars revealing that they are exactly as their name suggests.

Leberknödel
Joyce Beddoes is a terminally ill elderly woman with liver cancer who travels to Switzerland from her home in England to meet with Dr Hohl, to prepare for euthanasia. Travelling with her is her daughter Isobel. In the last few hours before her appointment Joyce mulls over her life.

Upon entering Dr Hohl's flat she relaxes and begins eating truffles and an anti-emetic before he finally presents her with a glass of poison. At this moment, holding the glass, Joyce finds herself thinking about a wasp. She leaves without drinking the poison and abandons her clingy and slovenly daughter to a Swiss women's prison. Taking advantage of a Catholic hospice's pastoral care arrangements, she lives on until deciding to eventually use the services of Dr Hohl's assisted suicide clinic at a delayed time of her own choosing, while taking the opportunity to tour Zurich.

The title of this story, Leberknödel, is a German dish of Liver Dumplings. The story is also presented in smaller sections; Introitus, Kyrie, Sequentia, offertorium, Sanctus, Benedictus, Agnus Dei and Communio.

Prometheus
A transposition of the ancient Greek myth of theft of divine prerogatives, human hubris and retribution, in which Zeus is a corporate CEO, Athena is his glamorous daughter, Pandora is an upmarket sex worker and Prometheus and Epimetheus are advertising agency executives.

Like his namesake Prometheus' liver is eaten daily; in this variation by a griffon vulture three times a day. The bird itself is adept at seeking him out when it is time to feed. At one point negotiating a busy kitchen to find Prometheus waiting in the bathroom. These feedings leave Prometheus in a weakened condition as the day progresses and he has less and less of a functioning liver.

Birdy Num Num
A hepatitis virus describes the lives and clients of a Soho flat's drug dealer resident from a parasite's point of view. One of the users caught up in the action of the story believes himself to be Peter Sellers in his role as Hrundi V. Bakshi in the film The Party with the other characters of the story filling in for the characters in the film. The story is opened by the virus promising the reader a tale of its latest victim, not a whodunit, but whether-they-deserved-it.

All of the stories in the collection contain connections to one another with characters and places from each, such as The Plantation Club, cropping up in other stories. This is a common trait of Self's work and can be seen in his previous use of the character Zack Busner.

== Style ==
As with much of Self's fiction there is a heavy emphasis on certain elements of the prose.

In each of the stories the city it is set in is described in detail. For example, the area of London in which The Plantation Club is set is described from the point of view of an idle wanderer. The intertwining alleys are described along with the masonry, architecture, and history of the buildings. This helps to establish not only the surroundings for the story but to also give a strong sense of scale: the regulars at the club, enclosed by the club, by the alley, by the suburb, by the city, etc. This idea of scale is also a recurring theme in Self's work, perhaps best encapsulated by the short story Scale in the earlier collection Grey Area.

Self also continues his love of words. His previous works have at times been overloaded with obscure and obsolete words and although less prevalent in this collection there are still some examples that may require some looking up. Self is also not afraid to use elements of foreign language in his prose, and this is most apparent in "Leberknödel." In that story not only are there lines in Latin from an Aria, and elements of the Swiss German spoken by the characters, but also the phonic sound of them (mis)speaking English. For example...

"The people who live there are not the best off type, but the city council - the canton, also - are thinking about taking the action. I think they will be made to move soon. (Moov zoon.)"

...illustrates both how Self conveys the characters' enunciation as well as their grammatical approach to English.
