= Oliver Percy Bernard =

English architect

Bernard in The Boston Globe

Oliver Percy Bernard OBE MC (8 April 1881 – 15 April 1939) was an English architect, and scenic, graphic and industrial designer. He was instrumental in developing conservative Victorian British taste in a modernist European direction; much of his work is frequently characterised as art deco.

== Early life ==
Born in Camberwell, London, Bernard was the son of Charles Bernard, (d.1894), a theatre manager, and his wife, Annie Allen, an actress. Oliver Bernard experienced an unhappy childhood in London and, on the death of his father in 1894, left for Manchester to take a job as a stage hand in a theatre. There, he took on his own education by reading John Locke, John Ruskin and others. He ultimately took a series of menial jobs at sea, before returning to London to take up scene painting with Walter Hann.

In 1905, Bernard went to New York to work as principal scenic artist for Klaw & Erlanger, and then as assistant artist at the new Boston Opera House in 1909. He returned to London where he was resident scenic artist for the Grand Opera Syndicate Ltd., managers and lessees of the Royal Opera House, Covent Garden.

At the beginning of World War I in 1914, Bernard was rejected for active military service owing to deafness. He became frustrated at his inability to serve in the war, and by the conservatism of the London theatre. He travelled to the Americas where he stayed for a short period before returning to England on the RMS Lusitania in 1915; he survived its sinking. After his rescue he completed a series of sketches which were published in The Illustrated London News. In 1916, he was commissioned into the Royal Engineers as a camouflage officer, serving in France, Italy and Belgium, reaching the rank of captain. For his services, he was awarded the Military Cross and OBE, respectively.

== Post-war ==
In 1919, Bernard continued his theatrical work, designing sets for Sir Thomas Beecham's Ring Cycle at Covent Garden. By the 1920s, he began to display an interest in trade and industry, new materials and techniques and adopted a populist approach to decoration. He became a consultant to the Board of Overseas Trade, overhauling the lighting and stage management at the Admiralty Theatre of H. M. Government Pavilion at the British Empire Exhibition in 1924, where he also designed displays. The following year, he became a consultant to the British government for the Exposition Internationale des Arts Décoratifs et Industriels Modernes in Paris.

== J. Lyons and Co. ==
Bernard was consultant artistic director to J. Lyons and Co., defining much of their later house style and designing interiors for their Oxford Street, Coventry Street, and Strand Corner Houses. In 1934 he remodelled the interiors of the Regent Palace Hotel, including the basement bars, restaurants, and the ground-floor coffee room, since named the Titanic Room and worked on the Cumberland Hotel in 1932.

== Later work ==
He designed parts of the Strand Palace Hotel's Foyer, and its revolving doors; the doors are now owned by The Victoria and Albert Museum.

Bernard wrote on design and architecture and championed the exploitation of engineering expertise. He worked on furniture design and, from the late 1930s, designed a number of industrial buildings, most notably the Supermarine works in Southampton and the IMCO building on Dublin's south coast built for a dry-cleaning firm, now since demolished. He was involved in founding PEL (Practical Equipment Ltd) and designed the S.P.4 chair for them.

== In print ==
Bernard's work and writing feature in a small number of anthology publications on architecture and design including Benton, Charlotte et al. Art Deco 1910–1939, (V&A Publications, 2003) and Le Corbusier and Britain: An Anthology, edited by Irena Murray and Julian Osley (Routledge, 2009). His IMCO building was the subject of a 2012 film by the Irish artist Gavin Murphy, and formed part of a subsequent publication On Seeing Only Totally New Things, that also includes the first comprehensive and illustrated account of Bernard's life and work.

== Personality and family ==
His former secretary described him as "amusing, utterly impossible, kind, and a bully". He was a cousin to the actor Stanley Holloway (Bernard's father Charles was a brother to Holloway's maternal grandmother), to Holloway's son, the actor Julian Holloway and Julian's daughter, the author and former model Sophie Dahl.

Bernard was married twice; first to the singer Muriel Theresa Lightfoot in 1911 (the marriage dissolved in 1924) and then to Edith Dora Hodges (1896–1950), an opera singer whose stage name was Fedora Roselli, in 1924. From this relationship, the couple had two daughters and three sons including the poet and translator Oliver Bernard who attended the Westminster School and later published a book of memoirs. Bernard's two other sons were Bruce Bernard, a photographer and art critic and Jeffrey Bernard who became a noted journalist.

Bernard died unexpectedly of peritonitis in London in 1939. His estate was valued at £2,950 at the time of his death but he left his wife with heavy debts. Despite this she managed to send their three sons to independent schools.

== Bibliography ==
- Bernard, O. (1936). Cock Sparrow: A True Chronicle. London.
- Bernard, O. [junior] (1992). Getting Over It: Recollections. London: Peter Owen. ISBN 0-7206-0865-1.
- Gyger, Alison (1990). Opera for the Antipodes (Opera in Australia 1881–1939). Sydney: Currency Press and Pellinor Pty Ltd. ISBN 0-86819-268-6.
- Holloway, Stanley; Richards, Dick (1967). Wiv a little bit o' luck: The life story of Stanley Holloway. London: Frewin. OCLC 3647363.
- Links, J. G. (1985). "Oliver Bernard, the Barbican and me". 30s Society Journal. 5: 2–7.
- Murphy, Gavin (2013). On Seeing Only Totally New Things. Dublin: Royal Hibernian Academy. pp. 99–126. ISBN 978-1-903875-68-1.
- Parker, E. (1984). "Working for Oliver Bernard and the early days of PEL Ltd". Journal of the Decorative Arts Society. 8: 50–57.
- Powers, A. (2004) "Bernard, Oliver Percy (1881–1939)", rev., Oxford Dictionary of National Biography, Oxford University Press, accessed 22 August 2007 (subscription, Wikipedia Library access or UK public library membership required)
- — (2007) "Bernard, Oliver (Percy)", Grove Art Online, Oxford University Press, accessed 22 August 2007 (subscription or UK public library membership required)
- Sauder, E. & Marschall, K. (1993). R. M. S. Lusitania: Triumph of the Edwardian Age. Shipping Books Press. pp. pp46–47. ISBN 0-946184-80-1.
- Wang, R. J. (2003–2005). "Mr. Oliver Percy Bernard, Saloon Class Passenger". The Lusitania Resource.
