= Jeremy Clarke (writer) =

British writer

Jeremy John Clarke (9 February 1957 – 21 May 2023) was a British writer best known for his 24-year stint as The Spectator's Low Life columnist.

== Early life and education ==
Born in Rochford, Essex, he was the eldest of three children of John Lewis Clarke, a bank clerk who later became a car park attendant, and Audrey Clarke (née Brice), a nurse. Clarke attended Buckhurst Hill County High School in Chigwell, where he completed two O-levels. Following a backpacking trip to the Democratic Republic of Congo, Clarke pursued further education by obtaining A-levels through night school. After being rejected by Hertford College, Oxford, he enrolled at the School of Oriental and African Studies (SOAS), University of London, to study African studies.

== Career ==
Clarke began his writing career by reviewing a book on ferret husbandry for a student magazine, which caught the attention of University College London professor Karl Miller. This connection helped him secure an agent, Alexandra Pringle, and a book deal with a £50,000 advance, although the book was not completed. He also wrote columns for Prospect and The Independent on Sunday.

In 1999, Clarke joined The Spectator magazine, where he wrote the "Low Life" column previously associated with Jeffrey Bernard, under the editorship of Boris Johnson and his deputy Stuart Reid. His writing often detailed his experiences in Devon and London.

In 2013, Clarke was diagnosed with prostate cancer, a subject he addressed in his columns. He continued his journalism work during and after his treatment.
