= Love All (novel) =

- First edition
- Author: Molly Parkin
- Language: English
- Publication date: 1974

Love All is the first novel by the journalist, writer and artist Molly Parkin, originally published in 1974.

== Publication history ==
The book was originally submitted as a 750-word outline to publishers Blond & Briggs. Although editorial staff disliked it, a secretary commented that she liked it, and it was picked up for publication. It was published in the UK in 1974 by Blond & Briggs, with reprints in 1997, 1979 (twice) and 1980 by Star.

== Critical reception ==
Love All was reviewed by the Daily Telegraph which said that it was "written with the lightest of touches and a mirthful exhilarated sense of its own libidousness...quite the funniest novel I have read in a long while". Another review, in the Irish Times, in a reference to the sexual content of the book, called it "disgusting".
