= Michael Heath (cartoonist) =

British cartoonist and illustrator

Michael John Heath is a British strip cartoonist and illustrator. He has been cartoon editor of The Spectator since 1991.

== Biography ==
Heath was born on 13 October 1935, in Bloomsbury, London. His father, George Heath, was also a cartoonist of boy's adventure comics, a job he detested. Heath's relationship with both his parents was distant and neither birthdays nor Christmas were celebrated. During the war Heath was evacuated to his grandmother's house in Torcross, in Devon. In 1947 the family moved to Brighton. While studying at art college, which he loathed, Heath sold his first cartoons to Melody Maker for two guineas. He later got work illustrating album covers for Decca Records and drew a strip called "Nelly Know-all" for the Women's Sunday Mirror. By the 1960s he was part of the Soho social crowd that included Jeffrey Bernard, Lucian Freud and Francis Bacon.

His work has appeared in numerous British publications including Punch, Lilliput, the Evening Standard, The Evening News, The Guardian, The Spectator, The Independent, The Sunday Times, The Mail on Sunday, and Private Eye; all his work is signed simply as "HEATH".

He has been cartoon editor of The Spectator since 1991, and the cartoons which are published have not always adhered to the magazine's conservative politics. Heath's own political cartoons have also appeared in The Independent.

In August 2016 he was the guest for the long-running BBC Radio 4 programme Desert Island Discs. His favourite choice was "Criss Cross" by Thelonious Monk. His other choices were "Dance of the Infidels" by Bud Powell, "Teddy Bears' Picnic" by Henry Hall & His Orchestra, "Max In An Air Raid (I Never Slept A Wink All Night)" by Max Miller, "Take a Step" by Jack Buchanan, "All the Things You Are" by The Quintet, "Funny Face" by Fred and Adele Astaire, with Julian Jones & His Orchestra and "Lover" by Charlie Parker. His book choice was The Diary of a Nobody by George and Weedon Grossmith and his luxury item was an artist's painting set.

Heath has been married three times, the first time for 32 years, the second time for 18 years. He has four daughters in total, two from each of his first two marriages. He kept a black and tan Dachshund, Charlie, for many years until Charlie's death in August 2019. Michael now lives with his third wife, Hilary (née Penn), in Bloomsbury.

== Cartoon series ==
=== Great Bores of Today ===
Great Bores of Today was a long-running series in Private Eye. Each has a single frame, in which some immediately recognizable species of modern cultural bore is seen in his or her natural environs, haranguing bystanders, reporters, the viewer, or imagined listeners. Underneath is a lengthy chunk of the logorrhea that the bore utters distinguished in particular by the bland inconsistency of the bore's opinions. (The text is contributed by other Private Eye regulars.) The series has been resurrected in Richard Ingram's monthly magazine, The Oldie, with illustrations again by Heath.

=== The Suits ===
A series that appeared in The Spectator, lampooning the interchangeability and solemnity of men in their suits (or the utter helplessness of the normally besuited when temporarily deprived of their suits).

=== The Regulars ===
"The Regulars" ran in Private Eye; the "regulars" are Jeffrey Bernard and the other regular customers of the Coach & Horses pub in Soho. The cartoons were used in the play Jeffrey Bernard is Unwell.

=== The Gays ===
Another series in Private Eye, from the early 1980s.

=== Style Victims ===
Published in the London Sunday Times, this series makes fun of the conscious, and unconscious, style or fashion victims. (One frame shows a pair of sour-faced judges in ceremonial clothes and wigs, one grimly asking the other "What is a style victim?")

=== Numero Uno ===
A series that ran in Private Eye, "Numero Uno" makes fun of baseball-capped youth, with Walkman earphones permanently implanted in ears.

=== The Outlaw ===
A short lived strip set in the year 2000, where Michael Common is "the last person to smoke in England". Published in The Spectator.

=== Partners ===
Partnership and baby-rearing in the England of the 90s. Published in The Independent.

=== Henry King ===
A disturbingly precocious baby, permanently wearing a baseball cap. Published in The Spectator.

== Bibliography ==
=== Collections of Heath's cartoons ===
- Private Eye Michael Heath. 1973.
- Book of Bores. London: Private Eye & André Deutsch, 1976.
- Michael Heath's Automata. London: A. P. Rushton, 1976.
- The Punch cartoons of Heath. Harrap, 1976.
- Love All? Michael Heath's Cartoons from the Guardian. London: Blond & Briggs, 1982.
- Private Eye's Bores 3. : ISBN 978-0-233-97608-2
- The Best of Heath. Newton Abbott: David & Charles, 1984.
- Welcome to America. London: Heinemann, 1985.
- Baby. London: Heinemann, 1988.
- The Complete Heath. London: John Murray, 1991. (Note: Not the complete Heath by any means, but a collection of cartoons from the series "The Suits", "The Regulars", "Style Victims", "Numero Uno", and "Great Bores of Today", as well as political and other topical cartoons.)
- Heath's 90s. London: Hodder & Stoughton, 1997. (Note: Reproduces "The Outlaw", "Partners", "Henry King", new installments of "Great Bores of Today", as well as many political cartoons.)

=== Partial list of works illustrated by Heath ===
- Back with Parren, E. W. Hildick, London: Macmillan, 1968.
- The Computer People, Anne Denny Angus, London: Faber & Faber, 1970.
- Robert Morley's Book of Bricks, Robert Morley, London: Weidenfeld & Nicolson, 1978. (Illustrated by Heath and Geoffrey Dickinson.)
- The Job of Acting: A guide to working in the theatre, Clive Swift, London: Harrap, 1979.
- Robert Morley's Book of Worries, Robert Morley, London: Weidenfeld & Nicolson, 1979. (Illustrations by Heath and Geoffrey Dickinson.)
- Loose Talk: Adventures on the streets of shame, Tina Brown, London: Michael Joseph, 1979.
- The Anti-Booklist, Brian Redhead and Kenneth McLeish (eds), London: Hodder & Stoughton, 1981.
- Fanny Peculiar, Keith Waterhouse, London: Michael Joseph, 1983.
- Second Best Bed, Fenton Bresler, London: Weidenfeld & Nicolson. 1983.
- Merde! The real French you were never taught at school, Genevieve, London: Angus & Robertson, 1984.
- No Laughing Matter: A collection of political jokes, Steven Lukes and Itzhak Galnoor, London: Routledge, 1985.
- How's Your Glass? A quizzical look at drinks and drinking, Kingsley Amis, London: Weidenfeld & Nicolson, 1985.
- Waterhouse at Large, Keith Waterhouse, London: Michael Joseph, 1985.
- Merde encore! More of the real French you were never taught at school, Genevieve, London: Angus, 1986.
- Talking Horses, Jeffrey Bernard, London: Fourth Estate, 1987.
- Beyond Fear, Dorothy Rowe, London: Fontana, 1987.
- Winewise; or, How to be streetwise about wine, Alice King, London: Methuen, 1987.
- All Gourmets Great and Small, Clive and Angela Russell-Taylor, Southampton: Ashford Press, 1988.
- High Life, Taki, London: Viking, 1989.
- Generation Games, Laurie Graham, London: Chatto & Windus, 1990.
- A Parent's Survival Guide, Laurie Graham, London: Chatto & Windus, 1991.
- Countryblast, Clive Aslet, London: John Murray, 1991.
- British Teeth: An excruciating journey from the dentist's chair to the rotten heart of a nation, William R. Leith, London: Faber & Faber, 2002.
- The English at Table, Digby Anderson, London: Social Affairs Unit, 2006
