= Muriel Belcher =

English nightclub owner (1908–1979)

Muriel Belcher photographed by John Deakin at the Colony Room c. the mid 1950s

Muriel Belcher (26 Jun 1908–31 October 1979) was an English nightclub owner and artist's model who founded and managed the private drinking club The Colony Room. She was described by the journalist Jeffrey Bernard as "Originally from Birmingham, a Jewish lesbian". The club opened in 1948 at 41 Dean Street, Soho, London and became known as "Muriel's". Its long term popularity amongst London's bohemians lasted for 60 years and is widely credited to the exclusivity resulting from Belcher's charisma, strong personality and daunting door policy as "a tough, sharp-tongued veteran of the Soho drinking club scene".

Belcher was the model and muse for a number of paintings, including several single panels and triptychs by Francis Bacon, who was one of the club's first members and used his fame to draw early clientele. His portrait of her, Seated Woman (Portrait of Muriel Belcher), sold at Sotheby's in Paris in December 2007 for €13.7 million.

Over time, the club was frequented by well-known people including Lucian Freud, George Melly, Jeffrey Bernard and the Kray Twins. The club continued after Belcher's death in 1979, and saw a resurgence in the early 1990s during the Young British Artists boom in the early 1990s, before ultimately closing in 2008.

== Career ==
=== The Colony Room ===
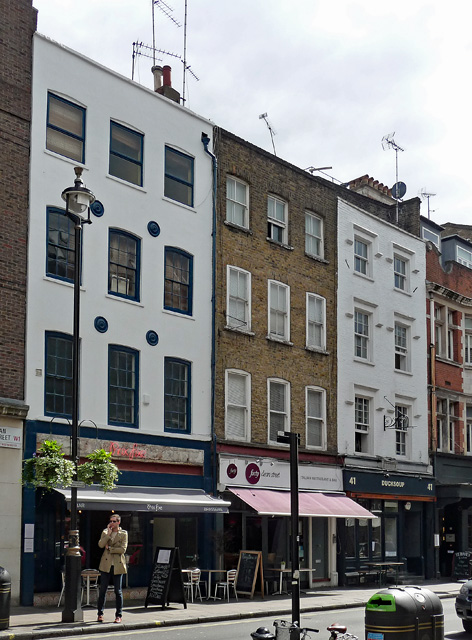
The Colony Room location on Dean Street

Belcher had earlier run a club called the Music-box in Leicester Square during World War II. She managed to secure a 3pm-to-11pm drinking licence for the Colony Room bar as a private members' club, whereas public houses had to close at 2:30pm. Francis Bacon was a founding member, walking in the day after it opened in 1948. He was "adopted" by Belcher as a "daughter" and allowed free drinks and £10 a week to bring in friends and rich patrons.

The club gained notoriety for its décor and clientele; its bilious green walls were as famous as the club itself. In addition to its vile colour, the staircase that led to the establishment was described as foul-smelling and flanked by dustbins. The Room was operated by Belcher between opening and her death in 1979. The Museum of London website says of the Colony Room, "The Colony Room was one of many drinking clubs in Soho. The autocratic and temperamental owner Muriel Belcher created an ambiance which suited those who thought of themselves as misfits or outsiders." Belcher was filmed inside the club in the 323rd Look at Life short, "Members Only".

According to Christopher Hitchens, "Muriel, arguably the rudest person in England ('shut up cunty and order some more champagne'), almost never left her perch at the corner of the bar and was committed to that form of humour that insists on referring to all gentlemen as ladies."

=== Model ===
The left hand panel from Bacon’s 1966 triptych Three Studies for a Portrait of Muriel Belcher

Belcher's sexuality attracted a large number of gay men to the club, many of them brought to the club by her Jamaican girlfriend, Carmel Stuart. She had a knack for attracting or discovering interesting and colourful people, and the patronage of men like George Melly and Bacon helped to establish the Colony Room's close-knit community. Lady Rose McLaren, one of Bacon's friends, was a habituée of the club in her London days. Belcher was also famous for her rudeness, a trait which rubbed off onto the club and became part of its culture.

Her favourite word was "cunt", and this she delivered in distinctive and ringing tones. According to Belcher, "cunt" was a term of abuse, "cunty" a term of affection. Her ultimate accolade and sign of acceptance was the endearment "Mary".

== Death and reputation ==
After Belcher's death, the club continued under the stewardship of her long-term barman Ian Board, known as Ida, until his death in 1994. In turn, it then passed to his veteran barman Michael Wojas, and from him to Dick Bradsell. Until it closed, the Colony Room remained popular with artists of all types, in particular those who had come to be known as Young British Artists (YBAs), including Damien Hirst, Sarah Lucas and Tracey Emin.

Belcher was portrayed by Tilda Swinton in John Maybury's 1999 film Love Is the Devil: Study for a Portrait of Francis Bacon.

== Sources ==
- Farson, Daniel. The Gilded Gutter Life of Francis Bacon. London: Vintage, 1994. ISBN 978-0-0993-0781-5
- Muir, Robin. "A Maverick Eye". London: Thames & Hudson, 2002. ISBN 0-500-54244-9
- Peppiatt, Michael. Francis Bacon in the 1950s. London: Yale University Press, 2006. ISBN 0-300-12192-X
- Peppiatt, Michael. Francis Bacon: Anatomy of an Enigma. London: Weidenfeld & Nicolson, 1996. ISBN 0-297-81616-0
