= Molly Parkin =

Welsh painter, novelist and journalist (1932–2026)

Molly Noyle Parkin
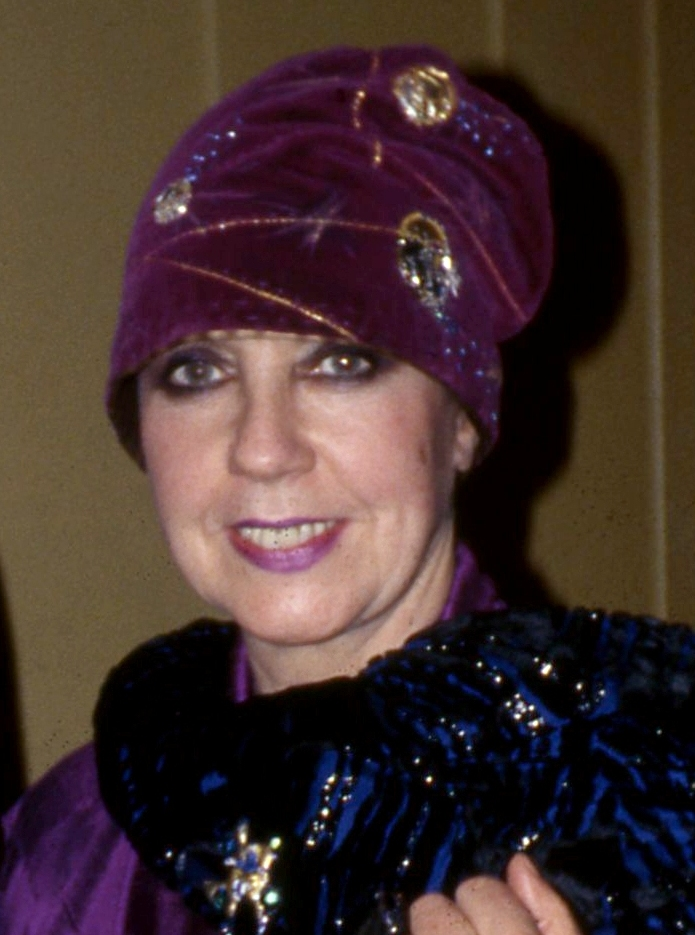
- Parkin in 1991
- Born: Molly Noyle Thomas; 3 February 1932; Pontycymer, Glamorgan, Wales
- Died: 5 January 2026 (aged 93)
- Education: Goldsmiths College; Brighton College of Art
- Known for: Painter, novelist, and journalist
- Children: Sophie Parkin and Sarah Lieberson

Molly Noyle Parkin (née Thomas; 3 February 1932 – 5 January 2026) was a Welsh painter, novelist and journalist, who became most well-known for her work on Nova magazine, newspapers and television in the 1960s.

== Early life ==
Parkin was born on 3 February 1932, the second of two daughters, in Pontycymer in the Garw Valley, Glamorgan, Wales. She and her family moved to London to live with her grandparents when the Second World War began in 1939. She went to Willesden County Grammar School (now Capital City Academy). During the war, without her parents' knowledge, at the age of 12 she worked on a paper round in Dollis Hill, London, in the evenings. She told her mother that she was studying art after-hours at school. Her grandfather saw her delivering papers, however, and reported this to her mother, who prevented her from continuing with the job and punished her by making her do housework. After this, Parkin earned a little money from a Mr Hill, their lodger, who took pity on her and paid her to clean his room. She idolised Hill, who she thought was a gentleman, and many years later saw similar characteristics in the actor James Robertson Justice. Later the family bought a tobacconist's and newsagent shop, which employed four paperboys. When one of the paperboys was caught stealing money, her mother—needing to fill his shift quickly—made Parkin, then aged 14, do his paper round instead. On her first day, a car knocked her off her bicycle and she hit her head on the kerb. She was knocked unconscious, hospitalised, and spent about a year off school, convalescing. Parkin spent much of this period alone in her room above the shop, drawing and painting. This developed into an interest in the arts.

== Career ==
In 1949 Parkin gained a scholarship to study fine art at Goldsmiths College, London, and then a scholarship to Brighton College of Art. After marriage, she became a teacher, painting throughout this period. Following a series of affairs, including a long-term association with James Robertson Justice, Parkin separated from her husband at the start of the 1960s; at this time she lost the desire, inspiration and passion to continue with her artwork.

To support her two daughters, Parkin turned to fashion. After making hats and bags for Barbara Hulanicki at Biba, and working alongside Mary Quant, she opened her own Chelsea boutique, which was featured in a Newsweek article about Swinging London. She sold the shop to business partner Terence Donovan, then joined Nova magazine in 1965, when the radical Dennis Hackett became its editor. David Gibbs' comprehensive anthology of Nova pages and images says of Parkin: "A dynamic sense of colour and design was all she needed to guide her. Unfettered by the accepted wisdom of the fashion system, she introduced an unconventional and startling view of what women could wear... always teasing the edges of taste... She set the standard."

In that year 1965, Parkin starred in the anti-war film Good Times, Wonderful Times, by Lionel Rogosin which represented Britain at the Venice Film Festival that year.

In her two years as fashion editor, the flamboyant Parkin raised the bar with her coverage – shot by the new generation of young photographers – that again affirmed the Swinging City, which Time magazine reported in 1966 as the hub of creativity and hedonism. Parkin moved on to become fashion editor of Harpers & Queen in 1967, and The Sunday Times in 1969, being named Fashion Editor of the Year in 1971. After becoming a television personality in the 1970s, Parkin was banned from the BBC for swearing.

In the 1970s, as a chatshow celebrity and libidinous novelist, Parkin wrote an uninhibited weekly interview in the Saturday edition of the Evening Standard. She also wrote a 750-word outline for a novel entitled Love All. Although it was disliked by publishers Blond & Briggs, the office secretary commented that she liked it, and it was picked up for publication in 1974. Her second novel was more sexually oriented. Published in 1975, Up Tight was highly publicised, thanks to fashion photographer Harry Peccinotti's cover shot of a French model wearing see-through knickers; this jacket design resulted in booksellers Hatchards keeping it under the counter. After returning from living in New York City in 1980, Parkin split from her second husband, Patrick Hughes, and was again in need of funds to pay for her daughters' education. By the time her novel Breast Stroke was published in 1983, she had become an alcoholic. The three publications, plus various articles for men's magazines, earned her the position of 24th in Time Out magazine's review of London's best erotic writers.

After the publication of her autobiography Moll: The Making of Molly Parkin in 1993, Parkin started painting again, with her first exhibition in more than a decade at the Washington Gallery in Penarth. Much of her new work was inspired by Celtic landscapes, in particular Pontycymer—although she also found her travels in India moved her to produce more vibrantly coloured works. In October 2010, her memoirs Welcome to Mollywood were published.

In 2010, a portrait of Parkin painted by Darren Coffield was exhibited at the National Portrait Gallery, London for the BP Portrait Award.

She was a "castaway" on the BBC Radio 4 programme Desert Island Discs in May 2011.

In May 2012, she was awarded a Civil List Pension by the Queen for her services to the arts.

Parkin featured in an episode of Channel 4's Britain's Weirdest Council Houses in February 2016, in which she was filmed in her council flat in a tower block in the World's End Estate at the World's End area of Chelsea. She had moved into the flat in 2002, after she was declared bankrupt following a period of alcoholism.

In 2017, Parkin appeared live in a one-woman show at a London salon hosted by Simon Oldfield of Pin Drop Studio.

== Death ==
Parkin died on 5 January 2026, at the age of 93.
