= Patrick Hughes (artist) =

British artist working in London (born 1939)

- Born: 20 October 1939 (age 86); Birmingham, England
- Education: James Graham Day College
- Known for: Artist
- Notable work: Paradoxymoron: Foolish Wisdom in Words and Pictures
- Style: "Reverspective"
- Website: Official web site

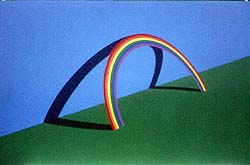
Patrick Hughes. Leaning on a Landscape, 1979, print

Patrick Hughes (born 20 October 1939) is a British artist working in London. He is the creator of "reverspective", an optical illusion on a three-dimensional surface where the parts of the picture which seem farthest away are actually physically the nearest.

== Life ==
Patrick Hughes was born in Birmingham, attended Hull Grammar School and went on to study at the James Graham Day College in Leeds in 1959. Later he taught at the Leeds College of Art from 1964-1970 before becoming an independent artist. Hughes lives above his studio near Old Street, London, with his wife, the historian and biographer Diane Atkinson. He has three sons by his first wife, Rennie Paterson, and was later married to the author Molly Parkin.

== Art ==
Hughes' exhibition with Bel-air Fine Art, 'Illusory Spaces,' ran from February 2024 in San Marco, Venice. In the summer of 2023 he showed at Alon Zakaim Fine Art. In July 2011, Hughes celebrated 'Fifty Years in Showbusiness' with two exhibitions in London. Since 2018 Hughes has represented himself through his Reverspective gallery.

In the 1970s Hughes hung his investigations of perception and illusion on the motif of the rainbow in a series of prints and paintings, such as Pile of Rainbows (1973), Prison Rainbow (1973) and Leaning on a Landscape (1979). Later prints like Leaf Art (1975) and paintings like Realistic Paint (1977) expressed similar interests with colour.

His first "reverse perspective" or "reverspective" was Sticking Out Room (1964), which was a life-size room for the Institute of Contemporary Arts (ICA) in 1970. He returned to explore the possibilities of reverspective in 1990 with Up the Line and Down the Road (1991)

He explains reverspective:

Reverspectives are three-dimensional paintings that when viewed from the front initially give the impression of viewing a painted flat surface that shows a perspective view. However as soon as the viewer moves their head even slightly the three dimensional surface that supports the perspective view accentuates the depth of the image and accelerates the shifting perspective far more than the brain normally allows. This provides a powerful and often disorienting impression of depth and movement. The illusion is made possible by painting the view in reverse to the relief of the surface, that is, the bits that stick farthest out from the painting are painted with the most distant part of the scene.

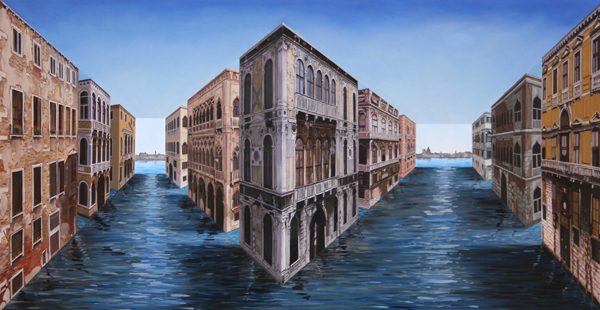
Patrick Hughes. Vanishing Venice

Physical structure of Vanishing Venice

The picture surface of Vanishing Venice (above) is three-dimensional, made of two pyramids with their tops cut off protruding towards the viewer: the bases of the pyramids are farthest away (flat against the wall), while the flat tops (shown as the two lighter rectangles in the diagram, right) are those parts which are physically nearest to the viewer but which appear, in the picture, to be in the distance at the end of the buildings.

Hughes' reverspective is the subject of papers on the psychology of perception, by Nicholas Wade and Thomas Papathomas of Rutgers University's Laboratory of Vision Research. More recently, Hughes has been working on a new kind of perspective he calls solid hollows where the reverspective object stands alone without a frame.

== Writing ==
Hughes has written four books investigating themes that parallel his art. His latest is Paradoxymoron: Foolish Wisdom in Words and Pictures, published in 2011. His other books are Vicious Circles and Infinity: A Panoply of Paradoxes (with artist George Brecht); Upon the Pun: Dual Meaning in Words and Pictures, with Paul Hammond (London, W.H. Allen, 1978); and More on Oxymoron (Jonathan Cape, Ltd. 1984) which investigates both verbal and visual oxymoron. He has written for The Observer, The Guardian and ICA Magazine, among others, on art, artists and interesting lives. A collection of his writings, Left to Write, was published by Momentum in 2008. The third edition of John Slyce's Patrick Hughes: Perverspective was published in 2011, with a new afterword by Murray McDonald. Most recently, A New Perspective, a 240-page monograph with essays by Professor Dawn Adès, Professor Martin Kemp, Murray McDonald and Dr Thomas Papathomas, was published by Flowers Gallery in November 2014, followed by A Newer Perspective, in 2017.

== Bibliography ==
Exhibition catalogues

- Patrick Hughes: Multiples [catalogue of the exhibition Multispectives held at Flowers East 26 October – 24 November 2012] London.
- Patrick Hughes: The Prints in Between 1983 – 1995 [catalogue of the exhibition held at Flowers East 19 October – 17 November 2007] London.
- Patrick Hughes: Superduperspective [catalogue of the exhibition held at Flowers East 2006] London.
- Whopperspective [catalogue of the exhibition held at Flowers East 2003] London.
- Patrick Hughes: Properspective [catalogue of the exhibition held at Flowers East 10 February – 10 March 2001] London.
- Patrick Hughes: Deeperspective [catalogue of the exhibition held at Flowers East 22 October – 21 November 1999] London.
- Patrick Hughes: Retrospectives [catalogue of the exhibition held at Flowers East 19 October – 17 November 1994] London.

Monographs

- Ades, D., Kemp, M, Papathomas, T. et al. (2014) A New Perspective. Reverspective Ltd, London
- Hughes, P. (2011) Paradoxymoron: Foolish Wisdom in Words and Pictures. Reverspective Ltd, London.
- Slyce, J. (2011) Patrick Hughes: Perverspective. Momentum, London.

== See also ==
- Ripple pictures
