= Double Diamond Burton Pale Ale =

British beer

Double Diamond dispenser in Whitelock's Ale House in Leeds

Double Diamond Burton Pale Ale is an English pale ale, first brewed in 1876 by Samuel Allsopp & Sons. It was one of the highest selling beers in the United Kingdom in the 1950s, 1960s and 1970s.

== History ==
Samuel Allsopp & Sons of Burton upon Trent first brewed Double Diamond in 1876 as an India Pale Ale. Allsopp merged with Ind Coope in 1935. Bottled Double Diamond began to be advertised heavily from 1946, becoming one of four nationally distributed beers by the 1950s. Under reciprocal trading agreements Ind Coope would agree to stock a rival brewer's beer if they replaced their supply of Bass or Worthington with Double Diamond. The keg version was launched in the 1960s, and in the 1960s and the 1970s it was advertised heavily by Ind Coope, especially on TV, with the tagline: "A Double Diamond works wonders".

Carlsberg UK discontinued off-trade sales in 2003, although it continues as a keg beer. Paul Burrell claimed that small scale production continued as Prince Philip drank a small bottle nightly. The keg version is currently known as Double Diamond Pale and is 3.8% ABV. Ind Coope Burton Ale (4.5% ABV), a cask conditioned version of bottled Double Diamond first brewed in 1976, is currently produced by Carlsberg UK.

In 2025, the beer was relaunched, brewed by Kirkstall Brewery for Allsop Brewery. It is 3.8% and available in 440ml cans.
