= Jeffrey Bernard =

English journalist (1932–1997)

- Bernard in the mid-1980s
- Born: 27 May 1932; Hampstead, London, England
- Died: 4 September 1997 (aged 65); Soho, London, England
- Occupation: Journalist

Jeffrey Joseph Bernard (/bərˈnɑːrd/; 27 May 1932 – 4 September 1997) was an English journalist, best known for his weekly column "Low Life" in The Spectator magazine, and also notorious for a feckless and chaotic career and life of alcohol abuse.

He became associated with the louche and bohemian atmosphere that existed in London's Soho district and was later immortalised in the comical play Jeffrey Bernard Is Unwell by Keith Waterhouse. He was played by his friend Peter O'Toole when the play first opened. The title refers to a notice The Spectator would put in the place of Bernard's column on occasions in which he was unable to write.

== Life ==
Bernard was born in Hampstead, London, and was the youngest of the three sons of the English architect Oliver Percy Bernard (1881–1939) and his opera singer wife Edith Dora Hodges (1896–1950). His siblings were the poet Oliver Bernard, and the photographer Bruce Bernard. He was a paternal cousin to the actor Stanley Holloway.

Bernard attended Pangbourne College for two years before his parents responded to the college's protest that he was "psychologically unsuitable for public school life". He later briefly served in the British Army but went AWOL.

=== Soho ===
Even while at school, Bernard had begun to explore Soho and Fitzrovia at the age of 14 with his brother Bruce. Seduced by the area's lurid glamour, he moved there at 16, supporting himself in a variety of jobs that were at odds with his middle-class background, including boxing booth attendant, building labourer, dishwasher, stagehand, kitchen assistant and coal miner. His fellow miners mocked him for bringing his lunch wrapped up in pages from The Times.

As a stagehand, Bernard worked at The Old Vic, where he met actress Jackie Ellis, until he was fired for drunkenness. He soon got a job at the Folies Bergere show, sticking stars on the dancers' nipples. He later took up photography with the encouragement of his second wife Jackie Ellis, and often collaborated with his best friend Frank Norman.

In 1962, Norman and Bernard worked together on a collection of writing and photography based on Soho, called Soho Night and Day. "I think we were drunk for a year," Bernard later reflected. The duo obtained an advance of £100 for the collection, but Bernard lost his payment playing roulette.

By this time, Bernard became a regular at The Coach and Horses, as well as The Colony Room and The French House. He came to favour The Coach and Horses in later life, particularly after Muriel Belcher, the proprietor of The Colony Room and a friend of Bernard's, died. Bernard did not get along well with Ian Board, who took over The Colony Room from Belcher.

Bernard took racing bets for his friends and infamous pub landlord Norman Balon. This eventually landed Bernard in trouble. He was arrested for illegal betting practices and pleaded guilty to taking illegal bets in 1986. The arresting officers invited Bernard to their Christmas party.

Over the years, Bernard built a circle of friends and associates that included Tom Baker, John Hurt, Daniel Farson and John Deakin. He also knew Dylan Thomas, Francis Bacon, Lucian Freud, John Minton, Nina Hamnett, Graham Greene and Ian Fleming.

=== Love life ===
Bernard married four times, Anna Grace in 1952, Jackie Ellis in 1959, Jill Stanley in 1966 and Susan Ashley Gluck in 1978. He often remarked, only half in jest, that alcohol was the other woman. He was a womaniser and had numerous affairs. His drinking, gambling, violence and infidelities ensured each marriage failed. His third wife, Jill Stanley divorced Bernard in 1973. He sought treatment for alcoholism and was sober for two years before returning to the bottle.

Bernard and Stanley had a daughter together, Isabel Bernard. Despite rumours to the contrary, Jeffrey Bernard was Isabel's father. Graham Lord who wrote the book "Just the One", where this rumour began, was asked by Bernard's family not to attend the funeral due to all the lies published in the book. Bernard and Gluck divorced in 1980. He later described her as "my fourth, last and most angry wife". He did not remarry.

== Writing ==
Elizabeth Smart suggested that Bernard try journalism and he started to write about his interest in horseracing in Queen magazine in 1964. Bernard was sent to interview Prince Monolulu while he was in hospital. He took Monolulu some chocolates and gave him a strawberry cream chocolate; Monolulu choked to death.

He later became racing correspondent for the satirical magazine Private Eye and became a columnist for Sporting Life in October 1970. In 1971, Bernard was at Royal Ascot when he vomited on the Queen Mother's shoes.

Bernard was given a column in The Spectator in 1975. His column became "Low Life" in 1978, set up to contrast with the "High Life" column by wealthy socialite Taki Theodoracopulos, writing as "Taki". While Taki's column described a life of yachts, casinos and grand hotels, Bernard's was described by Jonathan Meades as a "suicide note in weekly instalments" and principally chronicled his daily round of intoxication and dissipation in The Coach and Horses pub and its fateful consequences.

This was mixed with anecdotes, many of which were repeated in the play Jeffrey Bernard Is Unwell, and ponderings on life. His life had an inevitable effect on his health and reliability and the magazine often had to post the notice "Jeffrey Bernard is unwell" in place of his column.

== Decline and death ==
Bernard was an unrepentant alcoholic for most of his adult life apart from two years of sobriety in the 1970s. His drinking affected Bernard's health more seriously. He was hospitalised for detoxification, he suffered from pancreatitis for many years and later developed diabetes. He often forgot to take insulin regularly and his right leg was amputated due to the resulting complications. Instead of the regular notice, The Spectator announced, "Jeffrey Bernard has had his leg off".

Bernard died at his home in Soho at the age of 65 on 4 September 1997 of renal failure, after turning down further treatment by dialysis. In 1999, he was succeeded as The Spectator's Low Life columnist by Jeremy Clarke.

== Bibliography ==
- Obituaries:
  - The Scotsman, 6 September 1997
  - The Independent, 6 September 1997
  - The Times, 8 September 1997
  - The Daily Telegraph, 8 September 1997

- Bernard, J., Low Life 1987, Pan Books
- Bernard, J., More Low Life 1989, Pan Books ISBN 0-330-31295-2
- Bernard, J. (1996). Reach for the Ground: The Downhill Struggle of Jeffrey Bernard. London: Duckworth. ISBN 0-7156-3150-0.
- Bernard, Oliver (1992). Getting Over It: Recollections. London: Peter Owen. ISBN 0-7206-0865-1.
- Lord, Graham (1993). Just the One: The Wives and Times of Jeffrey Bernard 1932-1997 (New ed.). London: Headline. ISBN 0-7472-6004-4.
- Holloway, Stanley; Richards, Dick (1967). Wiv a little bit o' luck: The life story of Stanley Holloway. London: Frewin. OCLC 3647363.
- Waterhouse, Keith (2004). "Bernard, Jeffrey Joseph (1932–1997)". Oxford Dictionary of National Biography (online ed.). Oxford University Press. doi:10.1093/ref:odnb/68104. (Subscription, Wikipedia Library access or UK public library membership required.)
