= Henrietta Moraes =

English model and memoirist

- Early or mid-1960s photograph of Moraes by John Deakin
- Born: Audrey Wendy Abbott; 22 May 1931
- Died: 6 January 1999 (aged 67)
- Occupations: Artists' model, memoirist
- Spouse(s): Michael Law; Norman Bowler; Dom Moraes
- Partner: Maggi Hambling
- Children: 2

Henrietta Moraes (born Audrey Wendy Abbott; 22 May 1931 – 6 January 1999) was a British artists' model and memoirist. In the 1950s and 1960s, she was the muse and inspiration for many artists of the Soho subculture, including Lucian Freud, Francis Bacon, and much later, Maggi Hambling.

She was known for her three marriages and numerous love affairs. She left her first husband, Michael Law, and married actor Norman Bowler, with whom she had two children. She later married the Indian writer Dom Moraes.

== Early life and modelling in the 1950s ==
She was born Audrey Wendy Abbott in Simla, British India, where her father was stationed in the Indian Air Force. Her father deserted her mother when Audrey was young, and she was raised harshly by a tyrannical, abusive grandmother in England. Later she went to secretarial college.

By 1950, when she was age 19, Moraes was working as an artists' model in several London art schools. A visitor of the Colony Room Club, Soho, she became the muse to a number of important British artists in the early 1950s to the mid-1960s.

Francis Bacon, who was particularly enthralled by her mercurial character, painted her at least 16 times from photographs specifically commissioned by him from John Deakin. In May 2002, Bacon's Study for Portrait of Henrietta Moraes was sold by Ernst Beyeler for $6.7 million. In February 2012, Bacon's 1963 Portrait of Henrietta Moraes sold for £21.3 million. Lucian Freud, with whom she had an affair, painted Moraes at least three times, including a celebrated 1953 portrait entitled Girl in a Blanket.

In 1950, she met her first husband, film-maker Michael Law, who bestowed the name Henrietta on her. They set up home in an attic in Dean Street. Her second husband was bodybuilder and actor Norman Bowler. They had two children, Joshua (born 1955) and Caroline. Joshua was later revealed to be the biological son of Colin Tennant, 3rd Baron Glenconner. This marriage ended in 1956.

Later in 1956, she met the 18-year-old Indian poet Dom Moraes. They married in 1961. They amicably divorced by the mid-1960s.

== Into the hippie and drug scenes in the 1960s ==
Moraes was notoriously free-spirited and led a generally hedonistic lifestyle. In the early 1960s, Moraes began to take drugs in addition to her large intake of alcohol. After her death, Tim Hilton speculated that this was the result of sitting through the Eichmann trial in Jerusalem in 1961 together with her journalist husband Dom Moraes, who had been sent there by The Times of India.

In the 1960s, Moraes left the art world and joined the hippie scene. She reportedly consumed every drug except heroin, and lost the Chelsea house that John Minton had left to her after his death in 1957. In the 1960s, an unsuccessful burglary, hampered by amphetamine psychosis, led to time in Holloway Prison. Anticipating her decline, Bacon famously painted her with a syringe a decade before she became a self-confessed "junkie".

== Back in London in the 1970s, and in Ireland in the 1980s ==
In the mid-1970s, Moraes shared a mews flat in Hanover Terrace, Regent's Park, London, with singer and actress Marianne Faithfull, an episode in both their lives that forms a key chapter in Faithfull's Memories Dreams & Reflections, published in October 2007. In the late 1970s and early 1980s Moraes was caretaker of Roundwood House, near Mountrath, County Laois, Ireland, which was being restored by the Irish Georgian Society. Many friends visited, and her friend Eric Burdon recorded Darkness Darkness there. Guinness heiress Caroline Blackwood discreetly paid school fees for Moraes's two children during her most untethered years, but Henrietta was not told about it.

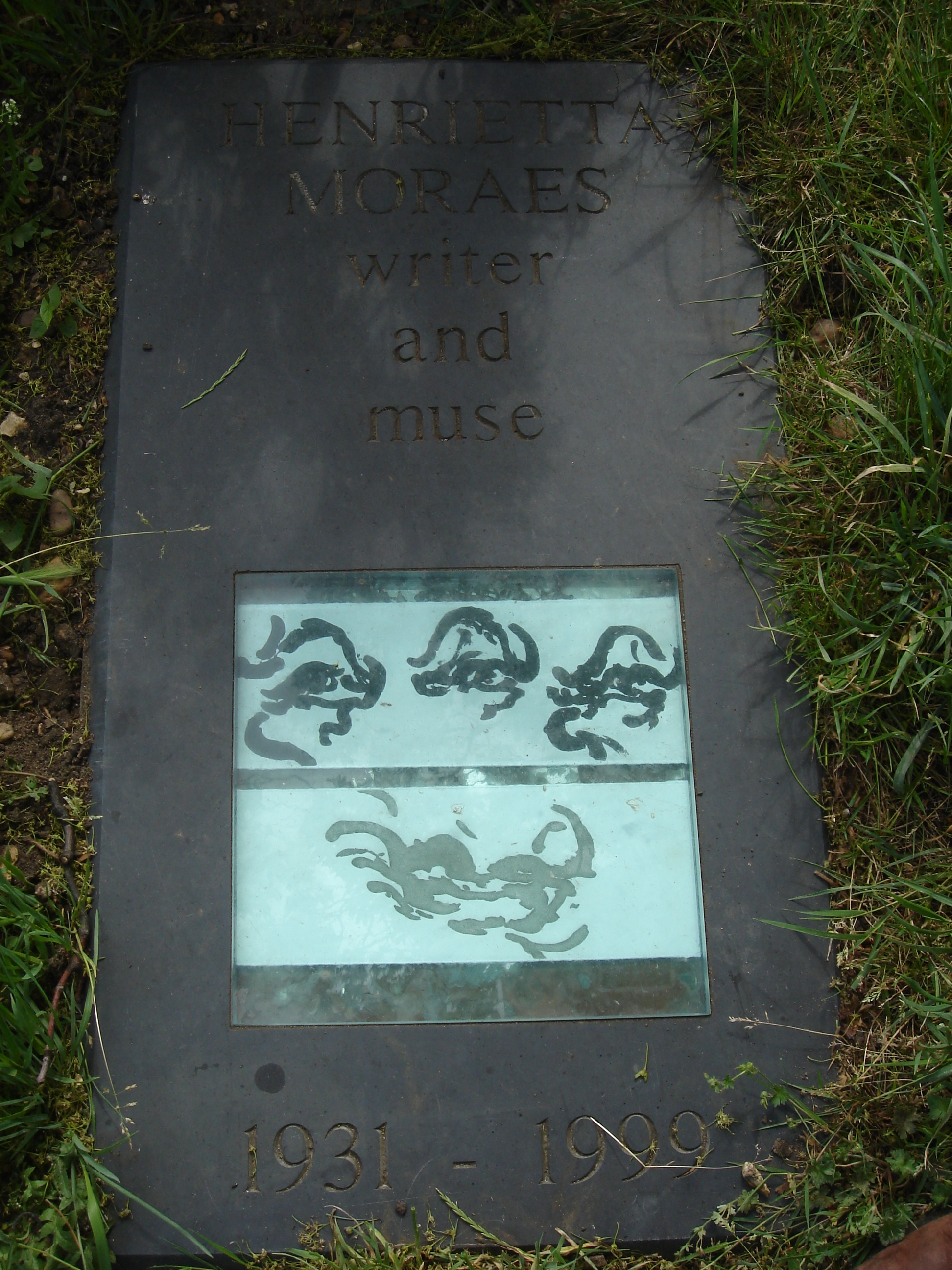
Funerary monument, Brompton Cemetery, London

== The last years: a sober life and her memoir Henrietta ==
She spent her final years in London. She started to write about her life in the book Henrietta, published by Hamish Hamilton in 1994, and was working on a follow-up at the time of her death. This volume of short stories and memoirs was written with the encouragement of her friend, the writer Francis Wyndham. She was diagnosed with diabetes soon after becoming a keen gardener in West London. In her last year of life, she was in a relationship with artist Maggi Hambling, who produced a posthumous volume of charcoal portraits of her.

== Death ==
Moraes died in London in 1999 at the age of 67 in her bed while on the phone to her doctor, bequeathing her long-haired dachshund dog Max to Hambling. She left only a handful of possessions and a large pile of unpaid bills.

She is buried in Brompton Cemetery, London. Her coffin was hand-made by her friend Sir Mark Palmer. Mourners included Palmer's wife Catherine Tennant, the designer David Mlinaric and his wife Martha, Penny Guinness, the antiques dealer Christopher Gibbs, and her literary agent Alexandra Pringle. She had spent time with Palmer in the early 1970s in his "cavalcade of horse-drawn caravans" as part of an aristocratic early group of New Age travellers.
