= Jeffrey Bernard Is Unwell =

1989 play written by Keith Waterhouse

- Written by: Keith Waterhouse
- Based on: life and writings of Jeffrey Bernard

Premiere
- Date: 1989
- Place: Apollo Theatre

Jeffrey Bernard Is Unwell is a play by Keith Waterhouse about real-life journalist Jeffrey Bernard. Bernard was still alive at the time the play was first performed in the West End in 1989.

== Background ==
Bernard wrote the "Low Life" column in The Spectator. The play's title refers to the magazine's habit of printing a one-line apology on a blank page when he was too drunk or hung-over to produce the required copy and a substitute article could not be found before the deadline for publication. Its premise is that Bernard has found himself locked in overnight at his favourite public house, The Coach and Horses, and uses the occasion to share anecdotes from his life with the audience. A highlight of the play is a trick involving a glass of water, a matchbox, and an egg which must remain unbroken at the end of the trick. This trick is more fully described in an obituary of Keith Waterhouse in The Guardian.

== Original run ==
Often remembered as a one-man show, but in fact packed with characters performed by a supporting cast of four, Jeffrey Bernard Is Unwell was a vehicle for its original star Peter O'Toole. The show opened in Brighton in September 1989, moved to Bath and made its triumphant London debut at the Apollo Theatre in Shaftesbury Avenue in October.

O'Toole also appeared in a later revival at the Old Vic. The Old Vic run was sold out, and on 23 August 1999 the London Evening Standard published a 'Bluffer's Guide' to enable readers to pretend they had seen it: "thereby allowing dinner party conversations and watercooler debates to run their course unhindered by ignorance."

A filmed version of the stage play was shot at the Old Vic Theatre with a live audience, and was released in both full and abridged versions.

== Later versions ==
O'Toole was followed in the part by Tom Conti, who starred in a revival of the play until September 2006 at the Garrick Theatre in London. The part has also been played by James Bolam, Dennis Waterman, Robert Powell and more recently Simon Hill in the Frayed Knot Production of the play.

A radio adaptation starring Sir John Hurt was broadcast on BBC Radio 4 on 15 August 2015 and repeated on 18 February 2017 following the death of Hurt.

The play's American premiere was in 1993 at the Kavinoky Theatre in Buffalo, NY. It starred David Lamb and was directed by Robert Waterhouse, the author's son. Keith Waterhouse attended the preview and gave a single note, about a sound cue. He cites it as his favourite 'out of town production' in his memoir, Streets Ahead. The team reprised the production in 2004.

In May 2019, the play was adapted as a one man show performed in The Coach and Horses, starring Robert Bathurst with the adaptation and direction by James Hillier. The production, running from May 7 to June 1, featured Saturday evening performances starting at midnight, followed by a traditional Soho "lock in" until 5:00 a.m. The sold-out production was extended with additional performances. The site specific version with Bathurst once again in the title role was revived at The Coach and Horses in October & November 2023 and extended to February 2024.
