= Ian Board =

English bar owner

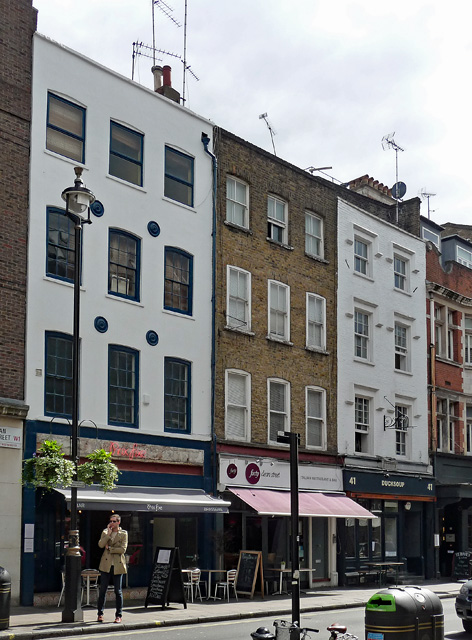
The Colony Room Club was located at 41 Dean Street, at the far right

Ian David Archibald Board (16 December 1929 – 26 June 1994) was an English nightclub owner who ran The Colony Room Club in Dean Street in London's Soho district, from 1981 to 1994, having taken it over from Muriel Belcher who founded the private drinking club in 1948.

== Early life ==
Board grew up in a poor family in Exeter, and his mother died when he was four years old. He liked neither his father nor his stepmother, and, as a teenager, he ran away to London. On arrival, he went to Speakers' Corner and picked up a man and lived with him for some weeks. He later worked as a commis waiter in Soho's Greek Street.

== Career ==
Board served behind the bar at the Colony Room Club for 46 years, initially as Belcher's barman, and after she died as its proprietor.

He assiduously cultivated the custom of artists including Francis Bacon, Lucian Freud, Michael Andrews, and Barry Flanagan. One night, he ejected Bacon from the premises with the words, "Get out! Call yourself a painter. You can't fucking paint. Take your boring friends with you and don't bother coming back."

Board was known for carrying on Belcher's tradition of obscene language, with tirades to drunken customers such as "Look at you, you great lump, just take a look at yourself. You're a sad and pathetic sight. For fuck's sake, pull yourself together..."

Board was gay, and the club under Belcher, herself a lesbian, had always been a safe space to be openly homosexual. However, it was never exclusively so, and as Board said, "I don't mind those poofs, as long as they keep their distance."

Aged 60, Board stopped drinking brandy for breakfast but continued to drink vodka at home in the morning and, from noon to 11 pm, would consume vodka and brandy at the club.

Michael Wojas worked there as a barman and "Board's sidekick" for 13 years and was bequeathed the club by Board at his 1994 death.

== Personal life ==
Board died from cirrhosis, on 26 June 1994.
