= John Maybury =

English filmmaker and artist

John Maybury (born 25 March 1958) is an English filmmaker and artist. In 2005 he was named as one of the 100 most influential gay and lesbian people in Britain. Maybury is particularly known for his underground aesthetics and his experimental editing and directorial choices.

== Early life and education ==
John Maybury grew up in North London, England. He has described his own upbringing as challenging, growing up around abusive and alcoholic parents. He studied at North East London Polytechnic and later went to St. Martin's College to study painting. While studying, in the late 1970s, he began to experiment with film and filmmaking. Influenced primarily by filmmakers such as Kenneth Anger, Maya Deren and Stan Brakhage, as well as artists such as Andy Warhol and John Cocteau, Maybury began experimenting with video art. This led him to the beginning of his relationship with artist Derek Jarman: Jarman, who he'd met at St. Martin's, asked Maybury to work with him on his film Jubilee in set design and in costume work. Following Jubilee's completion, Maybury continued to work with Jarman in the creation of video art and short films, which he describes as pivotal to his later filmmaking.

== Life and career ==
=== Short Films and Video Art ===
Maybury's first released short film, "The Dream Machine", served as an anthology of the short films he had created prior alongside Jarman, with the films themselves being credited to both.

Maybury's first widely released film was 1994's Remembrance of Things Fast: True Stories Visual Lies, an hour-long experimental feature. Fitting with the reference to Marcel Proust's Remembrance of Things Past, the film presents the progression of film as a genre and the changing of its perception and reception. The film received mostly positive reviews for Maybury's unique style of direction.

Throughout the early 1980s, Maybury's film work also began to be exhibited in galleries, such as the ICA London. Later in the 1980s, Maybury produced a number of short films and music videos including for Sinéad O'Connor's "Nothing Compares 2 U", which was voted #35 in a Channel 4 poll of the greatest pop music videos and received various awards.

=== Films ===
In 1998, Maybury produced his first full-length feature, Love Is the Devil: Study for a Portrait of Francis Bacon, a biopic on the life of painter Francis Bacon starring Derek Jacobi and Daniel Craig. The film received positive reviews from publications like RogerEbert.com, praising the film for, in spite of its lack of adherence to a standard plot, its successes at capturing the visual stylings of Francis Bacon (who had also been an inspiration to Maybury prior in his work). The film was screened in the Un Certain Regard section at the 1998 Cannes Film Festival.

In 2005, he directed The Jacket with Adrien Brody and Keira Knightley, a thriller which follows a Gulf War veteran in a mental institution. The Jacket received mixed reviews; Roger Ebert in a piece for the Chicago Sun-Times primarily criticized the film's lack of cohesive plot, writing: "You can sense an impulse toward a better film, and Adrien Brody and Keira Knightley certainly take it seriously, but the time-travel whiplash effect sets in, and it becomes, as so many time travel movies do, an exercise in early entrances, late exits, futile regrets." In 2008, his film The Edge of Love, a biopic on the life of Welsh poet Dylan Thomas, starring Sienna Miller, Cillian Murphy, Matthew Rhys, and Keira Knightley, premiered, opening at the Edinburgh Film Festival.

=== Filmography as director ===
- Remembrance of Things Fast: True Stories Visual Lies (1994) - also writer
- Love Is the Devil: Study for a Portrait of Francis Bacon (1998) - also writer
- The Jacket (2005)
- The Edge of Love (2008)
