= What Rough Beast =

"What Rough Beast" is a phrase taken from the 1919 W. B. Yeats poem The Second Coming and has been used as the title for several works of fiction and non-fiction.

== Fiction ==
- "What Rough Beast", a 1958 science fiction story by Damon Knight, reprinted in the collection Off Center
- What Rough Beast, a 1980 science fiction novel by William John Watkins
- "What Rough Beast", a 1989 episode of Beauty and the Beast, written by George R. R. Martin
- "What Rough Beast", a 2010 story by Matthew Baugh in Tales of the Shadowmen, Volume 7: Femmes Fatales
- "What Rough Beast", a 2023 episode of Mayfair Witches, written by Esta Spalding

== Non-fiction ==
- What rough beast? A biographical fantasia on the life of Professor J.R. Neave, otherwise known as Ironfoot Jack, a 1939 biography of Iron Foot Jack by Mark Benney (born Henry Ernest Degras)
- What Rough Beast?: Images of God in the Hebrew Bible, a 1990 book about religion by David Penchansky

== See also ==
- Rough Beast: My Story and the Reality of Sinn Féin, 2023 memoir by Máiría Cahill.
