= Munzner =

Munzner is a surname. Notable people with the surname include:

- Aribert Munzner (born 1930), German-American abstract painter
- Christian Münzner (born 1981), a German guitarist
- Jörg Münzner (born 1960), an Austrian equestrian and Olympic medalist
- Tamara Munzner (born 1969), an American-Canadian scientist
