= The Caravan Club (Endell Street) =

LGBT-friendly club in London, United Kingdom

Coordinates: 51.5154°N 0.1262°W

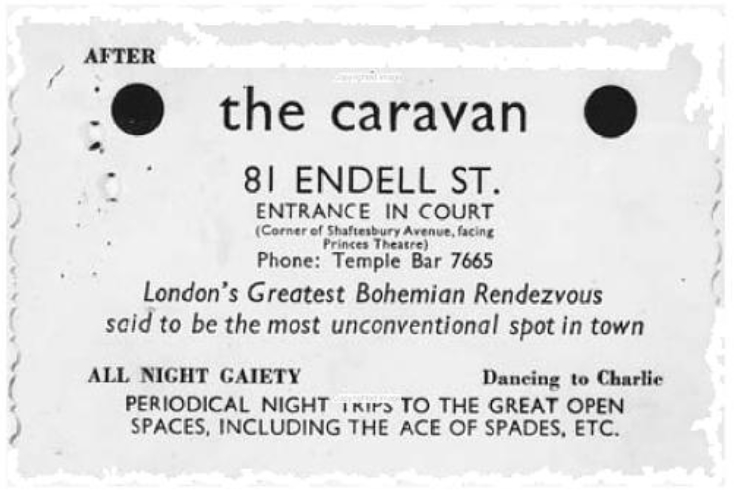
Advertising for the Caravan Club, 1934

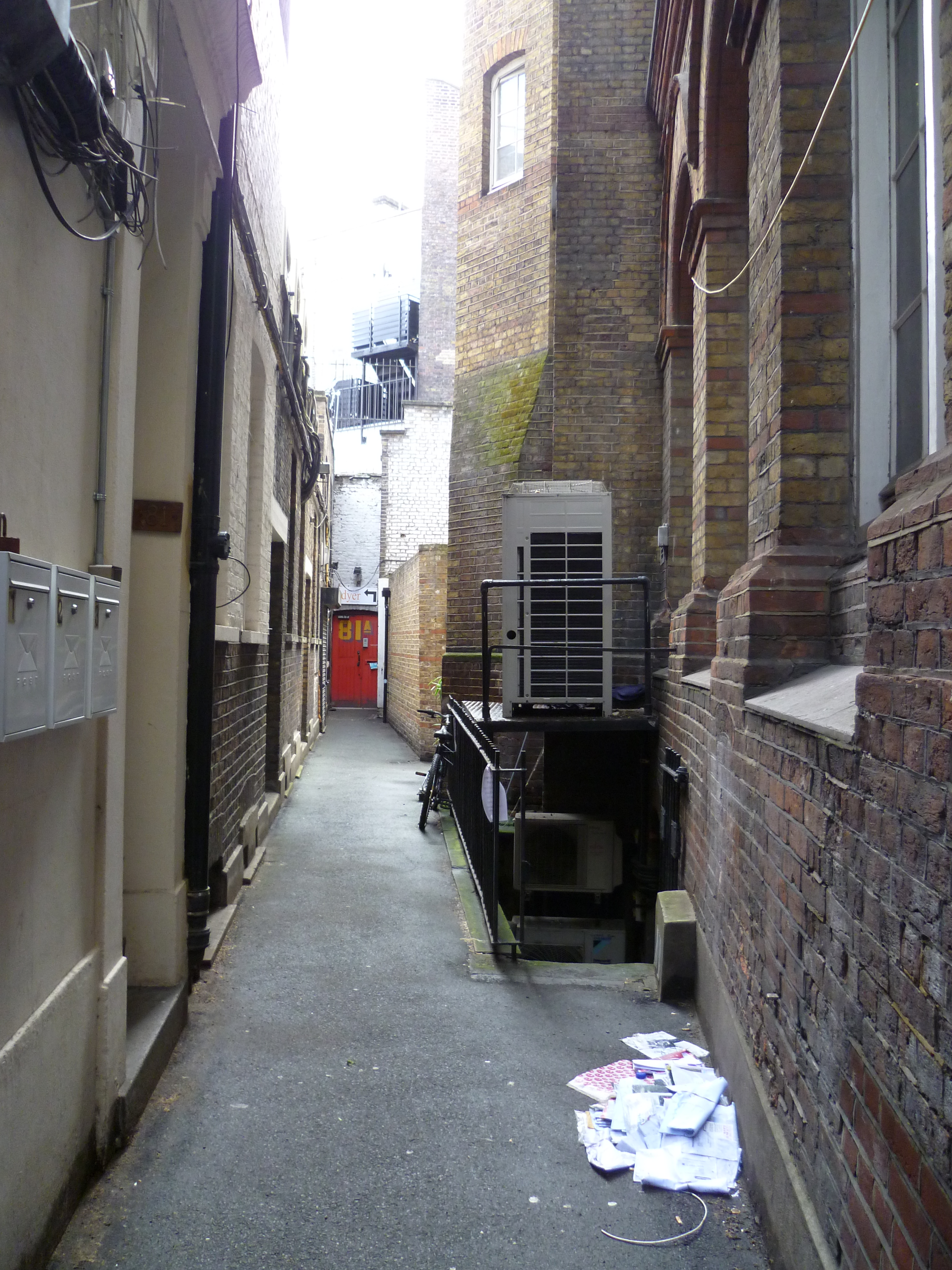
The alleyway down which the club may have been.

The Caravan Club was a gay and lesbian-friendly club in the basement of 81 Endell Street, London, that was the subject of a sensational court case in 1934. Following a police raid, the club's owners were accused of "exhibiting to the view of any person willing to pay for admission lewd and scandalous performances". The Caravan Club was one of a number of similar venues in London's West End in the inter-war years.

== Background ==
The club opened on 14 July 1934. It advertised itself as "London's Greatest Bohemian Rendezvous said to be the most unconventional spot in town" – a code phrase for being gay-friendly – and promised "All night gaiety" and "Dancing to Charlie".

The Caravan Club was run by Jack Neave (or Neaves) (aged 48) of Robert Street, London NW, known as "Iron Foot Jack" as he wore a metal device on his boot to lengthen his right leg, and was frequented by both gay men and lesbian women. Neave had previously run the Jamset and the Cosmopolitan (Wardour Street) in the early 1930s and was a former escapologist and "strongman", later described in court as a phrenologist.

There was also a criminal element and the club was financed by William (Billy) Joseph Clifford Reynolds (aged 24) of Crowndale Road, London NW, who it later emerged had four criminal convictions. It was claimed that Reynolds had received an inheritance of £300 from his grandfather which enabled him to finance the club.

== Success ==
Neave paid a rent of £300 to take the premises, a large sum in 1934, but it was justified by the success of the venture. The club registered 445 members within its first six weeks, and was visited by 2004 people. Admission was 1s for members, or 1s 6d on the door. According to the account of a policeman, the walls and ceilings were decorated with material featuring stars and dragons and the entertainment included a man stripped to the waist who passed burning papers over his upper body. Sexual contact between men was accepted.

== Police interest and raid ==
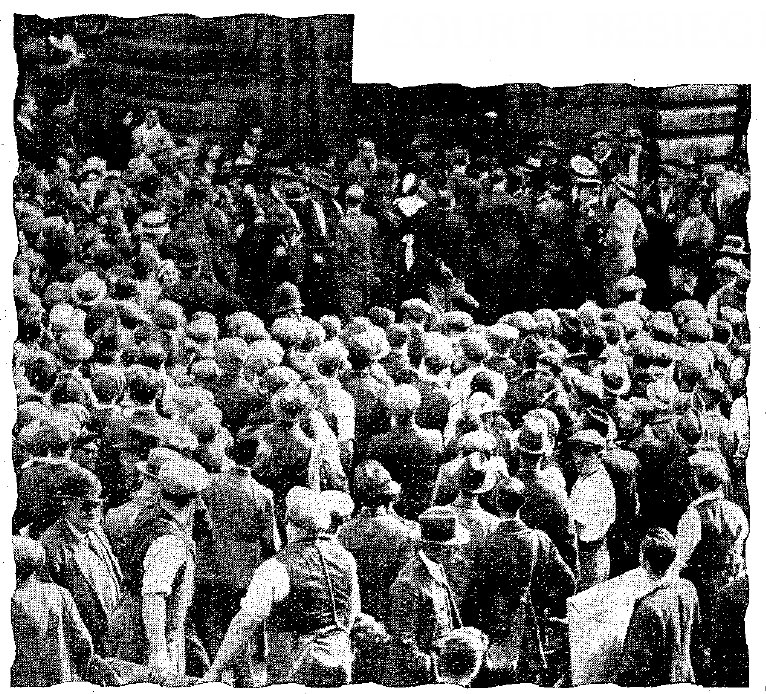
The scene outside Bow Street Magistrates' Court, 28 August 1934

The club came to the attention of the police almost immediately. There were letters from Holborn Council, and in August local residents complained "Its [sic] absolutely a sink of iniquity". The club was put under observation and plain clothes officers visited on 25, 26 and 27 July. One constable reported that the majority of those dancing on the floor were male couples. He entered into conversation with a man named "Josephine". On one of the visits, present were 40 men and 26 women, 39 of the men being described officially as of the "importuning type" and 18 of the women as of the "prostitute class". The club was raided in the early morning of 25 August and 103 people arrested. Also found was a cache of weapons including firearms.

The subsequent proceedings locally at Bow Street Magistrates' Court caused a sensation, with crowds of up to 500 gathered outside the court once the nature of the charges became known. The police were forced to intervene to keep the road open. The crowd was made up a large number of porters from Covent Garden Market as well as passers by and office workers. Workmen on the roof of the Royal Opera House opposite added to the noise. As each defendant arrived they were met with calls from the crowd such as "What ho, Gerald" or for women, "Ere comes Tilly". There was laughter and a cheer as each entered the building.

The court was locked and the public barred from entry. Inside, the defendants were arranged in rows, the women at the front. The Daily Mirror reported that reading the names of the defendants took ten minutes, "many of the girls giggling as they answered", and there were nine barristers and three solicitors present. According to the Mirror, "All the girls were young, well dressed and pretty. Among the male defendants were two commissionaires in uniform."

Neave and Reynolds were accused of "maintaining a place at Endell-street for exhibiting to the view of any person willing to pay for admission lewd and scandalous performances". They were represented by a young Derek Curtis-Bennett (who later defended William Joyce (Lord Haw Haw) and murderer John Christie). The other defendants were accused of "aiding and abetting". Neave and Reynolds denied that anything improper happened at the club saying that it was their job to ensure it did not but under oath Reynolds had to admit: "we have definitely quite queer people down there." A police officer testified that "Some men were made up like women and acted like women. One started to dance as a woman would be expected to dance. Men were cuddling and embracing..." Constable Mortimer testified that he saw five men at the club who were known as "Cochran's Young Ladies". There were also two men known as Doreen and Henrietta. The officer was asked if they were present in the court to which he replied "Doreen, no. Henrietta, yes." to general laughter from the defendants.

No evidence was offered against seventy-six of the defendants and they were allowed to go, leaving the two principals and 25 other defendants who were ordered to appear for trial on 5 September 1934.

== The trial ==
The judge, Mr Henry Holman Gregory K.C., Recorder of London

By the time of the trial at the Old Bailey there were 22 defendants, including three women. Neave denied the suggestion that there was indecent dancing at the club. Miss Carmen Fernandez, a professional dancer, called as an "expert witness" by the defence, stated that the Rumba and the Carioca might be thought indecent by those who saw them for the first time by that they were danced at well known West End halls. She was asked by the defence to demonstrate the Rumba in front of the dock but was prevented from doing so by judge Holman Gregory, who commented "there will be nothing of the sort in this court." On 25 October, three of the minor figures were acquitted, including the accordionist who said that he concentrated only on playing his instrument.

The verdict in the trial was delivered on 26 October 1934. Neave was sentenced to 20 months' hard labour and Reynolds to 12 months' hard labour. William Dodd, a shop assistant got three months' hard labour. The rest of the defendants were either found not guilty or received much shorter sentences, which with time served resulted in their immediate release. They were mostly in their early twenties and the occupations included: artist, window dresser, waiter, messenger, dancing partner, painter, school master, traveller, milliner, clerk and salesman. In his final comments, the judge described the club as "A foul den of iniquity which was corrupting the youth of London"

The Daily Express described Neave as a man of striking appearance, "He has black hair, which hangs over his shoulders. He wore a frock coat, large black stock tie, and a soft frilled shirt front. He is a man of tremendous strength." As he went down to the cells to begin his sentence, "the heavy clamp-clamp of his boot could be heard".

== Significance ==
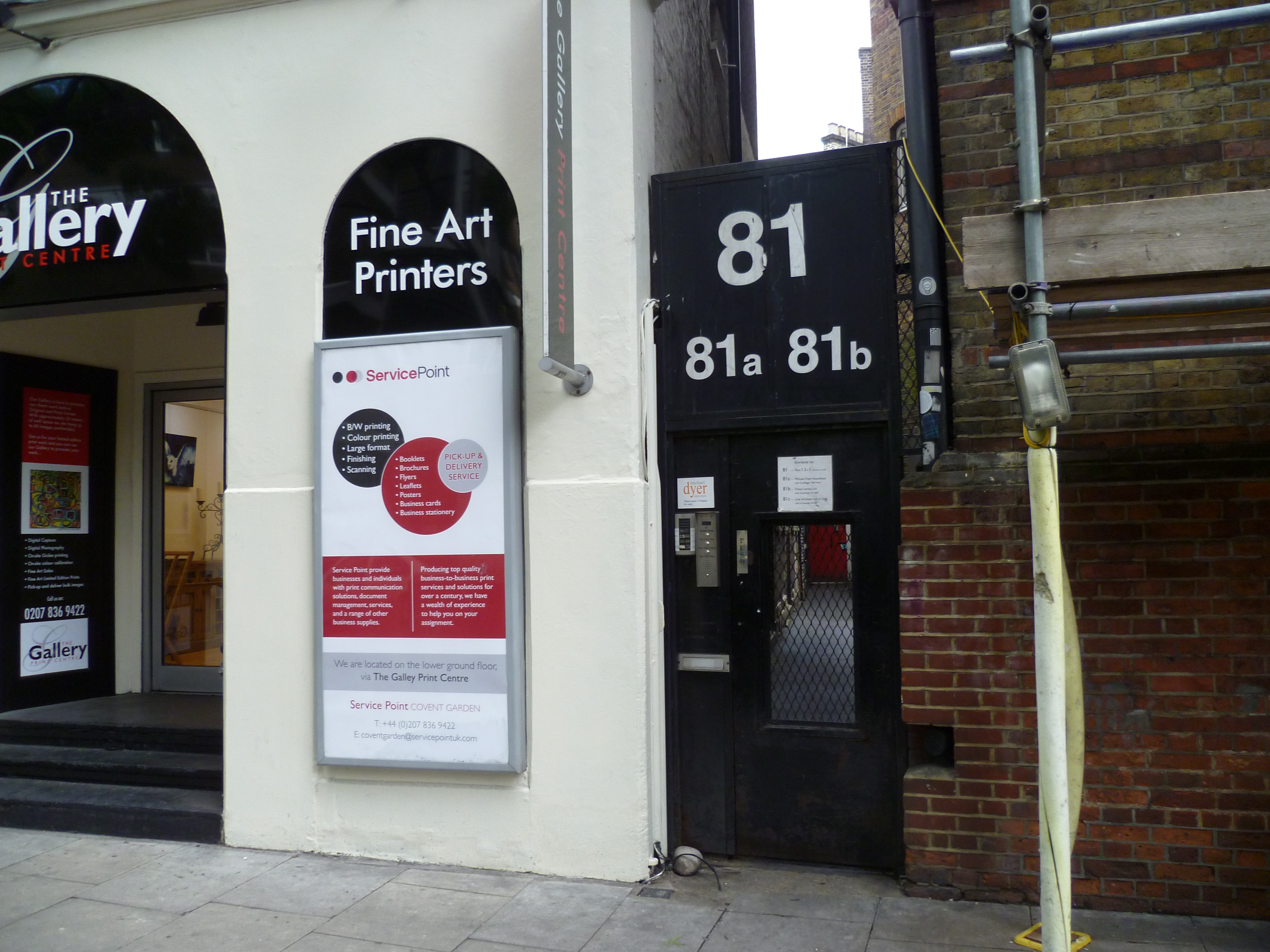
Entrance to 81 Endell Street today

The Caravan was one of a number of similar clubs in London's West End in the inter-war years that were among the principal gathering places of gay men and often included an element of female prostitution and low-level criminality. All were vulnerable to attention from the police, though in practice this tended to happen only if third parties such as morality crusaders or official bodies asked the police to intervene. The Ministry of Defence in particular was concerned to prevent servicemen visiting such establishments and certain venues were patrolled by the Military Police and known to be off-limits but while registered pubs, restaurants and cafes could be entered freely by the police and their owners were approved before a licence was given, private clubs were harder to monitor as a senior officer's permission was required to place them under surveillance and a magistrate's warrant was needed in order to conduct a raid. Once closed, they could simply set up somewhere else under a new name. Neave, for instance, was already on his third club (at least) by the time he opened the Caravan in 1934.

In July 2024, a property developer proposed that a rainbow plaque be added to the Endell Street site, now known as The Sail Loft.
