= Soho Pam =

Pamela Jennings (1964–2012), known as Soho Pam, was a homeless English woman who became well known in Soho, London where she begged. She was much loved for her affectionate, polite manner and was the subject of artists and authors.

== Early life ==
She was born in Carshalton, Surrey, on 19 April 1964. Her siblings Michael and Susan, said that she was enthusiastic but accident-prone. She worked as a carer, shopgirl and played the bell lyre. She had mental health problems and, when her mother died in 1998, she became homeless and estranged from her remaining family.

== Homeless ==
An Early Christmas Present

Pam, the Fag (Note: Fag is British slang for "cigarette".) Lady, is one of the characters of Old Compton Street. A small, squat woman in her late fifties with closely cropped hair and "barn owl" glasses. Pam usually starts begging at midday and finishes once she's collected enough money for a packet of cigarettes and a bed for the night...

[she gives the author an unexpected present]

"Do you like it? Do you like it?" she cries, like a kid at Christmas. "I saved up for it!"
"But really, you shouldn't have."
"Well, we gotta look out for each other on this street", she reminds me, wagging her finger. Then she gives me a loving smile. "Now, can I have two pounds, please?"

— Dirty White Boy: Tales of Soho by Clayton Littlewood (2008)

As a homeless person, she needed £7 every day to pay for a bed in the hostel in Pimlico which she used. To finance this and her habits of gambling and smoking, she regularly begged in the nearby district of Soho where she became familiar to the bohemian community in drinking establishments such as the French House.

She was generally welcomed for her cheerful and affectionate nature, thanking benefactors with hugs and soft salutations such as "cuddle cuddle" and "love you". One exception was at the famous Coach and Horses where the landlord, Norman Balon, would chase her away. When he retired in 2006, she said, "I'll miss looking in the window to check whether he's in or not". The new landlord, Alistair Choat, was more friendly, allowing her two visits per day and inviting her to his wedding. He said that her manner was especially polite and engaging, "It was her very gentle approach, she would never demand anything and she would just ask sweetly. She had this rocking motion, where she would rock on her feet and then chat, and she would always be counting the money she had in her hand, over and over and over. Most importantly, she was quite petite, she was quite childlike, but she was always very polite, so she just ingratiated people."

Artists and authors such as Clayton Littlewood featured her in their work and she sold postcard portraits of herself painted by Rupert Shrive in 2005. She was addicted to tobacco and would scavenge cigarette butts for it. She gambled away her spare cash on fruit machines and by betting on dog racing but, when she had winnings, she was generous to her friends in the area. One friend who became close and looked after her was Sally Thomas. She would help Pam shop for clothes and reported that Pam became very nervous when leaving the familiar territory of Soho.

She gave up drinking around 2000 but later seemed to suffer from liver failure, giving her a jaundiced yellow skin which attracted attention that she enjoyed. The singer Suggs said that she'd been seen applying yellow make-up and so this may have been a ruse. He has written a song about her called Pam the Hawk and said, "She was an incredible character with a remarkable talent for getting money out of you. They say certain film stars have 'it', well if there is an 'it' for street people, she had it."

She was diagnosed with cancer by an ambulance medic outside the Bar Italia. She moved into sheltered housing in Maida Vale and had radiotherapy but died on 18 December 2012. Her funeral was at East Finchley Cemetery and then a wake was held back in Soho at the Coach and Horses. It was full to overflowing.

== See also ==
- Iron Foot Jack
- Simon Edy
