= The Cross Keys, Covent Garden =

Pub in Covent Garden, London

Coordinates: 51.514474°N 0.12485445°W

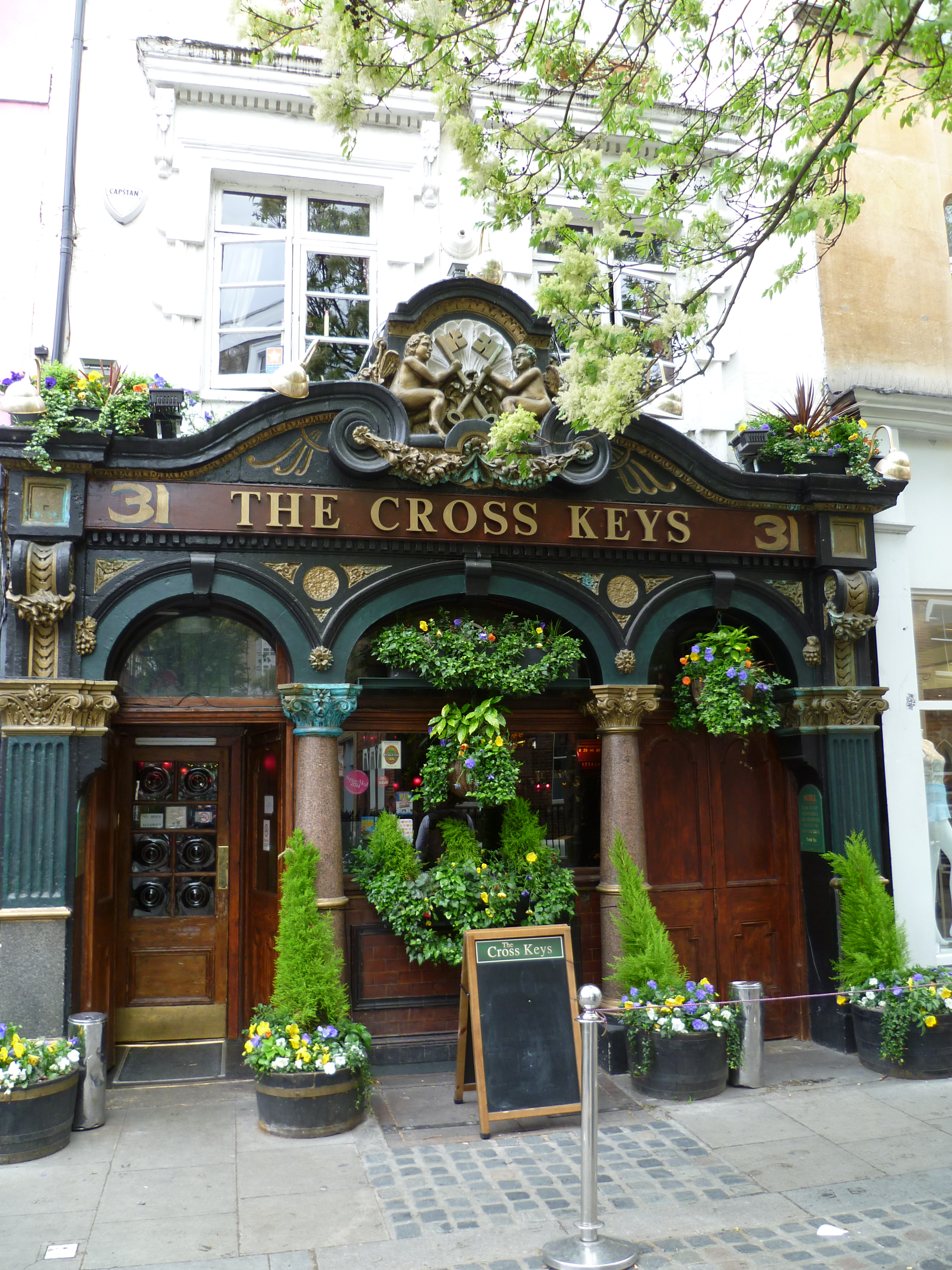
The Cross Keys

The Cross Keys is a Grade II listed public house at 31 Endell Street, Covent Garden, London W1.

It was built in 1848–49.
