= The Scarifyers =

UK audio, comic book series created 2007

- Genre: Audio Play/Comic Book
- Running time: Various
- Country of origin: United Kingdom
- Language: English
- Home station: BBC Radio 4 Extra
- Starring: Nicholas Courtney (2007–2010); Terry Molloy; David Warner (2011–2017)
- Created by: Simon Barnard
- Written by: Simon Barnard, Paul Morris
- Original release: August 2007 – present
- No. of series: 10
- Website: http://www.bafflegab.co.uk

The Scarifyers is an audio adventure and comic book series produced by Bafflegab Productions (formerly Cosmic Hobo Productions) and based on stories written by Simon Barnard and Paul Morris. Set in 1936 and 1937, it originally followed the exploits of DI Lionheart and ghost-story writer Professor Edward Dunning, as played by Nicholas Courtney and Terry Molloy.

Each adventure is a self-contained story and is released on CD and direct download. The first two stories, "The Nazad Conspiracy" and "The Devil of Denge Marsh", were broadcast on BBC7 in 2007. A third story, "For King and Country", guest-starring Gabriel Woolf, was released in early 2008 and broadcast in 2009. The fourth story "The Curse of the Black Comet", guest-starring Brian Blessed, was released in 2009 and broadcast in 2010. The fifth story, "The Secret Weapon of Doom", guest-starring Leslie Phillips and Nigel Havers, was released in 2010 and broadcast on BBC Radio 4 Extra in early 2012.

In 2011, after the death of actor Nicholas Courtney, it was announced that David Warner would be joining the series. His first Scarifyers story, "The Magic Circle", centred on the disappearance of Lionheart, and introduced new lead character Harry Crow, Lionheart's former police colleague. It was released in November 2011 and broadcast on BBC Radio 4 Extra in 2012. The seventh Scarifyers story, "The Horror of Loch Ness", was released in June 2012 and features the final performance of Philip Madoc. An eighth adventure, "The Thirteen Hallows" featuring Torchwood's Gareth David-Lloyd was released in December 2012. A ninth adventure, "The King of Winter", was released in October 2014, and guest-starred Guy Henry. The tenth story, "The Gnomes of Death" was released on 30 June 2017.

There is also a series of three short comic Scarifyers for Christmas stories: "Mr Crowley's Christmas", "The Yule Lads" and "The Curse of the Cult of Thoth", broadcast on Radio 4 Extra in 2010. During the Covid 19 lockdown they released a free story on 19 April 2020, The Scarifyers: "Cold Call".

Each play has featured cover artwork by Garen Ewing. The comic was written by Simon Barnard, and illustrated by 2000AD artist Simon Gurr.

== Audio plays ==
No.	Release date	Title	Synopsis	Written by
1	14 August 2006	"The Nazad Conspiracy"	Christmas 1936. Ghost story writer Professor Dunning (Terry Molloy) doesn't believe in the supernatural. So he's more than surprised when an invisible winged demon appears in his drawing room. The Metropolitan Police's longest-serving officer, Inspector Lionheart (Nicholas Courtney), doesn't believe in the supernatural either, wings or no wings. So he's less than impressed when Russian emigres begin dying impossible deaths all over London. Together, Lionheart and Dunning must face quarrelsome Generals, sinister clowns and Russian demons as they unravel the Nazad Conspiracy.	Simon Barnard
2	7 May 2007	"The Devil Of Denge Marsh"	In investigating the curious case of a melting scientist, MI-13 uncover a scientific project gripped by madness near a remote village on the Kent coast inhabited by locals with strange habits. Lionheart and Dunning must do battle with the Women's Institute, an old adversary and an inter-dimensional being from the dawn of time.	Paul Morris
3	5 May 2008	"For King And Country"	'Sir' Harry Price, self-proclaimed ghost detective, has built a machine to capture the spirits of the dead, if he can get his Price Ghost Captivator™ work. Meanwhile, Londoners are being killed, in especially gruesome fashion, with their own electrical appliances and the murderer is leaving cryptic messages in 17th century English at the scene.	Simon Barnard & Paul Morris
4	1 September 2009	"The Curse Of The Black Comet"	Sir Basil Champion (Brian Blessed) is the world's worst explorer. Having suffered being lost in the Kalahari among other adventures, he is finally eaten by a rhinoceros. MI-13 is called to investigate a mysterious outbreak of the Black Death at reading of Sir Basil's will. To discover the connection with his ill-fated Egyptian expedition fourteen years earlier Lionheart and Dunning journey from London to Scotland and then to the lost tombs of Egypt.	Simon Barnard & Paul Morris
5	8 November 2010	"The Secret Weapon Of Doom"	After an unfortunate bathchair accident, Professor Dunning (Terry Molloy) is temporarily invalided out of the Secret Service. But returning to his first love, writing, proves more perilous than expected. Meanwhile, unhinged MI-13 chief Colonel Black (Leslie Phillips) has a new case for Lionheart (Nicholas Courtney). Partnered with top spy - and housewives’ favourite - Victor Bright (Nigel Havers), Lionheart investigates the disappearance of a fabled super weapon - and discovers they aren't the only ones searching for it... Death stalks our heroes at every turn. Lionheart and Dunning must fight for their lives as dark forces gather around the mysterious Secret Weapon of Doom...	Simon Barnard & Paul Morris
6	1 November 2011	"The Magic Circle"	Professor Dunning (Terry Molloy)is finding the business of single-handedly saving Great Britain from the forces of darkness rather taxing. And Lionheart? Lionheart is missing. When the only clue to his disappearance seems to lie in a twenty-year-old murder investigation, Dunning turns to the one man who might have the answers: Lionheart's erstwhile colleague Harry ‘Thumper’ Crow (David Warner). Harry doesn't hold with supernaturalism, but over the next few days he's going to see some very strange things indeed: a string of murdered magicians, a dead music-hall star come back to life, and a pensioner from the depths of hell. Can Crow and Dunning find Lionheart? A terrible truth awaits, as they unearth the long-buried secrets of the Magic Circle.	Simon Barnard & Paul Morris
7	4 June 2012	"The Horror Of Loch Ness"	Sir Malcolm Campbell (played by Alex Lowe), the famous racer is practicing on Loch Ness for an attempt on the water speed record but disappears along with his boat in a mysterious bank of fog. MI:13's Harry Crow (David Warner) and Professor Dunning (Terry Molloy) go up to the loch-side village of Inverfarigaig to investigate. Aided by the local GP Dr Pippin (Philip Madoc), they discover a connection to the former "Laird of Boleskine and Abertarff" - the occultist Aleister Crowley (David Benson). Joined by Crowley, the investigations into Sir Malcolm's disappearance lead them into terrible danger, and an encounter with an old foe	Simon Barnard & Paul Morris
8	3 December 2012	"The Thirteen Hallows"	When a haunted chess set causes consternation at the British Chess Championships, and a horse magically materialises in Kettering Agricultural Museum, MI:13 are called to investigate. Harry Crow (David Warner) and Professor Dunning (Terry Molloy) follow the trail of inexplicable happenings to an unremarkable terraced house in South Wales, home to the mysterious Mr Merriman (David Benson). He's very old, and very mad; but is there more to Merriman than first appears? Meanwhile, in the South West of England, famed archaeologist Ralegh Radford (Ewan Bailey) is on the verge of the greatest discovery of the age. Britain's Tutankhamen, the press are calling it. But what he certainly isn't expecting to unearth is boisterous 1400-year-old knight Glewlwyd Gafaelfawr (Gareth David-Lloyd). As Crow and Dunning unravel an unlikely plot to resurrect Britain's greatest-ever hero, the race is on to stop sinister forces at home and abroad from finding the Thirteen Hallows.	Simon Barnard & Paul Morris
9	17 October 2014	"The King of Winter"	Midsummer, 1938. When a train porter is frozen to his living room chair (then nearly crowned Miss Croydon), MI-13's Harry Crow (David Warner) and Professor Dunning (Terry Molloy) are on the case. But what links the unfortunate porter to the equally glaciated peer-of-the-realm, Lord Trumpley? MI:13's investigations lead them to exclusive gentleman's establishment, The Tartarus Club, whose membership appears to be rapidly dwindling. What is the secret of the Tartarus Club? Why are the villagers of Thornton Gibbet afraid of a 300-year-old ghost? And why is it snowing in June? As everlasting winter sets in, Crow and Dunning find themselves pitted against their greatest foe yet, the King of Winter.	Simon Barnard & Paul Morris
10	30 June 2017	"The Gnomes of Death"	When MI:13's mortuary begins filling up with the disembodied feet of gardening enthusiasts, Harry Crow (David Warner) and Professor Dunning (Terry Molloy) are plunged into a sinister world of garden allotments, topiary fowl and gaudy garden ornaments. When the landlord of Harry's local, the Six Bells, is also found minus his snakeskin brothel creepers (and their contents), Crow and Dunning are plunged into a more sinister world still - of Morris dancers, exceptionally strong ale and all-powerful ancient Indian deities. What is the dark secret of the Six Bells privy? Are the Beer and Real Ale Association merely hirsute eccentrics, or something else? And what is the real purpose of Morris dancing? Crow and Dunning discover that horticulture can be a dangerous business, as they find themselves pitted against their shortest foes yet... the Gnomes of Death.	Simon Barnard & Paul Morris
