= Iron Foot Jack =

Australian-born British nightclub owner

Jack Neave in 1934

Jack Rudolph Neave or Neaves (c. 1886 – 1959), usually known as "Iron Foot Jack", was an Australian-born British nightclub owner who came to prominence in London during the notorious Caravan Club trial of 1934. Maurice Richardson described him as "a more agreeable kind of Alistair Crowley [sic] in a poorer way of business." He described himself as the "King of the Bohemians."

== Early life ==
According to Mark Benney, who attempted with difficulty to write Neave's biography (published 1939), Neave was born in the working class area of Woolloomooloo, Sydney, Australia, but was taken to England at a young age by his mother. His father was absent when their ship sailed from Marseille and his mother died about a year later. He apparently disagreed with his grandparents and ran away from a reformatory to travel with gypsies and later a travelling fair where he developed his skills as an escapologist and strongman.

About this time, Neave began to develop his persona as a mystic. He told fortunes and invented a new religion, the Children of the Sun.

At some point he had an accident which caused his right leg to be permanently shortened. To compensate he wore a metal device on his right boot which gave him the nickname "Iron Foot Jack" Neave gave various stories to Mark Benney about how it happened, including that he had been bitten by a shark while pearl diving, had been in an avalanche in Tibet, shot while smuggling and other tall tales.

== The Caravan Club ==
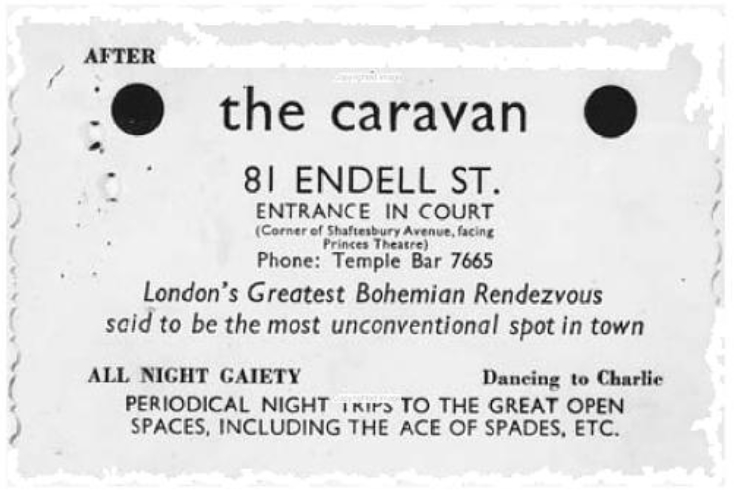
Advertising for the Caravan Club, 1934

By the early 1930s Neave was an experienced club promoter. He had already run the Jamset club and the Cosmopolitan club in Wardour Street and in 1934, with Billy Reynolds, opened the Caravan Club on 14 July in a basement in London's Endell Street. The club was gay and lesbian-friendly with low-level criminality and prostitution thrown in. Advertising promised "All night gaiety". It soon came under police surveillance and was raided in August. Neave, Reynolds, and many others were arrested. Neave and Reynolds were charged with running a disorderly house. At the time of the preliminary hearing on 28 August, Neave was described as a phrenologist, aged 48, and living at Robert Street, London NW.

Following a trial that concluded on 26 October 1934, Neave was convicted and sentenced to 20 months' hard labour. According to the Daily Express, as he went down to the cells to begin his sentence "the heavy clamp-clamp of his boot [on the stairs] could be heard".

== Description ==
Iron Foot Jack

The Express provided a detailed description of Neave: "He has black hair, which hangs over his shoulders. He wore a frock coat, large black stock tie, and a soft frilled shirt front. He is a man of tremendous strength." The paper characterised him as an:

outstanding figure among the lower strata of Bohemian London where he liked to regard himself as a sort of uncrowned king ... He regards himself as a man of deep knowledge, particularly in occult spheres. He was hailed as a sort of modern Socrates by his followers, who included artists, poets, painters and sculptors.

According to the Express, Neave was an associate of the model Dolores who had posed for Jacob Epstein, and he had organised a "farewell" night for her at one of his clubs shortly before her death (August 1934). The paper wrote that Neave wished to set up a new Bohemia in London "modelled on the lines of the Latin Quarter night resort".

== Soho ==
By the 1950s Neave was a well known Soho "character" as "Iron Foot Jack". He appeared in Pathé's 1955 newsreel Soho Goes Gay under that name. It is unclear if he was a vagrant by this time. He apparently survived by buying and selling beads door-to-door or by trying to sell poems on scraps of paper. Several sources speak of his poor personal hygiene, describing him as the man that put the BO in Bohemia, but that it improved somewhat after he married.

George Melly knew Neave in the late 1940s or early 1950s, and described him in his memoirs Owning Up but probably with some errors about the foot:

I came to know many a famous old Bohemian bore such as Iron Foot Jack, with his pocketful of yellowing press cuttings. Jack, dressed in a wide hat, cloak and knotted scarf and smelling like a goat in rut, claimed that his six-inch iron foot was the result of losing part of his leg to a passing shark, an unlikely explanation as he had retained the foot itself. He had a juicy cockney accent, boasted of occult powers, and lived with a series of old crones whom he used as an excuse for hinting at Crowleyan sexual virility. 'There are occult practices,' he told me every time we met, 'that it is best the general public know nuffink abaht. When I had my stewdyo in Museum Street...'

A recollection from a child in Pip Granger's collection Up West: Voices from the Streets of Post-War London speaks of Neave's frequent drunkenness and his tendency to drag his metal foot when inebriated causing sparks to fly.

One story often told about Neave, which may be apocryphal or exaggerated, is that he once ran a restaurant without a chef or any food. With the excuse of shortages and rationing, the only item on the menu available to be ordered was poisson et pommes frites (fish and chips). Should a diner be unlucky enough to enter and order that dish, Neave would send a boy to buy fish and chips from the local shop which he would serve nicely presented on a plate.

According to the recollections of Julian Davies, no one knew where Neave lived and it was unwise to give him your address in case you acquired an unwanted lodger. Davies met Neave at the 99 Club, 99 Charlotte Street in Fitzrovia (North Soho), where according to Davies, Neave "held his Court". Neave told Davies that if he sold one small piece of jewellery made from beads for sixpence, it gave him enough money to buy a loaf of bread and one more was enough to buy a pint of milk, which together was enough to live on for the day. He often went round with a young woman who he called his "Orniment".

In 1957 he would sit patiently as a character subject for Walter Merynowicz's evening classes in photo-portraiture at Ealing School of Art.

Around 1958 or 59, the musician Ian Dury, who was himself disabled after contracting polio, travelled to Old Compton Street in the hope of meeting "Iron Foot Jack", about whom he had heard. "I met him" he said "He was a real Bohemian: long white hair, cape, iron foot. I fell in love with the whole idea of being a Bohemian, before they said "beatnik"." Thus inspired by Neave, and already much attracted to French art, Dury began to call himself "Toulouse" after the disabled painter Toulouse Lautrec.

In 1959, Neave was featured in the Roundabout column of The Spectator explaining his view of why the bohemian had declined in London. He claimed to be aged 77. The same year, he appeared in the BBC's television programme Soho Story, quoting Omar Khayyam. One reviewer described him as "a Cockney philosopher, Professor Neame".

Neave was a frequenter of the cheap café rather than the public house, as you could stay for a long time in many cafés for the price of a cup of tea or coffee. According to Classic Cafes, his favourite haunt was French's in Old Compton Street, apparently a shop that sold French newspapers but really a no-frills coffee bar run by a Belgian. Shortly before his death, in 1959, Neave was captured on film again for the Rank Organisation's Coffee Bar short in their Look at Life series in which he appears in French's in a dirty black suit with a cape and a neckerchief fastened with a silver-colour clasp.

In 1956, Neave was painted by the young Tim Whidborne and in 1961 by Clifford Hall in a work titled Jack Neave at the Chat Noir Cafe. It was whilst having his portrait painted by Timothy Whidborne that he dictated his memoir The Surrender of Silence a copy of which he gave to the author Colin Wilson in 1957. Despite his efforts, Wilson was unable to find a publisher and the manuscript was found among Wilson's papers by his bibliographer Colin Stanley after the author's death in 2013. Stanley edited the text and it was published by Strange Attractor Press in 2018. The manuscript now lies in Wilson's archive at the University of Nottingham.

== Death ==
He died on September 29, 1959, at St Columba's Hospital in Hampstead, of cancer aged 77 or 79 years. He was buried at Hampstead Cemetery, Fortune Green Road, on October 7, 1959. Reported in the London Evening Standard 7 October 1959 and in the Daily Mail 8 October 1959.

== In fiction ==
Neave as "Iron Foot Jack" is one of the characters that Harry Preston meets in Colin Wilson's semi-autobiographical novel Adrift in Soho.

“Iron Foot Jack” makes several appearances in the film version of Colin Wilson’s Adrift in Soho directed by Pablo Behrens. “Iron Foot Jack” is played by Martin Calcroft in the film.

"Iron Foot" Jack Neave is one of the supporting characters in Alan Moore's The Great When.

== See also ==
- Soho Pam

"A Look At Life" series of newsreels has Jack appear in the Soho Coffee Bar episode as one of the characters of cafe society in Soho. (1959)
