= Hend al-Mansour =

Saudi-American visual artist and physician

Hend Al Mansour
- Born: 1956 (age 69–70); Hofuf, Saudi Arabia
- Education: Cairo University (MD); Minneapolis College of Art and Design (MFA)
- Spouse: David Penchansky

Hend Al Mansour (Arabic: هند المنصور, born 1956) is a Saudi-American visual artist and physician. Her printed silkscreens, installation art and portraits of Muslim women explore the religious and social belief systems of Arab communities. She earned degrees in cardiology and internal medicine, practicing medicine for 20 years. She immigrated to the United States in 1997 after receiving a fellowship at the Mayo Clinic in Minnesota. She then pursued an art career, attending the Women's Art Institute at St. Catherine University and earning her MFA from Minneapolis College of Art and Design where she was mentored by Aribert Munzner.

== Biography ==
Hend Al Mansour was born in Hofuf, Saudi Arabia in 1956. She obtained a degree of medicine from Cairo University in 1981. For 20 years, Al Mansour worked as a physician, as an Arab woman, a career that provided her "personal freedom and self-worth." She practiced medicine in Saudi Arabia at Hofuf and Riyadh until 1997 when she immigrated to the United States, having received a fellowship at the Mayo Clinic in Rochester, Minnesota. During her medical career, she obtained degrees in internal medicine and cardiology.

In 2000, she shifted careers from medicine to art, attending the Women's Art Institute at St. Catherine University. She was the program's teaching assistant the following year. While a student and participating in the institute, she began to answer the question, "Who's your audience?" She obtained a Master of Fine Arts from Minneapolis College of Art and Design (MCAD) in 2002. Al-Mansour is an installation artist, silkscreen printer, and a public speaker. Her work is about women in the Islamic world. She creates spaces representing the private lives of women out of silk-screened fabrics. She has shown in Minnesota and other states in the United States as well as in Saudi Arabia and United Arab Emirates. She is married to Dr. David Penchansky, a theology professor and writer, and they live in St. Paul, Minnesota.

== Themes, media and style ==
Al Mansour's work explores the religious and social belief systems of the Arab communities, especially those dealing with women, sexuality, and understanding the other. She uses Arabic calligraphy, images of Arab people, Islamic ornamentation and architecture. She investigates the status of contemporary Arab art and cultivates its independence from Western art and its distinction from other Middle Eastern and Islamic identities. She defines her audience as people from home, Saudi Arabia, and people in the Middle East because they can most easily identify with her work, and she is a part of them. As an American immigrant, she feels comfortable in the United States but explains that she typically needs to offer lengthy introductions to using religious and feminist ritualistic symbols to non-Saudi or Arab women and audiences.

Al Mansour often depicts portraits of Muslim women in architectural spaces using materials made out of silk-screened, dyed, or hennaed fabrics. Prominently in her pictorial images are stylized figures and faces intertwined with Islamic ornamentation composed using repeated, patterned forms. For example, a screen print from 2013 entitled Facebook 1 shows two women wearing dark blue chadors and seated on a patterned rug in an interior space. The woman in the foreground looks out at the viewer as she writes, with her right hand, words in Arabic on a large open book with white pages that dominate the background of the image. Behind the open book is a red-checkered, patterned field based on a scarf pattern typically worm by Saudi men. The woman in the background has her head down, which the artist has identified as a kind of self-portrait: "It symbolizes for me, that this woman has accepted what is going on, without resistance. It represents a side of me that might have accepted things in the past."

In her large-scale installations, Al-Mansour uses large sheets of silk, wool, canvas, or other fabric. Her installations resemble shrines, tents, or mosques in which the viewer walks in: they include archways, domes, sand, cushions, rugs, bowls or geometric sculptures, and distinctive Middle Eastern perfumes and scents that reflect aspects of her subjects' personalities and cultures.

In the 2014 exhibition titled How to Be a Feminist Artist, which took place at the Catherine G. Murphy Gallery at St. Catherine University, Al-Mansour's featured works examined the role of Muslim women in modern society. She included traditional Islamic elements like passages from the Quran and vivid Arabic textile patterns and designs to express gender disparity towards women.

== Selected exhibitions ==
- Radical Love: Female Lust (group show) 2017, at The Crypt Gallery
- The Great Mother of Islam 2014, at Cathering G Murphy gallery
- How to Be a Feminist Artist 2014, at Catherine G Murphy gallery
- Continuity and Change (group show) 2007, at
- Fatimah in America (solo show) 2007, at
- Arousat Al-Moulid (design and choreography) 2007, in collaboration with Jawaahir Dance Company
- Prizm of longing (group show) 2006, at The Phipps Center for the Arts
- Fatimah in America (3 women show) 2005, at the Sacred Art Festival in the University of St. Thomas
- Peac in the house (theater installation) 2004, commissioned by Voices of Sepharad
- The three faces of Mary (solo show) 2004, Wisdom Ways of the College of St. Catherine.
- Sheherazade Risking the Passage (Muslim women show) 2003, at Mira Gallery sponsored by WARM.
- Arab Eye (group show) 2002, at Babylon art Gallery.
- Heightened Awareness (2 women show) 2001, at Catherine G Murphy gallery
