= Aribert Munzner =

German-American painter (1930–2025)

Aribert "Ari" Munzner (January 9, 1930 – August 1, 2025) was a German-American artist. He was an abstract painter.

== Early life (1930–1955) ==
Munzner was born on January 9, 1930, in Mannheim, Baden, Germany, to Jewish parents. In 1937 his family fled Hitler's Germany to seek sanctuary with a family friend in Baghdad. They managed to procure visas to the US in 1939 because his father had been born in South Africa, and the quota for immigration from that country was not full, in contrast to Germany. They resettled first to New York City and then to Alton, New York.

He got a Bachelor of Fine Arts (BFA) at Syracuse University in 1953 and a Master of Fine Arts (MFA) at Cranbrook Academy of Art in 1955. The title of his MFA thesis was "Art Cannot be Taught".

== Career (1955–1994) ==
In 1955 Munzner became a professor at Minneapolis College of Art and Design (MCAD), where he continued to teach fulltime until 1993. He also served in many administrative roles in his years at MCAD, ranging from slide librarian in the 1950s to dean of faculty in the 1990s. In 1994, he became professor emeritus and retired from undergraduate teaching but continued to mentor graduate students. He fully retired from teaching in 2005, to devote his full time to painting. In 1988 he was awarded an Honorary MFA at that same institution.

He studied with photomicroscopist Roman Vishniac. He embarked on his decades-long Genesis project which involved creating vibrant bursts of color resembling galaxies on canvas, and also encompassing monochromatic drawings with minimal elements that resemble magnified images of cells. He mentored many other artists including Hend al-Mansour and Leah Golberstein.

Munzner was a visiting artist at the following institutions:

1995: Saint Cloud State University
1982: North Carolina School of the Arts
1979: Kansas City Art Institute
1976: University of Minnesota Duluth
1974: Yale School of Art
1972: University of New Orleans
1970: Nova Scotia College of Art and Design

== Later years ==
On May 29, 2020, during riots in Minneapolis sparked by the murder of George Floyd, the Hexagon Bar was engulfed in flames. The fire spread next door to The Ivy, a century-old building that housed the studio of Aribert Munzner along with many other artists. Due to water damage, many works from his 60-year career, including much of the Genesis Project, were damaged. Sizing up the catastrophic loss the ever optimistic Munzner said, "I’m starting again because that’s what I’ve been doing all my life," and then added, "Each moment is a magic moment".

== Personal life and death ==
Munzner died on August 1, 2025, at the age of 95. His daughter is computer scientist Tamara Munzner.

== Selected exhibitions ==
- 2016: Contemporary Iconographies (two-person exhibition), Vine Arts Center Gallery, Minneapolis, Minnesota
- 2005: Abstract Painting in Minnesota, Selected Works from 1930 to Present (invitational group), Rochester Art Center, Rochester, MN; Minnesota Museum of American Art, St. Paul Minnesota
- 2005: California Building Gallery, Minneapolis, Minnesota
- 2002: Retrospective, MUM University Gallery, Fairfield, Iowa
- 1999: Dolly Fiterman Fine Arts Gallery, Minneapolis, Minnesota (also 1998, 1984, 1982, 1978)
- 1993: FISEA-Fourth International Symposium on Electronic Art (invitational group), Minneapolis College of Art and Design
- 1988: CRASH: ComputeR-AssiSted Hardcopy (invitational group), Wright Museum of Art, Beloit, Wisconsin
- 1987: Simulations/Dissimulations (invitational group), The School of the Art Institute of Chicago
- 1987: Intermedia Arts Gallery, Minneapolis, Minnesota
- 1985: Electronic Visions II (invitational group), Contemporary Arts Center, New Orleans, Louisiana
- 1984: Allvision, with Woody/Steina Vasulka, Science Museum of Minnesota
- 1982: New Acquisitions Gallery, Syracuse, New York
- 1982: North Carolina School of the Arts, Winston-Salem, North Carolina (also 1978)
- 1979: Kansas City Art Institute, Foundation Division Gallery, Kansas City, Missouri
- 1977: St. Catherine College Gallery (two-person exhibition), St. Paul, Minnesota
- 1975: Retrospective, Tweed Museum of Art, Duluth, Minnesota
- 1971: Walker Art Center, Minneapolis, Minnesota
- 1969: Northrop Gallery, University of Minnesota, Minneapolis, Minnesota
- 1968: Gilman Gallery, Chicago, Illinois
- 1965: The Little Gallery, Minneapolis Institute of Arts, Minneapolis, Minnesota
- 1954: Contemporary Arts Gallery (group show), New York City, New York

== Books ==
- January 2000: Aribert Munzner: Teacher, Colleague, Artist, Minneapolis College of Art and Design Press, ISBN 096116722X
