= David Benson =

English theatre actor, writer and comedian (born 1962)

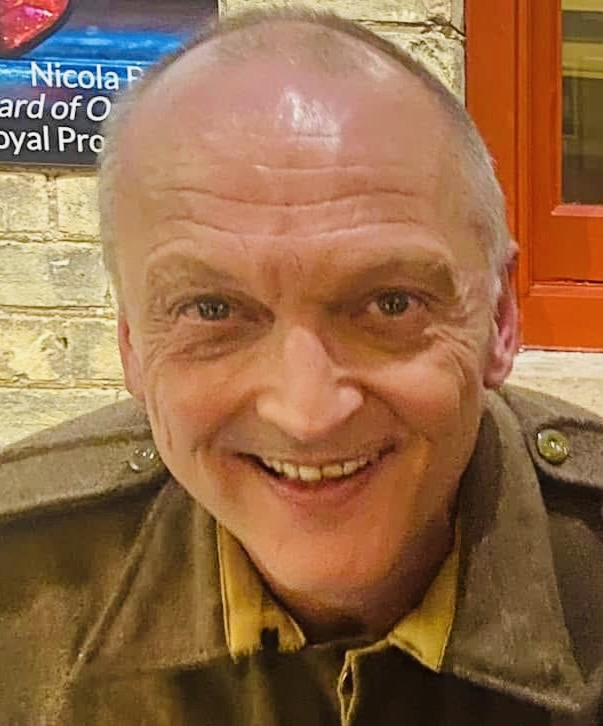
- David Benson in 2024
- Born: David Hodgson; 11 January 1962 (age 64); Oxford, England
- Education: Royal Holloway University
- Occupations: Actor; writer; director
- Notable work: Goodnight Sweetheart and Think No Evil of Us: My Life With Kenneth Williams
- Website: www.davidbenson.webs.com

David Benson (born David Hodgson; 11 January 1962) is an English theatre actor, writer and comedian.

He was born in Oxford, England, and has a twin sister, Miranda, and an older brother, Jonathan. Educated at Park Hall Secondary Modern in Castle Bromwich, Warwickshire, and at Sutton Coldfield College of Further Education, he went on to gain a Degree in Drama and Theatre Studies at the Royal Holloway College, University of London. From 1985 he lived in Edinburgh, but moved to New York in 1993, where he spent much of the following four years. He changed his surname in 1996 on joining Equity, the actors' trade union. In 2001 he moved permanently to London, where he currently resides.

Primarily a stage performer, he initially became known for his one-man stage show, entitled Think No Evil of Us: My Life with Kenneth Williams, about the life and career of the actor, for which he won the Scotsman's Fringe First award in 1996; and for his television role as Noël Coward in the 1990s BBC comedy series Goodnight Sweetheart. His theatrical repertoire includes many of Coward's songs, performed in-character as Coward. When not touring in the theatre he worked on BBC radio, including playing the character parts in the science fiction comedy series The Scarifyers.

He has a dozen one-man shows in his theatrical repertoire, with which he tours. He also sings: performing a wide range of the songs of Coward, amongst others, in a flamboyant cabaret style, performed in-character. He has also written and directed professional stage productions for other performers.

His theatrical, television and radio work has mainly revolved around comedy. His most famous roles, impersonating comic actor Kenneth Williams, comedian Frankie Howerd, and Coward, have all used his talent for mimicking well-known stars of stage and screen.

== Television ==
In 1975, at the age of 13, Benson wrote a story called "The Rag-and-Bone Man" for a contest on the BBC1 children's series Jackanory. His entry won, and was performed by Kenneth Williams on the show. It was this initial writing credit, which only by chance was performed by Williams (Benson had written the piece with Spike Milligan in mind), that later influenced him when he was trying to decide on a subject for his first one-man show at the Edinburgh Fringe.

In 1998 and 1999 Benson played Noël Coward in the BBC television series Goodnight Sweetheart for its final two series . He also lent his voice to the 1998 Reputations documentary on the life and career of Kenneth Williams, reading excerpts from Williams's published diaries. Both engagements came about due to the fame of his one-man show, in which he had performed in-character impressions of Williams and Coward.

== Stage ==
After leaving college, Benson moved to Edinburgh where he had various jobs, including working as a "skivvy" in a restaurant kitchen and as an assistant in Scotland's first gay and lesbian bookshop.

Between 1990 and 1996 he worked in the Edinburgh-based Grassmarket Project Theatre Company, performing in a series of award-winning semi-documentary dramas, often improvised, ranging from homeless men (Glad, 1990–92) to pensioners (One Moment, 1993), and a young lady whose brother was killed in police custody (20/52, 1995). These productions gave him his first taste of theatrical success, when One Moment, an improvised drama devised by Jeremy Weller, won a Fringe First award at the Edinburgh Festival in 1993.

It was at the Edinburgh Fringe, in 1996, that he premiered his first one-man show, Think No Evil of Us: My Life With Kenneth Williams, a semi-autobiographical production based around the life and career of English comedy actor Kenneth Williams, performed mainly in character as Williams; and which, as with his subsequent Edinburgh shows (with the exception of Star Struck) was entirely written by himself. The show was an immediate hit with audiences, winning a Scotsman Fringe First award.

In 1997 the production began a national tour of the UK, culminating in a three-week West End run at the Vaudeville Theatre during 1998. He revived it in 2001 and continued to tour it for the following ten years: he once claimed he would continue touring the show "'till I drop".

In 1998 he premiered his second one-man show, at the Assembly Rooms, during the Edinburgh Fringe. Titled Nothing But Pleasure, it was timed to coincide with the first anniversary of the death of Diana, Princess of Wales, and consisted mainly of a detailed description of the events at her funeral. Nothing But Pleasure was subsequently invited to the Sydney Festival, where Benson and pianist/arranger David Paul Jones performed it in The Playhouse at the Sydney Opera House in January 1999. The show then ran at the Jermyn Street Theatre London during 2000, under the revised title Mourning Glory.

After a brief interlude of theatrical inactivity, he returned to the Fringe and to touring in 2001, writing and performing a sequel to Think No Evil Of Us, and in the process breaking a vow he had made in 1998 never to play another dead, camp comic ("As if I intended to spend the rest of my life impersonating dead, camp comedians!"), turning his attention to the late Frankie Howerd. To Be Frank played The Pleasance, Edinburgh at the 2001 Festival. As well as being an examination of the life and career of Howerd, the show, like all of Benson's work, had a strong autobiographical element: he gave an uncompromising account of his "period of theatrical inactivity" in a sequence which culminated in the uproarious "slaughter" of a collection of "irritating television personalities". The production is one he was still touring with in 2011, subtitled Frankie Howerd and the Secret of Happiness (an ironic comment on the fact that Frankie never seemed to find that secret).

In January 2002 Benson appeared, for the first time, in a play. He stepped into the breach to take a role in the Peepolykus production of Eugène Ionesco's absurdist classic Rhinoceros, which toured the UK for the first half of the year, before returning for a season at the Lyric Hammersmith and Battersea Arts Centre. During the long drives to and from these shows, Benson and Peepolykus founder David Sant discussed the possibility of working on a new show together. The result, in 2003, was Star Struck, his fourth one-man show, in which he appeared in character as, amongst other stars, Fred Astaire, Frank Sinatra, Noël Coward and even Judy Garland – which he premiered, once again, at that year's Edinburgh Fringe.

During 2003 he also appeared in a production of Joe Orton's Loot directed by Cal McCrystal, at the Derby Playhouse, in which he took the role Kenneth Williams had played in the original 1966 West End production.

Benson has directed for the stage. In 2003 he directed (and co-created) All the Rage, the first solo stage show by the media personality Janet Street-Porter, which premiered at that year's Edinburgh Fringe. In pantomime he starred in Jack and the Beanstalk at the Newbury Corn Exchange, once again directed by Cal McCrystal, during Christmas 2004. He subsequently wrote two pantomimes, Cinderella and Dick Whittington, both of which were directed by McCrystal at Newbury.

Between 2005 and 2007 he developed and wrote three further one-man shows, premiering each in turn at the Edinburgh Festival Fringe. These were, respectively, David Benson's Haunted Stage; It's A Plot: David Benson's Conspiracy Cabaret; and Why Pay More. He continued touring in his earlier shows, as well as making Christmas appearances in pantomime. In 2006 his appearance at the Fringe also included the 10th anniversary production of Think No Evil Of Us: My Life with Kenneth Williams. Additionally in 2006, during a busy year he appeared in a play at the Theatre Royal Winchester, directed by James Barry, starring in the comedy Same Time, Next Year, in which he took the Alan Alda role from the film.

In August 2008 he again premiered a one-man show at the Fringe, turning his attention to Noël Coward once more, with David Benson Sings Noel Coward. This show originated as a cameo impression of Coward in Benson's original 1996 stage production of Think No Evil Of Us: My Life with Kenneth Williams, a cameo which led to his being offered a continuing role as Noël Coward in the BBC television series Goodnight Sweetheart. This in turn led to his performing a number of Coward's monologues and songs on stage, as part of the "Hollywood Party" sequence in his one-man show Star Struck which premiered at the Fringe in 2003, built around the Coward monologue Mad Dogs and Englishmen.

He continued to direct. At the 2008 Fringe he directed – as well as writing – the First World War drama My Grandfather's Great War, starring Cameron Stewart, based upon the experiences of Stewart's grandfather in the 1914–18 War as recorded in his war diaries. After premiering it at the Fringe, the production toured in spring 2009 and enjoyed a London run in November 2010.

In his on-line blog Benson talked about his role in the London production of the revival of the black comedy Future Me by Stephen Brown, originally produced in 2007, in which he toured during February and March 2009, which then played London's Only Connect until 26 April. As usual, he appeared throughout August at the Edinburgh Fringe in a new one-man show written by himself: in 2009 he was premiering Dr Whom? My Search for Samuel Johnson, giving a definitive account of the life of Dr Johnson, the man who, in the 18th century, wrote the world's first dictionary of the English language.

During 2009 he also appeared in a play, with author Clayton Littlewood and singer Alexis Gerred, portraying a number of character roles in an adaptation of Littlewood's best-selling book Dirty White Boy (a book which became a favourite of Elton John), about the crazy Soho characters, all played by Benson, who the author came to know during his time running a clothes shop in London's Old Compton Street. Having done initial performances in July 2009, Benson returned in a longer version of the play for a month's run in 2010, appearing at London's Trafalgar Studios until 26 May.

He appeared at the Edinburgh Festival Fringe during August 2010 premiering two new productions, previewed in Eastbourne, in Highgate, London and in Oxford during July.

The first of these, presented at the Gilded Balloon, continued his singing career. In a show entitled The Singalong Glee Club, he picked up where his Noël Coward song spiel had left off, with a musical evening featuring well-known songs from his 20th Century songbook: but, on this occasion, not exclusively by Coward. His repertoire included "Cohen Owes Me Ninety-Seven Dollars" (Irving Berlin, 1915), "All the Things You Are" (Kern/Hammerstein, 1939), and "Collegiate" (Jaffe/Bonx, 1925). His pianist was once again Stewart Nicholls.

The other show which he premiered at the 2010 Fringe was a drama, written by himself, titled Lockerbie – Unfinished Business, telling the story of Dr Jim Swire, whose daughter Flora was killed in the bombing of Pan Am Flight 103. This production which garnered him international notices, including in the New York Times and as far afield as Hollywood, as well as winning him a Scotsman Fringe First award, and for which he was nominated for an Amnesty International Freedom of Expression award.

He ultimately had a dozen one-man shows in his theatrical repertoire, with which he was regularly touring, including Think No Evil Of Us: My Life With Kenneth Williams; Nothing But Pleasure (a.k.a. Mourning Glory); To Be Frank: Frankie Howerd and the Secret of Happiness; Star Struck: A Fantasy Celebrity Party; David Benson's Haunted Stage; It's A Plot: David Benson's Conspiracy Cabaret; Why Pay More; David Benson's Christmas Party; Doctor Whom: My Search for Samuel Johnson; David Benson sings Noel Coward; and the two productions which he premiered at Edinburgh in 2010, The Singalong Glee Club and Lockerbie: Unfinished Business.

For Easter 2011 he did a London season at the Warehouse, Croydon from 6 to 17 April, presenting Lockerbie: Unfinished Business and his two most enduring shows: Think No Evil of Us – My Life With Kenneth Williams and To Be Frank – Frankie Howerd and the Secret of Happiness.

In 2011 he also appeared in the National Theatre production of Richard Bean's comedy One Man, Two Guvnors, starring television actor James Corden, adapted from Goldoni's Servant of Two Masters, which was presented at the Lyttelton Theatre on London's South Bank for a ten-week season from 17 May to 26 July, directed by Nicholas Hytner with Cal McCrystal. Benson had previously worked with McCrystal in Loot (Derby Playhouse, 2003) and Jack and The Beanstalk (Newbury Corn Exchange, Christmas 2004), both productions which McCrystal directed; and, in addition, Benson wrote two pantomimes (Cinderella and Dick Whittington) which were directed by McCrystal at Newbury.

In One Man, Two Guvnors he played the waiter, Gareth, whilst also understudying two of the main parts, including the lead, Charlie. He ultimately appeared in over 1,000 performances at the NT and in the West End. The production toured the UK throughout September and October, including Cardiff and Edinburgh.

Subsequently he starred as Boris Johnson, at a point when Johnson was still London Mayor, in a new one-man show presented at the 2015 and 2016 Edinburgh Fringe festivals, a satire entitled Boris: World King.

From 2017 to 2020 he co-starred with actor Jack Lane in a two-hander stage comedy, entitled Dad's Army Radio Show, in which the two performers played 25 characters between them. They adapted a total of nine classic Dad's Army scripts, based on popular episodes from the BBC-tv show written by Jimmy Perry and David Croft, to mark the 50th Anniversary of the show, which began in 1968. After premiering at the Edinburgh Festival Fringe in 2017 the production went on to play over 250 performances on many nationwide tours. To the relief of Benson and Lane the show was very much enjoyed by Michael Knowles and Harold Snoad who originally adapted the scripts for radio. The 2020 tour was interrupted by the COVID-19 pandemic, the last performance before the nationwide lockdown was at the West Cliff Theatre at Clacton-on-Sea.

Edinburgh Fringe 2019 – Benson returned to the one-man show format with a new show called Cato Street 1820. After four years research and study of the Cato Street conspiracy and discovery of forgotten music in the British Library, the new production is detailed on its own website: http://www.catostreet1820.co.uk

In December 2019 Benson again starred alongside Jack Lane in a two man show of A Christmas Carol by Charles Dickens at The Capitol Theatre, Horsham. Benson played the character of Ebenezer Scrooge while his co-star played the rest. The show was a success and went ahead again at the Theatre for December 2020, except the show ended early due to new COVID-19 restrictions in the area.

In April 2022 Benson joined the cast of the popular Jukebox musical by Laurence Marks and Maurice Gran, Dreamboats and Petticoats for its UK tour. During the production Benson played a number of roles including a cameo as Kenneth Williams, one theatre critic wrote “perhaps the stand out 5 minutes of the whole show is David Benson, when he cameos as a very convincing Kenneth Williams presenting Eurovision. His rendition of William’s famous musical sketch Ma crepe suzette has the audience in stitches and his performance really adds to the show’s quintessential old school British variety show humour, reminiscent of Saturday Night at the London Palladium. A true talent!”

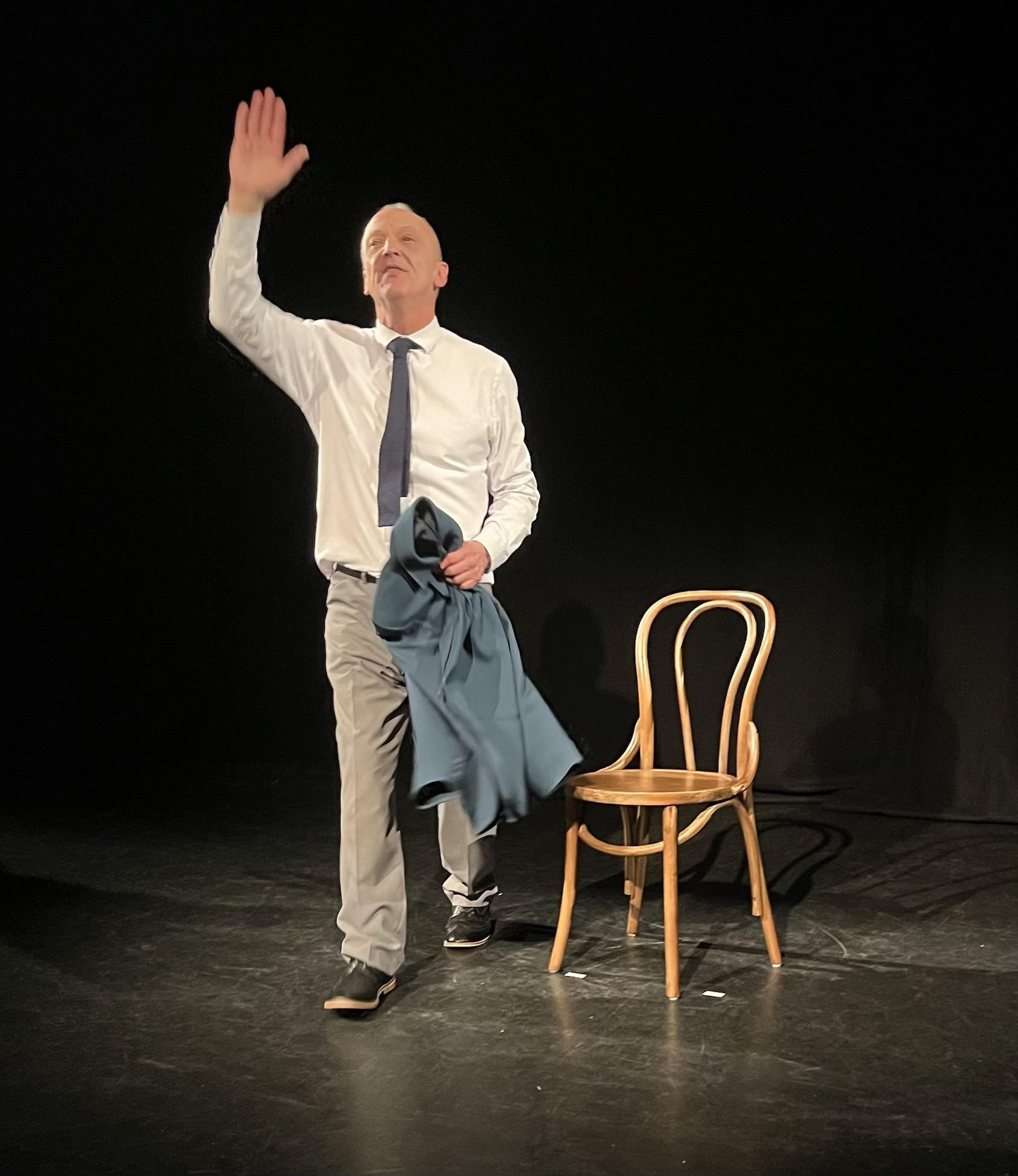
Benson performing in My Life With Kenneth Williams in 2026

In 2026 Benson toured in an updated version of My Life With Kenneth Williams with Act 1 dedicated to Benson as a 13 year old writing the story for Jackanory that was performed by Kenneth Williams. The production commemorates the centenary of Williams' birth.

== Radio ==
David Benson has been interviewed on many BBC and ILR radio shows, including Mavis Nicholson (in December 1996), Michael Parkinson’s Sunday Supplement, Ned Sherrin's Loose Ends (in February 2003 and again in December 2007), Kaleidoscope, and Midweek.

In December 2002 he appeared in Ruth Draper and Her Company of Characters on BBC Radio 4, which was an appreciation of the life and career of an actress whom he cites as one of the most important influences on his stage work, for her ability to portray many distinct characters without the benefit of electronic special effects or a supporting cast.

Benson has an unusual facility with accents and as a mimic and impressionist. In November 2003 he performed The Private World of Kenneth Williams, a three-part series for BBC Radio 4, in which he read extracts from The Kenneth Williams Diaries in character as Williams. Subsequently he appeared in-character as Williams in Horne of Plenty, a 3-hour special for BBC radio, broadcast on Radio 7 in December 2005 (repeated in 2008 and 2011), celebrating the radio shows of Kenneth Horne, in all of which Williams had appeared. In February 2006 he narrated the documentary Carry On Filming for BBC Radio 4, a retrospective of the Carry On films, in which Williams had appeared more often than any other member of the team.

All of his radio work connected with Kenneth Williams was commissioned by BBC producer Jonathan James Moore, who died in November 2005, aged 59, without whose support this type of work has dried up.

More recently, his facility with accents and as a voice artist have led him into character parts in radio drama. In the first of these, in July 2006, he narrated the BBC Radio 1 documentary Waiting for Superman, a history of the DC Comics character, which he performed in an authentic American accent.

He then played various character roles in a selection of independent drama productions broadcast on BBC Radio 7 and BBC Radio 4 Extra: firstly in a four-part Paul McGann Doctor Who radio serial titled Invaders from Mars, set in 1938 (broadcast at Halloween 2005), in which (amongst other parts) he made use of his facility for impersonating famous Hollywood stars by playing Orson Welles; and subsequently in seven science fiction radio productions in The Scarifyers series, made by the independent producer Cosmic Hobo, where he was playing comedy parts in character alongside former Doctor Who actors Nicholas Courtney (Brigadier Lethbridge-Stewart) and Terry Molloy (Davros), in the spoofs The Nazad Conspiracy and The Devil of Denge Marsh (both were three part serials broadcast during 2007, and repeated in 2009, 2010 and 2012), For King and Country (a four-part serial broadcast in February 2009, repeated in 2010, 2011 and 2012), The Curse of the Black Comet (a four-part serial broadcast in October 2010, repeated in May 2011, which also featured Brian Blessed), and The Secret Weapon of Doom (with Leslie Phillips) (a four-part serial broadcast in January 2012, repeated in January 2013).

Despite the death in 2011 of co-star Nicholas Courtney, 'The Scarifyers' series has continued. David Warner and Philip Madoc have recorded further serials alongside Terry Molloy, in which Benson once again played the character parts. The first of these, The Magic Circle, was broadcast on BBC Radio 4 Extra in January and February 2012 (and repeated in February 2013). The next, The Horror of Loch Ness, aired in 2014.

He played the recurring role of Panda in the Iris Wildthyme series, a collection of humorous audio dramas made by Big Finish Productions, released exclusively on CD. These starred another former Doctor Who companion, Katy Manning (Jo Grant), as Miss Wildthyme.

In December 2007 he appeared in another character role for radio, in a Saturday Play broadcast on BBC Radio 4, written by Pamela Branch. This was a comedy set in 1951, entitled The Wooden Overcoat, in which he was cast as an extremely camp character (even more so than his role as Aleister Crowley in the Scarifyers serials), a characterisation which he based in part on the character known as 'Snide' created by Kenneth Williams on radio in Hancock's Half Hour and in the film Carry On Spying.

These comedy productions involved him in character parts, portraying not only American accents but also sundry East European and Russian accents when cast as various mad scientists in the Dr Frankenstein mould. The Scarifyers serials also cast him in one highly camp role, as psychic investigator Aleister Crowley: a part with strongly emphasised similarities to his high-camp comedic style on stage, when portraying Kenneth Williams and Frankie Howerd in his one-man show. In the various Scarifyers comedies, he has typically played half a dozen character roles in each, filling up the cast by supplying those parts not played by stars Nicholas Courtney and Terry Molloy, including – amidst sundry sinister East Europeans – lampooning a varied collection of eccentric upper class Englishmen.

His performance as Frankie Howerd in Martyn Hesford's BBC Radio 4 drama Frankie Takes A Trip gained him a Best Actor nomination in the BBC Audio Drama Awards.

Comedy has been the recurring theme in his career, which began with his stage act impersonating two famous camp comedians, Kenneth Williams and Frankie Howerd, then progressed to his role in the television situation comedy Goodnight Sweetheart camping it up as Noël Coward, and came full circle with his radio work, playing comedy roles that owe much to the high-camp style popularised by Kenneth Williams. He cites the radio shows of Jack Benny and Spike Milligan as his earliest comedy influences.

== Film ==
He played a Liberace hologram in the feature film Blade Runner 2049. This was another engagement, as with his 1990s television work, which he obtained as a result of his one-man stage show, Think No Evil of Us – My Life with Kenneth Williams: Liberace being one of the American stars of whom he did impressions in the Hollywood Party sequence.
