= Rupert Shrive =

English artist

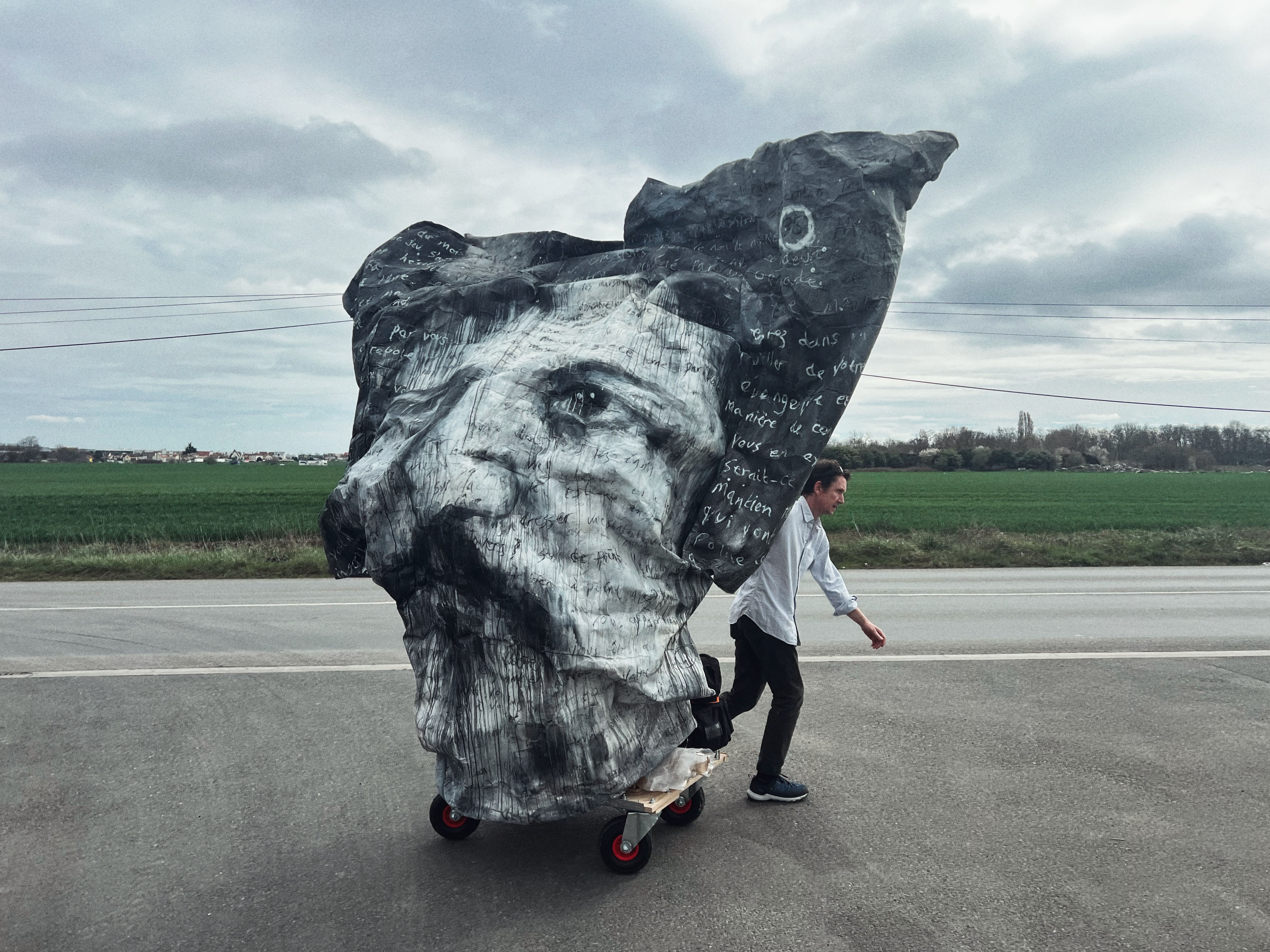
Rupert Shrive performance, 2023, pushing by foot his 3.5 metre sculpture of Balzac, 300 km, from the Maison de Balzac, Paris to the Musée Balzac, Chateau de Saché, outside Tours.

Rupert Shrive (born 1965) is an English artist who was born in West Runton.

His interest in art started at the age of six, copying Uccello's Saint George and the Dragon. He attended Norwich School of Art, St Martin's School of Art and the Slade School of Fine Art in London. He had a studio above the Coach and Horses in Soho for five years, where he met Francis Bacon. Among his subjects was Soho Pam, a homeless beggar who peddled copies of his watercolour portrait of her.

He lived for many years in Spain and Italy before settling in Paris. His work has been exposed at the Courtauld Institute in London and the Maison de Balzac in Paris. The film, I Love Paris, based on a poem by Rufo Quintavalle, was shot on location in and around his Montmartre atelier in 2024.

== Selected solo exhibitions ==
2022 Rupert Shrive expose La Peau de chagrin, Maison de Balzac, Paris
