= Endell Street =

Street in London, England

Coordinates: 51.51442°N 0.12441°W

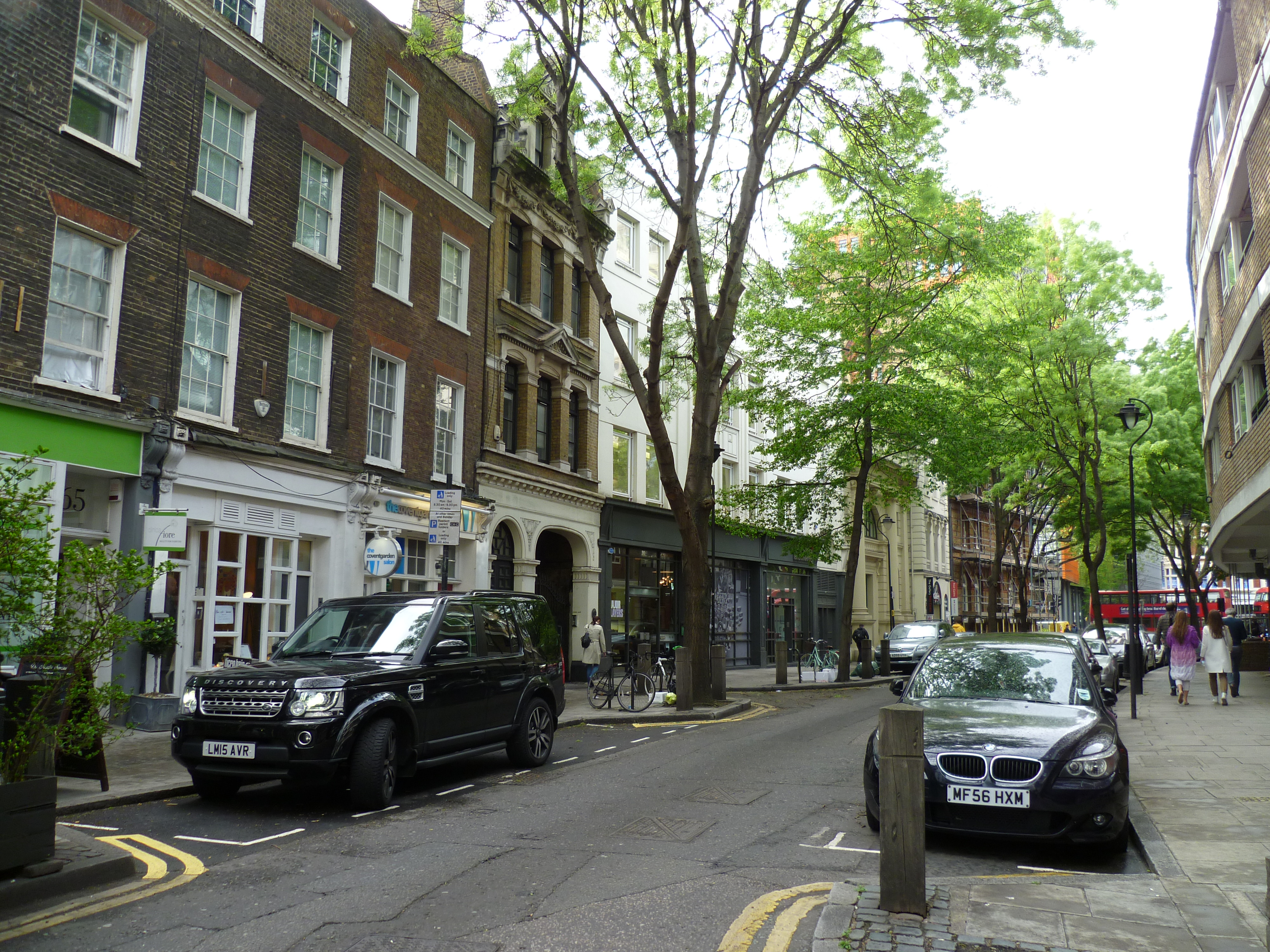
Endell Street looking towards Holborn

Endell Street, originally known as Belton Street, is a street in London's West End that runs from High Holborn in the north to Long Acre and Bow Street, Covent Garden, in the south. A long tall narrow building on the west side is an 1840s-built public house, the Cross Keys, Covent Garden.

== Location ==
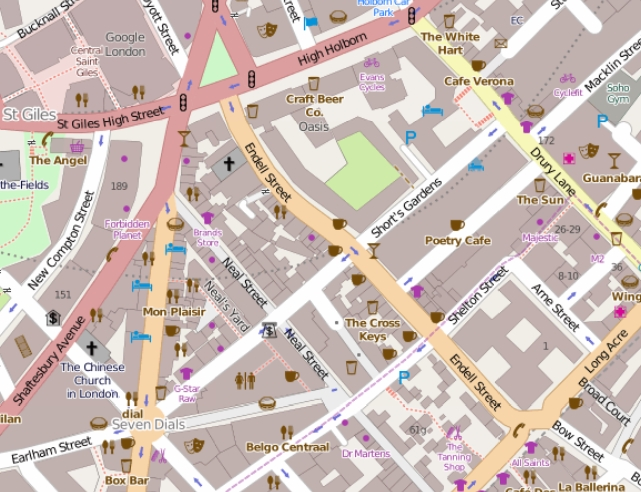
The immediate vicinity of Endell Street

Endell Street is crossed only by Shorts Gardens and Shelton Street. Betterton Street intersects between these on the eastern side. The northern end of the street is in the London Borough of Camden, the south in the City of Westminster. The street is an avenue with very tall, mature plane trees, widely spaced; it now equals the B401 (which had included Bow and Wellington Streets) and is one-way, southbound.

== History ==
The land on which the southern part of Endell Street is built was originally owned by William Short, who leased it to Esmé Stewart, 3rd Duke of Lennox, in 1623–24. Lennox House was built on the site which eventually passed to Sir John Brownlow who began to build from 1682. Belton Street was created, named after the Brownlow's country seat in Lincolnshire, Belton House. Henry Wheatley writes that the southern end of the street from Castle Street to Short's Gardens was originally known as Old Belton Street, the northern end from Short's Gardens to St Giles, was known as New Belton Street.

In the seventeenth century, Queen Anne is supposed to have bathed in the waters from a medical spring there at a site known as Queen Anne's Bath.

The modern Endell Street was created according to the reforming plans of architect James Pennethorne.

Charles Lethbridge Kingsford states that the street was built in 1846 when Belton Street was widened and extended northwards to Broad Street (now in High Holborn). The street is believed to have been named after the Reverend James Endell Tyler, rector of St Giles in the Fields in the 1840s. The British Lying-In Hospital was relocated to a purpose-built building on Endell Street in 1849.

== Listed buildings ==
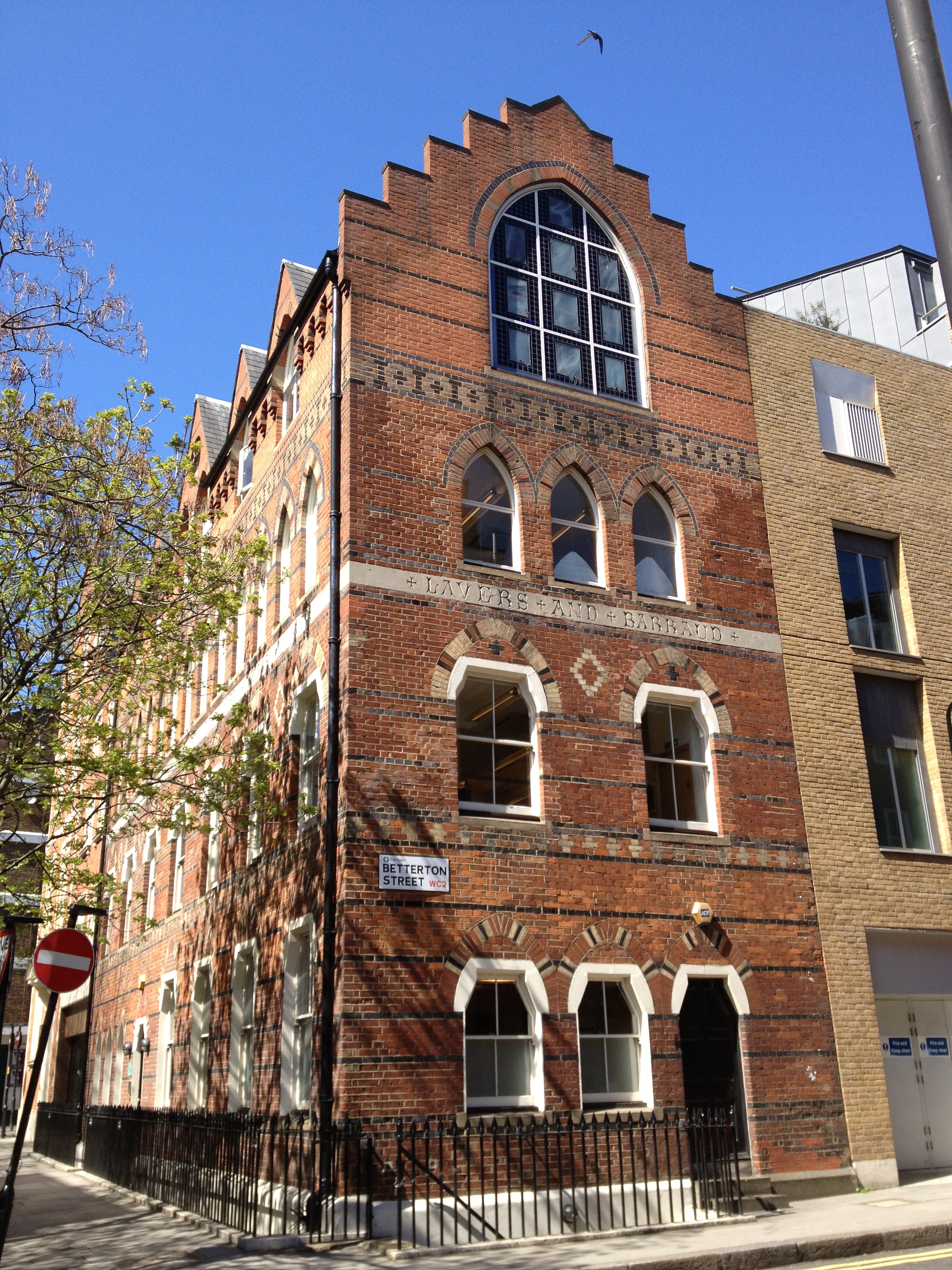
Former Lavers & Barraud studios, with modern Brian Clarke stained-glass window

There are eight listed buildings of the street, including:

=== Lavers and Barraud stained-glass studio ===
The Jewell and Withers Building at 22 Endell Street is a Grade II listed building. Located on the corner of Betterton Street and Endell Street, the polychromatic brick-and-stone Gothic Revival structure, cited as an early example of the style, was designed as a studio for the stained-glass firm Lavers and Barraud in 1859, and is included, together with the attached cast-iron railings, on the National Heritage register. The crow-step gable, facing Betterton Street, has a significant contemporary artwork by painter Brian Clarke, in the form of a three-light stained-glass window. The Post-modern artwork, which references the building's original function as a stained-glass studio, was commissioned as part of the 1981 refurbishment of the building, undertaken by architects Rock Townsend. The artwork was part-funded by the British Crafts Council, and fabricated in Germany under Clarke's supervision. It was installed in 1981, and was notably designed to be equally visually effective both by night and by day, making graphic use of complex leading, and deploying different types of mouth-blown glass to particular effect.

=== Cross Keys public house ===
The Cross Keys public house at No.31, constructed in 1848–49, is a Grade II listed building.

=== Latchfords Timber Yard ===
The nineteenth-century Latchfords Timber Yard and attached timber sheds at No.61 are Grade II listed.

=== Swiss Protestant Church ===
The Swiss Protestant Church at No.79 was designed by George Vulliamy and built 1853–4. It is also Grade II listed.

== Inhabitants ==
The watercolour painter William Henry Hunt was born at "8 Old Belton Street" (No. 7) in 1790.

== Hospitals of Endell Street ==
=== British Lying-in Hospital ===
Founded in 1749, this maternity hospital was built at No.24 in 1849; it closed in 1913.

=== St Paul's Hospital ===
Founded in 1898, this urology hospital took over the premises at No.24 after the British Lying-In Hospital closed; St Paul's Hospital closed in 1992.

=== Endell Street Military Hospital ===
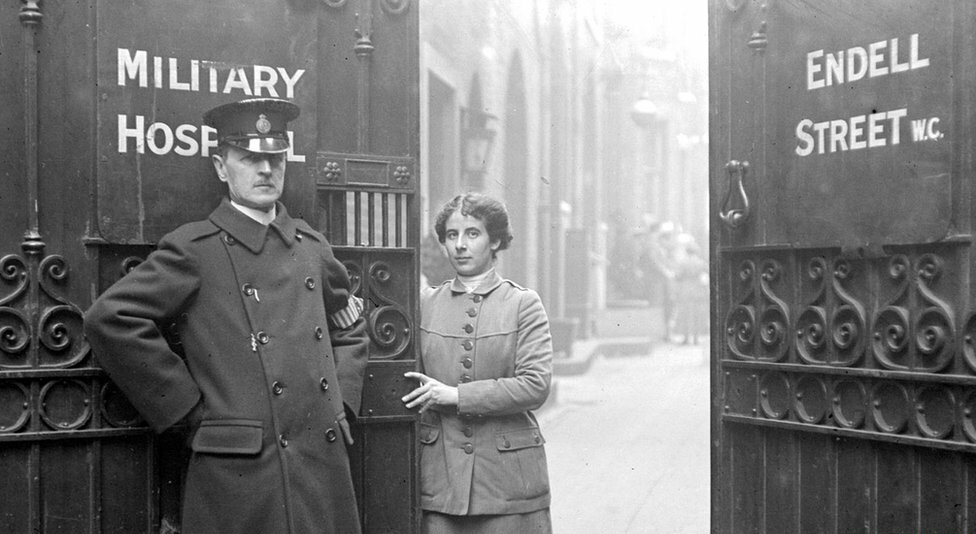
Endell Street Military Hospital, c. 1915

During the first world war a military hospital operated from No.36, staffed entirely by women. The hospital was opened in 1915 by suffragists Dr Flora Murray and Dr Louisa Garrett Anderson and treated 24,000 patients and carried out more than 7,000 operations. It closed in 1919.

== Clubs ==
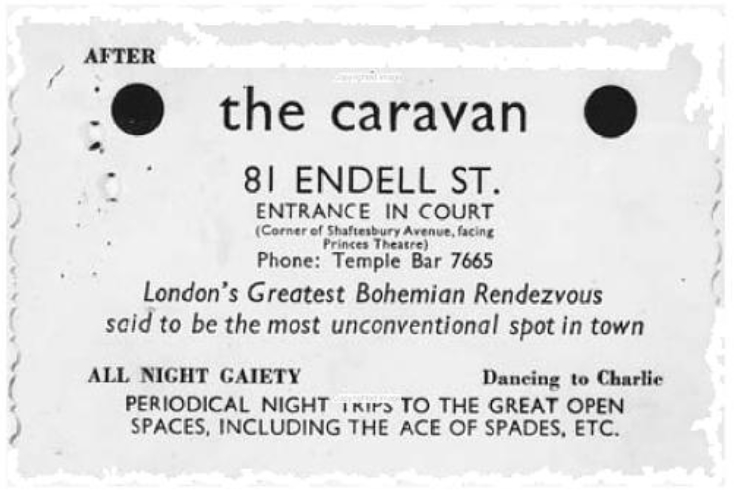
Advertising for the Caravan Club, 1934

=== The Caravan Club ===
The basement of No.81 was home from July 1934 to the Caravan Club, which advertised itself as "London's Greatest Bohemian Rendezvous said to be the most unconventional spot in town", code for being gay-friendly. The club helpfully promised "All night gaiety". It was run by Jack Rudolph Neaves, known as Iron Foot Jack on account of the metal leg brace he wore, and was frequented by both gay men and lesbian women. It was financed by small-time criminal Billy Reynolds.

The club came to the attention of the police almost straight away and in August local residents complained "It's absolutely a sink of iniquity." The club was raided on 25 August, with men arrested. Their trial at Bow Street Magistrates' Court caused a sensation reported in the News of the World.

In July 2024, a property developer proposed that a rainbow plaque be added to the Endell Street site, now known as The Sail Loft.

=== The Hospital Club ===
The Hospital Club opened in 2003 at No.24 to serve the members of London's media and creative industries. It was on the site of the former St Paul's Hospital. It was used by the rock band Radiohead to record parts of their 2007 album In Rainbows and the 2008 live video In Rainbows – From the Basement. In 2020, the club closed permanently owing to the effects of the COVID-19 pandemic and other "extenuating circumstances".
