= Leah Golberstein =

American artist

Leah Golberstein is a paper, fiber, and installation artist residing in Minneapolis, Minnesota. She was a faculty member at the Minneapolis College of Art and Design for 10 years and was a founder of the Form + Content Gallery.

Work by Golberstein is in the collection of the Walker Art Center, and the Minneapolis Institute of Art.

Golberstein identifies as Jewish, has studied Talmud and Jewish history, and much of her work draws upon her Jewish roots. She has been a participant in group exhibits on both Jewish and interfaith themes (Interpretations of Faith, Basilica of St. Mary, 2009; Uncommon Visions: Jewish Textile Artists, Tychman Shapiro Gallery, 2011; Jewish Artists' Laboratory Project, Sabes Jewish Community Center, 2013–2014), as well as having developed her own exhibits on themes of faith and interaction of faiths (Uprooted Lights, Form + Content Gallery, 2007).

In an installation she calls "Uprooted Lights," elements of traditional Judaism are used in the form of a tallit or prayer shawl and tzitzits, or little twiglike bundles used in rituals. Golberstein cherishes the time consuming process by which she hand-makes paper from flax, experiencing it by thinking of it as meditative labor.
