= David Penchansky =

American biblical scholar (born 1951)

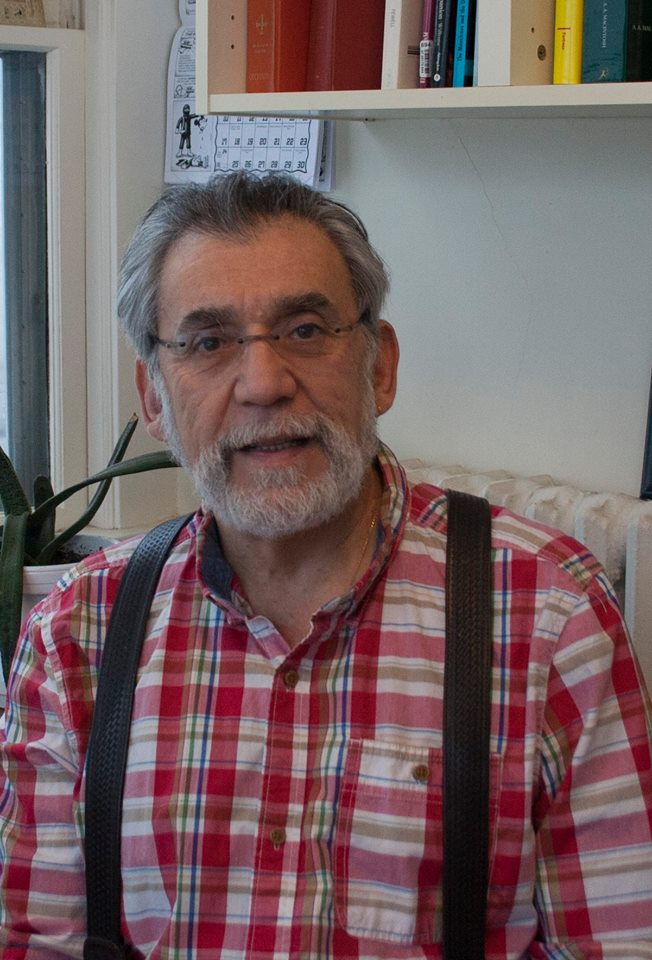
- Born: December 3, 1951 (age 74); Brooklyn, New York
- Years active: 1980–present
- Spouse: Hend Al-Mansour

David Penchansky is a professor of theology, focusing on studies of the Hebrew Bible. He is currently a full professor at the University of St. Thomas in St. Paul, Minnesota. In his writing, he applies the methodology of literary criticism to the Old Testament, particularly its Wisdom Literature (the books of Job, Proverbs, Ecclesiastes, Ben Sira (book of Sirach, or Ecclesiasticus) and the Wisdom of Solomon). He has been a contributor to the Oxford Encyclopedia of the Bible and Theology, and authored several non-fiction books.

== Early life ==
David Penchansky was born in Brooklyn, New York on December 3, 1951, the son of Charles and Mimi (Black) Penchansky.

He earned a B.A. at Queens College, City University of New York in 1974, an MA in biblical languages from the Assemblies of God Theological Seminary in 1980 in and a PhD from Vanderbilt University Graduate School in Hebrew Bible in 1988. His dissertation was Dissonance in Job:The Weight of Literary and Theological Conflict.

== Career ==
In 1980, Penchansky joined the Evangel College as an instructor, where he taught until 1984. In 1985, he joined the Western Kentucky University as an adjunct professor, where he taught for the next four years. In 1989, he joined the Theology Department of the University of St. Thomas.

Penchansky wrote his first book entitled What Rough Beast in 1990. In it, he claimed blasphemy as an appropriate response to human suffering, using the book of Job and the Holocaust as a models. Critics suggested that Penchansky’s approach ignored the larger context of biblical passages, portraying the Bible as a mass of conflicting theological positions. His subsequent publications have considered the negative sides of God, and the polytheistic underpinnings of ancient Israelite religion. His book Twilight of the Gods: Polytheism in the Hebrew Bible claims to show how certain biblical texts portray a complex interplay of monotheistic and polytheistic ideas. In a review of the book, the Journal of Hebrew Scriptures wrote, that "while the author succeeds in drawing attention to important texts and issues, the flaws in the presentation would result in more misunderstanding than clarity for lay readers.

He wrote Understanding Wisdom Literature: Conflict and Dissonance in the Hebrew Text in 2013. In a review of Understanding Wisdom Literature in Christian Century, Marti Steussy noted, “the themes of diversity and conflict dominate Penchansky’s discussion of the Hebrew Bible’s wisdom books.” However, some see this as a liability. Katherine Dell in The Journal of Theological Studies wonders if “Penchansky may have overstated this aspect.” Peter Hatton in Review of Biblical Literature has stated, “. . . his determination to focus on conflict and dissonance results in a curious silence about the many beauties of this enigmatic but engaging book. . . “ Hatton also wondered if Penchansky’s use of contemporary criteria to evaluate the ancient texts might indicate, “the inappropriateness of the criteria he seeks to apply.” In Christianity Today, Charles Halton observes, “instead of reconciling the tensions within wisdom literature he revels in them.”

After publishing Understanding Wisdom Literature, he turned his attention to the Qur’an. He has presented papers about the Qur’an at various academic conferences.

He is a member of the Society of Biblical Literature, the International Qur’anic Studies Association, and the Catholic Biblical Association.

His most recent book, Solomon and the Ant: Qur’an and Bible in Dialogue, was published in 2021.

== Personal life ==
He is married to Hend Al-Mansour, an artist from Saudi Arabia.

== Bibliography ==
- Understanding Wisdom Literature : Conflict and Dissonance in the Hebrew Text. Eerdmans, Grand Rapids, MI, 2012. ISBN 9780802867063
- Twilight of the Gods: Polytheism in the Hebrew Bible. St. Louis, Westminster/John Knox, 2005. ISBN 978-0664228859
- What Rough Beast?: Images of God in the Hebrew Bible. 7 Louisville: Westminster/John Knox, 1999. ISBN 978-0664256456
- The Politics of Biblical Theology : A Postmodern Reading 1995, in Mercer Press (Studies in American Biblical Hermeneutics Series : 10) ISBN 9780865544628"
- The Betrayal of God: Ideological Conflict in Job Westminster/John Knox, 1990.
- Co-editor, with Paul Reddit. Shall Not the Judge of All the Earth Do What is Right?: Studies on the Nature of God in Tribute to James L. Crenshaw. Eisenbraun, 2000. ISBN 9781575065212
