= Clayton Littlewood =

English writer

Clayton David Littlewood
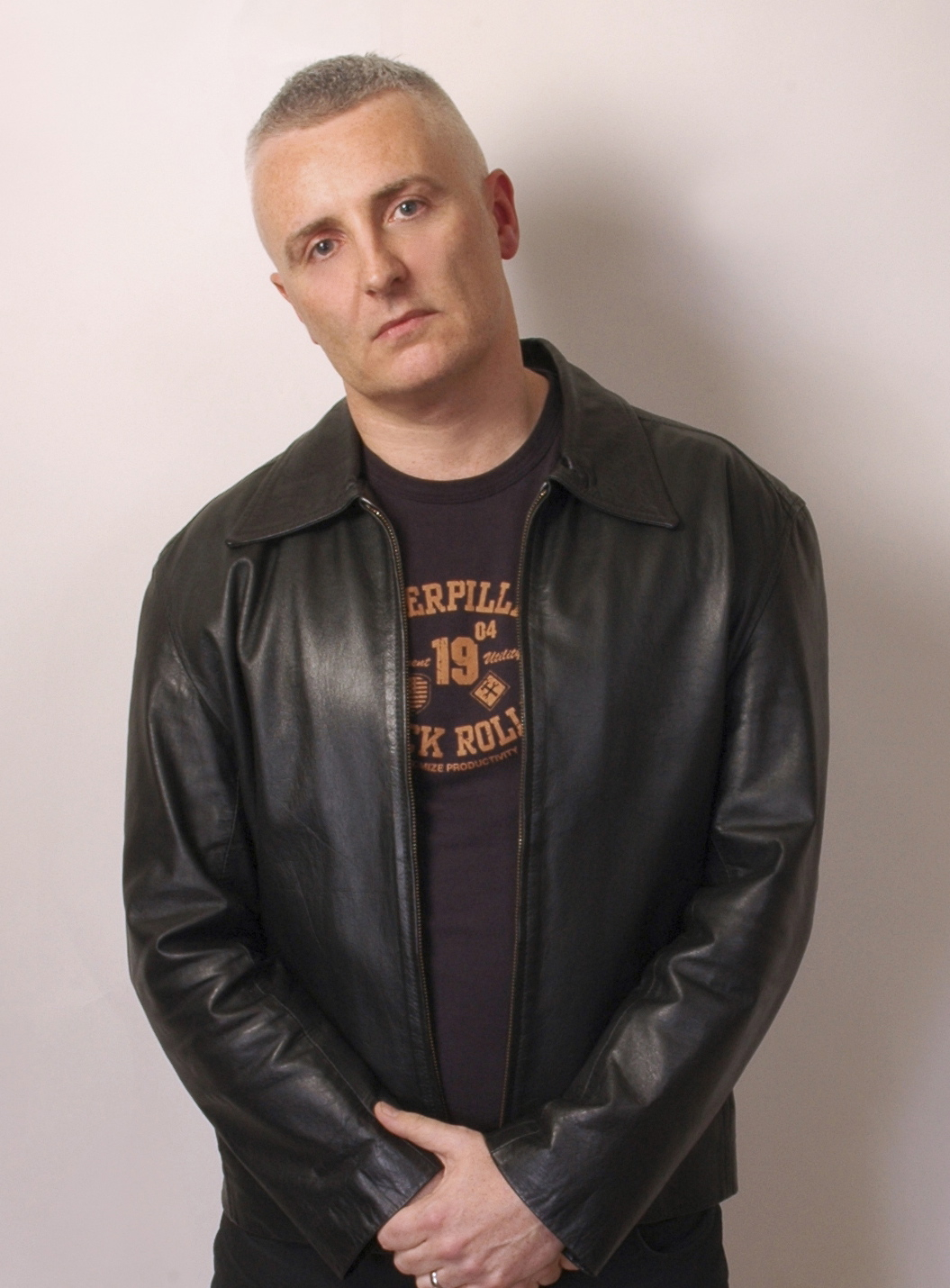
- Born: 1 June 1963 (age 63); Skegness, England
- Occupations: Author, playwright
- Website: www.claytonlittlewood.com

Clayton Littlewood (born in 1963 in Skegness) is the author of the book/play Dirty White Boy: Tales of Soho and the sequel, Goodbye to Soho (May 2012).

== Life ==
Raised in Weston-Super-Mare, Littlewood attended Walliscote Primary School and Broadoak Comprehensive moving to London when he was nineteen. On arriving at London, he formed a band with his friend Rob Brown called Spongefinger. The band recorded an album's worth of material and released a single called I Love to be Queer. The single was reviewed in the gay press and played in the clubs but failed to chart.

Clayton then went back to university and completed a B.S.C. Hons degree in Cultural Studies and an M.A. in Film and Television.

In July 1997 Littlewood went to New York to try and meet Julie Andrews (who was appearing in Victor, Victoria) and give her a song he'd written called Last Night I Dreamt I was Julie Andrews. By the time he got there, she had already left the production. Clayton then telephoned Quentin Crisp and spent the day with him (Littlewood describes this meeting in his latest book Goodbye to Soho).

In 1998 Clayton hosted a pirate radio station in Brighton posing as a 75-year-old West Country female aromatherapist by the name of Dr. Bunty.

In 1999 Littlewood wrote a six-episode comedy series with Joe Pearson called Roots. It was rejected by a number of agents and broadcasters including the BBC who wrote, "This is the most disgusting piece of filth we have ever read. Do not contact us again."

Clayton met his partner Jorge Betancourt in South Beach in March 2004. They got married in Provincetown (at the top of the Provincetown Monument) on 28 October 2005. Under the December 2005 ruling of the UK's Civil Partnership Act 2004 Jorge was thus able to move to the UK (Jorge's move to London was one of the first cases that the British Consulate in New York had dealt with). Jorge died in July 2015.

== Dirty White Boy ==
=== Shop ===
In January 2006 Jorge closed down his high fashion menswear Provincetown shop, Dirty White Boy, and with Littlewood re-opened it on Old Compton Street in London's Soho. Clayton and Jorge lived below their Soho shop.

In August 2006 Littlewood joined Myspace and started a diary/blog charting day-to-day Soho life. It quickly gained a cult following and in 2007, after a number of his stories had been published in The London Paper, Clayton was given a weekly column called 'Soho Stories'.

Between 2007 and 2008 Littlewood was invited to appear on BBC Radio London a number of times to read out his stories. However, on two occasions he and his friend, the actor David Benson, were removed from the building for using language that the BBC found to be unacceptable.

=== Book ===
In January 2008 Clayton was approached by Cleis Press to turn his blog into a book.

Clayton delivered his first reading in February 2008 at the LGBT History Month event called 'Between the Covers' (organised by the House of Homosexual Culture) where readers included Neil Bartlett and Maureen Duffy. Clayton was joined on stage by David Benson who provided the character voices while Clayton narrated.

Due to the recession in June 2008 Dirty White Boy (the shop) was declared insolvent.

Dirty White Boy: Tales of Soho was published in October 2008 and the book launch was held in Soho's The Colony Room (one of the last events held there before it closed). Reviews compared the book to the diaries of Samuel Pepys and Virginia Woolf and to Christopher Isherwood's Berlin stories. It was named Gay Times Book of the Year (2009) and was endorsed by celebrities such as Elton John, Stephen Fry, Holly Johnson and Sebastian Horsley.

Interviewed in Polari Magazine Clayton said, "I've always written diaries. I've kept them for years, but just sporadically, during important moments. So, when we had the shop I thought, 'This is going to be an important moment'. I had a feeling we weren't going to be there very long, and I wanted to document the period. We were getting all these crazy people coming into the shop, all these mad characters, but I thought rather than just write it as a diary I would post it on MySpace. It was the first time that I'd shown anybody what I had written."

In December 2008 Clayton appeared on stage at the Freedom Bar in Soho reading from Dirty White Boy: Tales of Soho alongside Sebastian Horsley.

=== Play ===
In April 2009 Clayton turned Dirty White Boy: Tales of Soho into a play. It premiered at the Trafalgar Studios in London's West End and starred Clayton, David Benson and singer Maggie K de Monde, featuring music from Martin Watkins. It sold out.

Interviewed in Whatsonstage, Clayton said, "I was interested in writing about the real Sohoites. The street people. The pimps. The rent boys. The bag ladies. The hookers. The transsexuals. The old queens. All those on the outside I guess."

The play returned a year later, again at the Trafalgar Studios, for an extended run. This time it featured Clayton, David and singer Alexis Gerred. The play was directed by Phil Willmott and received good reviews from Nicholas de Jongh (Evening Standard) and Paul Gambaccini.

== Goodbye to Soho ==
On 10 May 2012 Clayton released a sequel to Dirty White Boy called Goodbye to Soho (DWB Press). The book launch was held at Madame Jojo's in Soho where Clayton read from the book, performed scenes from the play, and delivered a dedication to his friend Sebastian Horsley. Clayton was joined on stage by Roger Lloyd-Thompson, Maggie K de Monde and Martin Watkins (Maggie and Martin were launching their album, Union).

Advanced Reviews

'Clayton's has been seduced by Soho's sleazy magic and through him so are we.' —Marc Almond

'A frank, funny and moving read.'—GT Magazine

'Enchanting and addictive...earthy, scurrilous and never dull.'—West End Extra

'As scurrilous and entertaining as ever.' —Rupert Smith (Man's World)

'Like Isherwood's Berlin, Littlewood's Soho comes to life right off the page.' —Jonathan Kemp (London Triptych)

'Downright Dickensian...not simply a good writer but a great writer.' —Polari Magazine

'That dirty old whore Soho has no better pimp than Clayton Littlewood.' —Tim Fountain (Resident Alien)

'Beautifully composed vignettes...observed by a ravenous, compassionate, amused voyeur of the first rank.' —Nicholas de Jongh (Plague Over England)

== Reviews ==
=== Dirty White Boy (book) ===
"Touching, funny and poignant." – Sir Elton John

"Funny, perceptive, sexy, exquisitely observed." – Stephen Fry

"A 21st Century Samuel Pepys of the Soho subculture." – Holly Johnson

"A collection of witty and piquant vignettes." – The London Paper (London)

"Clayton Littlewood's book is tender, warm and full of humanity." – New Statesman (London)

"His novel truly shines." – Gay Times (Book of the Year 2009)

"Downright hysterical." – QX magazine (London)

"As evocative in its own way as Christopher Isherwood's take on that other sin bin, the Berlin of the 1920s...probably the best book about one section of Soho life...a twenty first century love story to Soho." – The Soho Society

"Soho is like an upturned dustbin and he like a drunk rummaging through it. He shows us that all that glitters is not gold. And all that smells is not garbage." – Sebastian Horsley, author of Dandy in the Underworld

"It is because of Clayton's genuine interest in the people he writes about that Dirty White Boy is such a compelling read."- Polari Magazine

"A sense of historic Soho (Rimbaud and Verlaine, Quentin Crisp) percolates through the book." – One80 magazine

"Original anecdotes and real life stories told with a Hogarthian incisiveness." – West End Extra

"Clayton Littlewood evokes the sights and smells of an historic gaybourhood."- Toronto Star (Canada)

"Funny. Observant. Gives a sense of gay history without being preachy. Compulsively readable... like one of those historic diaries like Samuel Pepys' or Virginia Woolf's." – Gay NZ.com (New Zealand)

"The queer descendent of Samuel Pepys, Clayton Littlewood captures the day-to-day drama of his London in all its demented glory." – Michael Thomas Ford, author of Alec Baldwin Doesn't Love Me and Last Summer

"Dirty White Boy does for Soho in the digital age what Samuel Pepys and Daniel Defoe did for London in the 17th Century…their stories are what makes Dirty White Boy such a wonderful book." – AfterElton.com

=== Dirty White Boy (play) ===
"I really enjoyed Dirty White Boy. I was by turns moved, much amused, charmed and affected." – Nicholas de Jongh. The Evening Standard

"Everyone has a story to tell if only he can recognize and communicate it. Clayton has found his. He tells it with truth and humour." – Paul Gambaccini

"Characters are brought to funny-poignant and vibrant life…I did have a fabulous time." – The British Theatre Guide

"Genuine belly laughs." – What's on Stage

"Great entertainment." – Film News.co.uk

"Camp, rude and very funny!" – Remotegoat.co.uk

"A world where a sense of humour is as vital as blood circulation." – Spoonfed.co.uk

"The combination of a talented actor and a brilliant storyteller makes for the odd moment of theatrical gold." – Gaydarnation

"There is something about Clayton that draws out the weird and wonderful. It's what makes Dirty White Boy so compelling." – Polari Magazine

"Mr. Littlewood's writing shone so swiftly, fiercely, and emotionally that one laughed out loud while clutching an imaginary tissue for the kickback...This is not acting, it's breathtaking authenticity." – The Hospital Club

== Bibliography ==
- Dirty White Boy: Tales of Soho, Cleis Press, 2008
- Goodbye to Soho, DWB Press, 2012
