= Tamara Munzner =

American computer scientist

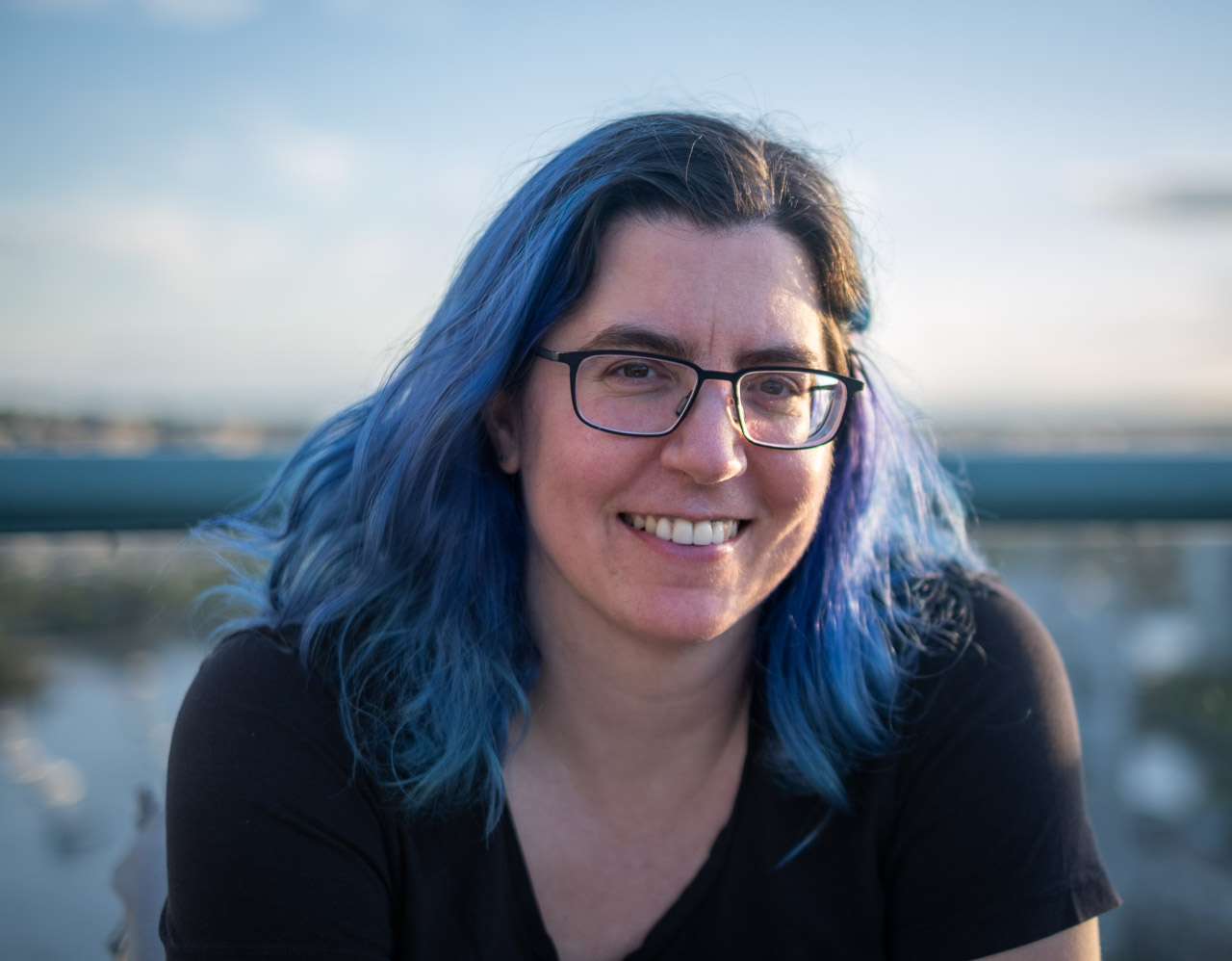
- Tamara Munzner in Vancouver in 2020
- Born: 1969 (age 56–57); Minneapolis, Minnesota, U.S.
- Citizenship: American, Canadian
- Education: Stanford University (BS, PhD)
- Father: Aribert Munzner
- Scientific career
- Fields: Computer Science, Information Visualization
- Workplaces: University of Minnesota (1991–1995); University of British Columbia (2002–present)
- Thesis: Interactive Visualization of Large Graphs and Networks (2000)
- Doctoral advisor: Pat Hanrahan

Tamara Macushla Munzner (born 1969) is an American-Canadian scientist. She is an expert in information visualization who works as a professor of computer science at the University of British Columbia (UBC).

== Early life ==
Tamara Macushla Munzner was born in 1969 in Minneapolis, Minnesota. She is the daughter of abstract painter Aribert Munzner. She graduated from South High School in 1986. She earned a Bachelor of Science degree in computer science from Stanford University in 1991. She returned to Stanford for her graduate studies, completing her Ph.D. in 2000 under the supervision of Pat Hanrahan. Her thesis, Interactive Visualization of Large Graphs and Networks, involved using hyperbolic geometry to visualize large graphs.

== Career ==
Munzner worked as an intern at ETA Systems in the 1980s while still in college. Munzner then worked at The Geometry Center at the University of Minnesota from 1991 to 1995. There, she helped produce two mathematical visualization videos, one about turning spheres inside-out and another about the different topological structures that a three-dimensional universe could have.

She interned at Microsoft Research and Silicon Graphics. After receiving her Ph.D., she became a research scientist at the Compaq Systems Research Center in 2000, before joining the University of British Columbia faculty as an assistant professor of computer science in the summer of 2002.

Munzner is the author of the book Visualization Analysis and Design (CRC Press, 2014). She was program co-chair of the InfoVis conference in 2003 and 2004, and of EuroVis in 2009 and 2010. She has served as the chair of the steering committee of Institute of Electrical and Electronics Engineers (IEEE) InfoVis and the executive committee of IEEE Visualization.

== Selected publications ==
- Munzner, T (2014). Visualization Analysis and Design CRC Press.
- Munzner, T (2009). A Nested Model for Visualization Design and Validation IEEE Trans. Visualization and Computer Graphics 15(6):921-928.
- Munzner, T (2012), with Sedlmair, M. Design Study Methodology: Reflections from the Trenches and the Stacks IEEE Trans. Visualization and Computer Graphics 18(12):2421-2440.

== Recognition ==
In 2015, Munzner received the IEEE VGTC Visualization Technical Achievement Award "in recognition of her foundational research that has produced a scientific basis for principles and design choices for visualization". In 2019, Munzner was awarded a 10-Year Test of Time award from IEEE InfoVis. Her nested model of visualization design and validation, published in 2009, guided designers from a problem in an application domain to abstractions for the problem and data, to the design of visual encoding and interaction techniques, to efficient instantiation through algorithms. She was elected as an IEEE Fellow, in the 2023 class of fellows, "for contributions to principles, processes, and design for visualization".
