= Adrift in Soho =

1961 novel by Colin Wilson

- First Edition
- Author: Colin Wilson
- Language: English
- Publisher: Victor Gollancz
- Publication date: 1961
- Publication place: United Kingdom
- Media type: Print (Paperback)

Adrift In Soho is a novel by Colin Wilson. It was first published in England in 1961 by Victor Gollancz. The novel describes the English Beat Generation.

== Plot ==
A coming of age story, the book begins in the summer of 1955, as nineteen-year-old Harry Preston moves to London. Having been granted an early discharge from national service with the RAF, he leaves his provincial English home town to find life and adventure. Fancying himself as a writer, he drifts towards the central district of Soho. Harry meets an out of work actor, James Compton Street. Street introduces Harry to the destitute but creative environment of the new Beat Generation. Harry travels upwards through this new world of not only artists and writers, but con men, counts, and rich literary benefactors, and begins to find his place in the world.

James Compton Street is based upon an old Soho associate of Wilson's: Charles Russell, aka Charles Belchier, aka Charles Compton Street... a largely out-of-work actor who had bit parts in films such as A Night to Remember and The Prince and the Showgirl (both 1957). He wrote a short memoir entitled The Other Side of Town and, when Wilson became famous in 1956 after the publication of The Outsider, asked him to help find a publisher. Wilson felt it was too short and offered to adapt it into a novel. Thus Adrift in Soho. Russell was paid £100 for his manuscript and shared a percentage of the royalties even though only Part One of the novel is based on his manuscript.

Part Two moves on from Russell’s memoir, away from Soho, to Notting Hill. Wilson said: “I soon used up all Charles’s plot, and decided to extend it with bits of my play The Metal Flower Blossom.”. This had been written by Wilson, in the early 1950s, for a group of teenagers, including the budding novelist Laura Del Rivo, who spent their evenings around Soho. When the group split up, and Wilson went off to Paris, the play remained unperformed and had to wait until December 11, 1960 for its premiere at the Palace Theatre, Westcliff-on-Sea – a one-off performance in front of an audience of 500. It did not appear in print as a play until 2008 when an anthology entitled ‘The Death of God’ and other plays was published by Paupers’ Press.

Russell's The Other Side of Town was published in full in Colin Stanley's The Writing of Colin Wilson's Adrift in Soho in 2026 (see recommended reading, below) and the manuscript is now in Wilson's archive at the University of Nottingham.

== Film adaptation ==
A feature-length film adaptation of Adrift in Soho premiered at the Prince Charles Cinema in London on 14 November 2018, returning for a second engagement the following November. Written and directed by Pablo Behrens, it starred Owen Drake, Caitlin Harris, Chris Wellington and Emily Seale-Jones. It was principally filmed in Nottingham, with the Lace Market district doubling for Soho.

The film diverts from the original novel's conceit, with the production of a documentary on Soho by two filmmakers (styled as members of the Free Cinema movement of the period) serving as the framing narrative. Techniques from the movement, including the use of Dziga Vertov’s ‘camera eye’ montage, are used throughout the fictional narrative. The use of the filmmakers is based on Wilson’s own experiences in London, when he was in contact with members of the Free Cinema movement, appearing in one of their short documentaries.
