= Century (disambiguation) =

A century is a period of 100 years.

Century, The Century or Centuries may also refer to:

== Arts, entertainment and media ==
=== Broadcasting ===
- Century Broadcasting Network, a broadcast company in the Philippines
- Century Network, a former group of independent local radio stations in England
- Century Radio, a former national commercial radio station in Ireland

=== Film and television ===
- Century (film), a 1993 British film
- The Century: America's Time, a 1999 American documentary

=== Literature ===
- Century (1999 book), a coffee table book
- Century (novel), by Fred Mustard Stewart, 1981
- The Century (book), a 2005 non-fiction book by Alain Badiou
- The Century (newspaper), in Nellis Air Force Base in Las Vegas, 1960–1980
- Century Dictionary, an encyclopedic dictionary of the English language
- The Century Magazine, an American magazine 1881–1930
- The League of Extraordinary Gentlemen, Volume III: Century, a comic series
- Magdeburg Centuries, an ecclesiastical history first published 1559–1574

=== Music ===
- Century (American band), a metalcore band
- Century (French band), a French rock band
- "Century" (EsDeeKid song), 2025
- "Century" (The Long Blondes song), 2008
- "Century", a song by Feist from the 2017 album Pleasure
- "Century", a 1991 song by Intastella
- "Century", a song by Big Thief from the 2019 album U.F.O.F.
- "Centuries" (song), by Fall Out Boy, 2014

=== Other uses in arts and entertainment ===
- Centuries, a 1927 Broadway play written and directed by Emjo Basshe
- Century (comics), a Marvel Comics character
- Century: Spice Road, a 2017 table-top strategy game
- Century Media Records, a German record label

== Businesses and organisations ==
- Century (imprint), an imprint of Random House
- Century (marque), a luxury car division from Toyota
- Century Aluminum, an American producer of primary aluminum
- Century Building Society, a Scottish building society
- Century Casinos, an American gambling company
- Century Pacific Food, a food processing company in the Philippines
- Century Properties, a real estate company in the Philippines
- Century Time Gems, Swiss watch maker
- The Century Company, an American publisher 1881–1933
- Century College, in White Bear Lake, Minnesota, U.S.
- Century 21 Real Estate, a real estate company
- Century High School (disambiguation)
- Century Data Systems, defunct American computer storage company

== Places ==
- Century, Florida, U.S.
- Century, West Virginia, U.S., a town in the United States
- Centuries, Hythe, a house in Kent, England
- The Century (Los Angeles), a condominium skyscraper in Century City, California, U.S.
- The Century (Central Park West, Manhattan), an apartment building

== Sports ==
- Century (cricket), a score of 100 or more runs in a single innings by a batter
- Century break in snooker, a score of 100 points or more in one visit at the table without missing a shot
- Century ride, a road cycling ride of 100 miles

== Transportation ==
- Century (ship), the lead cruise ship of the Century-class
- Century-class ferry, of BC Ferries, the only one of which is MV Skeena Queen
- Century (automobile), an early electric vehicle 1911–15
- Buick Century, the model name of several cars
- Toyota Century, a luxury sedan
- Century Series, a group of American fighter aircraft between F-100 and F-106

== Other uses ==
- Century plant, Agave americana, a species of flowering plant
- Century type family, a family of serif type faces

== See also ==
- Century Building (disambiguation)
- Century City (disambiguation)
- Century House (disambiguation)
- Century Park (disambiguation)
- Century Theatre (disambiguation)
- Century Tower (disambiguation)
- One Hundred Years (disambiguation)
- List of centuries, and millenniums
- Centuria, a Latin term for military units consisting of (originally) 100 men, and a Roman unit of land area
- Centaurium or centaury, a genus of species in the gentian family
