= Ken Griffiths (photographer) =

New Zealand-born photographer

Kenneth James Griffiths (7 June 1945 – 20 August 2014) was a New Zealand-born photographer, best remembered for his advertising and photojournalism from the 1970s onwards.

== Early life ==
Griffiths was born in Christchurch, New Zealand, the eldest of five brothers. His father, Edward Rae Griffiths, was a manufacturer of leather goods from South Wales, and his mother, Gwladys Winson Griffiths, a teacher from Cornwall. In 1969, at the age of 23, Ken travelled from New Zealand and began studying photography at the Royal College of Art (RCA), where he was taught by professors John Hedgecoe and Michael Langford.

In 1971, while at the RCA, Griffiths was named the Daily Telegraph Magazine's "Young Photographer of the Year", an award which subsequently earned him a job at the Sunday Times Magazine. He used the prize money to travel through the Soviet Union, recording the experience in photographs published in the Daily Telegraph Magazine's 1973 article 'Life on Buttermilk and Tenterhooks'.

== Photographic career ==
Griffiths began his professional career with the Sunday Times in 1973. He was, alongside Don McCullin, one of the few photographers on the staff contract. One of his first projects at this time was a series of twelve portraits entitled 'In an English Country Garden'. Each month, for a year, he photographed an elderly couple, Mr and Mrs Sweetman, in their garden in the village of Three Cups Corner, East Sussex. Published in the Sunday Times Magazine in 1974, the series later became well known internationally because of a misunderstanding. The absence of Mrs Sweetman in the final portrait caused the series to be interpreted as a poignant symbol of love and loss. In fact, she found it too cold to venture out for the final shot, and can be seen looking out through the kitchen window. Mr Sweetman stands in his wife's accustomed spot, not for any romantically metaphorical reason, but simply to avoid obscuring that window. The photographs were later displayed in the Sunday Times Magazine 50th Anniversary exhibition at the Saatchi Gallery in 2012. In the accompanying print edition of the magazine, and subsequently in the book Zeit Wert geben, published in 2013.

Throughout the 1980s and 90s, Griffiths' work featured in various magazines with a reputation for high photographic standards, including Independent Saturday magazine, Geo, Condé Nast Traveller (from the first issue, launched by Harold Evans in 1987), Vogue, Vanity Fair, Harper's Bazaar, and the Sunday Times. He also created images for the advertising campaigns of many businesses, including MG cars, British Telecom, British Airways, Ford, Renault, Smirnoff, Visa, Volvo, Sainsbury's, and Pirelli. In 1998, Griffiths was commissioned by the Young and Rubicam advertising agency to photograph Ronaldo, the star of the Brazilian football team, for Pirelli's World Cup campaign. The footballer is depicted in his trademark celebratory pose, arms outstretched, and his image replaces that of the statue of Christ the Redeemer, which dominates the summit of Mount Corcovado, overlooking Rio de Janeiro. The image caused considerable controversy within the Catholic Church.

During a 1987 assignment in Clarendon, Texas, a truck happened to park in front of him, and a father and his young son emerged, similarly dressed in cowboy boots and hats. Griffiths decided to take a picture, which subsequently led to Guess commissioning photographs for a book, The Panhandle, designed by Derek Birdsall RDI. Griffiths enjoyed the spontaneity of the event, saying the following year that these pictures were not planned and allowed him to express what he felt was most important about photography, the recording of life as it really is, in that very moment. The image 'Cornfield' and the aforementioned father-and-son 'Clarendon Cowboys' from the Panhandle project appeared, with two other of Griffith's images, in printer Robin Bell's 2009 book Silver Footprint: 35 Years of Darkroom Printing, and were later exhibited at the Richard Young Gallery and The Lucy Bell Gallery. The book (published by Dewi Lewis) and the accompanying exhibitions inspired the subsequent documentary film, The Silver Footprint, directed by Richard Dunkley.

Griffiths was also an acclaimed portraitist, and his subjects included John Lee Hooker, Sting, Bo Diddley, Adam Ant, Bob Geldof, and Keith Richards. Ken's images of Keira Knightley and Sienna Miller were used as the front cover for the film 'The Edge of Love', and his 1985 shot of Princess Margaret holding a pillow embroidered with the words 'It's not Easy being a Princess', was not seen until 2002, when it was used in the Sunday Telegraph's announcement of her death. He also photographed Lucian Freud, and Freud's lifelong friend, the photographer and picture editor Bruce Bernard. Griffiths' photography would later appear in the book Century, released in 2000 just before Bernard's death, and marketed as a chronicle of the twentieth century.

== Personal projects ==
=== The Dossers ===
'The Dossers' was a series of photographs, documenting the lives of the homeless community of Lincoln's Inn Fields, before authorities forced them to relocate. Ian Parker, writing in the Independent Magazine in 1992, noted that Griffiths had established a bond of trust with the community over many years, saying 'they know he is from a different tradition of photography to the young men who steal images and are liable to get chased away in a hail of empty Tennent's Super lager cans. The portrait of 'Julie' from this series was selected in 2018 by the Association of Photographers for a retrospective exhibition of the top 50 images of the past 50 years, which 'helped to shape public opinion and create change'.

=== Abruzzo ===
In 1990, Griffiths travelled with his friend the writer Norman Thomas di Giovanni to Sant'Eusanio Forconese, Abruzzo, the hometown of di Giovanni's father. He documented the trip in a poignant photo essay, returning the following year to complete a further series of photographs on Sant'Eusanio Forconese and the surrounding area. Photos from their adventures were later collected into a food book, Sapore d'Abruzzo, published in 2008. They also appeared in di Giovanni's book My Father's Village, published in 2018.

=== Smithfield Meat Market ===
In the late 90s, Griffiths worked on Around Midnight, a series of photographs of Smithfield Meat Market in London which captures the final days of the historically traditional market before the extensive modernisation required to meet new European Community regulations.

=== Angola and Cambodia ===
In 1998, impassioned by the fight against the use of land mines in national conflicts, Griffiths travelled to Angola and Cambodia to photograph survivors. The resulting emotionally charged photographs contributed to Handlines, published by Phaidon in aid of the British Red Cross Anti-Personnel Landmines Campaign. Griffiths wanted to capture in the expressions of his subjects not victimhood, but the will to survive, the deep strength and dignity that showed in their faces. He hoped his photographs would highlight and shame the corrupt social and political systems which allowed such horrors to occur. The Handlines book was subsequently sold at the National Portrait Gallery in London.

=== Chubut ===
During 2001 and 2002, Griffiths and Norman Thomas di Giovanni embarked on three expeditions to Chubut in Argentina, accompanied by Edi Dorian Jones, author of Capillas Galesas en Chubut (2000). Jones introduced them to the Welsh communities, whose forebears had migrated to Argentina in 1865, and whose culture and language remained resolutely Welsh, having survived the upheaval brought about by the Industrial Revolution. The resulting photographs inspired the film Patagonia, directed by Marc Evans, and starring Matthew Rhys, and an exhibition in 2011, at the Ffotogallery in Penarth, celebrating the Welsh communities of Chubut.

=== China ===
From 2002 to 2004, Griffiths travelled to China to document the contentious Three Gorges dam project on the Yangtze River, the largest building project in China since the Great Wall. His photographs of the mountainous landscape invoked the style of traditional Chinese silk paintings, achieving a painterly quality through the use of a laborious Carbro printing process (see Field camera below). These photos were published in Condé Nast Traveller and, in 2005, they formed the basis of the 'Three Gorges' exhibition at the Michael Hoppen Gallery, London.

== Field camera ==
Griffiths' tool of choice was a Gandolfi field camera, a bulky device, hand-crafted in mahogany, with brass furniture and leather bellows, the design of which has remained essentially unchanged since the mid 19th century. He claimed that the considerable time required to set up his equipment afforded him a valuable opportunity to develop a greater rapport with his subjects, something he believed was often absent on photographic assignments; and gave them a choice as to whether they were to be photographed. The large format sheet film employed, commonly 10 by 8 inches (250 mm × 200 mm), produced images of very high resolution, allowing for the creation of larger prints without sacrificing quality.

A lifelong advocate for the Gandolfi company, Griffiths became good friends with the Gandolfi brothers, taking great pains to ensure that they were well cared for during the final years of their lives. Working with his brother David, Griffiths put together a 90-minute documentary, Gandolfi - Family Business, a warmly affectionate celebration of a dying craft. Filming began in 1982, and continued for some 20 years, the documentary being premiered at the Sheffield International Documentary Festival in 2004. The film was selected for a British Film Institute sponsored tour of UK cinemas, and played to a full house at the National Film Theatre. The digitally remastered film was released on DVD in 2018, one year after the Gandolfi company finally closed its doors.

Griffiths' choice of development processes (platinotype for monochrome and the carbro process for colour images) was equally old-fashioned, but the results were imbued with a painterly quality, and particularly resistant to fading. The carbro technique is particularly labour-intensive and was virtually obsolete when Griffiths gave it a new lease of life.

== Death ==
Ken Griffiths died in 2014 at the age of 69, after a long battle with Motor Neuron Disease. He is buried in the hills of Bala, Gwynedd.
