= Central City (disambiguation) =

A central city or core city is the largest or most important city or cities of a metropolitan area.

Central city may also refer to:

- A central business district, the commercial and business centre of a city
- In China:
  - The urban core of a prefecture-level city (as opposed to the much larger region it governs)
  - A national central city, one of a group of cities tasked with leading political, cultural and economic development

== Places ==
=== South Africa ===
- Cape Town Central City, Capetown's central business bistrict

=== United States ===
- Central City, Alabama
- Central City, Arkansas
- Central City, Colorado
- Central City, Houston
- Central City, Illinois
- Central City, Iowa
- Central City, Jefferson Territory
- Central City, Kentucky
- Central City, Louisiana, East Baton Rouge Parish
- Central City, Nebraska
- Central City, New Orleans, Louisiana, a neighborhood
- Central City, Ohio
- Central City, Pennsylvania
- Central City, Phoenix, urban village
- Central City, Salt Lake City, Utah
- Central City, South Dakota
- Central City, Virginia

== Developments ==
- Central City (Seoul), a bus terminal with hotel and shopping mall in Seoul
- Central City (Surrey), a shopping mall and office tower complex in Surrey, British Columbia, Canada

== Fictional places ==
- Central City (DC Comics), the home of the second version of the superhero the Flash
- Central City, the home of comics character the Spirit
- Central City, the original home base of the Fantastic Four (who now reside in Manhattan)
- Central City, the capital city in Conquest of the Planet of the Apes
- Central City, the capital city in the 1974 Planet of the Apes TV series
- Central City, the capital of Amestris in the manga and anime Fullmetal Alchemist
- Central City, a capital in the Sonic the Hedgehog video game series
- Central City (Tin Man), the capital of the Outer Zone in the 2007 Sci Fi television miniseries Tin Man
- Central City, the home of the human allies of the Autobots in The Transformers
- Central City, the future capital of Earth in 1960s Doctor Who stories

== Music ==
- Central City (album), a 2023 album by Big Freedia
- Central City May Rise Again, an album by the Cape May

== Sports ==
- Central City FC, a soccer club based in Central Melbourne, Australia
