= Century Publishing =

Century Publishing can refer to:

- Century Publishing, a custom media publisher based in Salt Lake City, Utah, U.S., founded in 1981 by Larry L. Richman, name changed to Century Publishing in 1995
- Century, an imprint of Cornerstone, formerly part of Random House, now Penguin Random House
- The Century Company, an American publishing company, 1881–1933

== See also ==
- Century House (publisher)
- Century (disambiguation)
