= First Hundred Years =

First Hundred Years may refer to:

- First 100 Years, British campaign celebrating women in law
- The First Hundred Years, 1950s American TV series
- The First Hundred Years (film), 1938 American film

== See also ==
- 1st century
- First Hundred Years' War
- First hundred days (disambiguation)
- The Second Hundred Years (disambiguation)
- One Hundred Years (disambiguation)
