= MK Gallery =

Art gallery in Milton Keynes, England

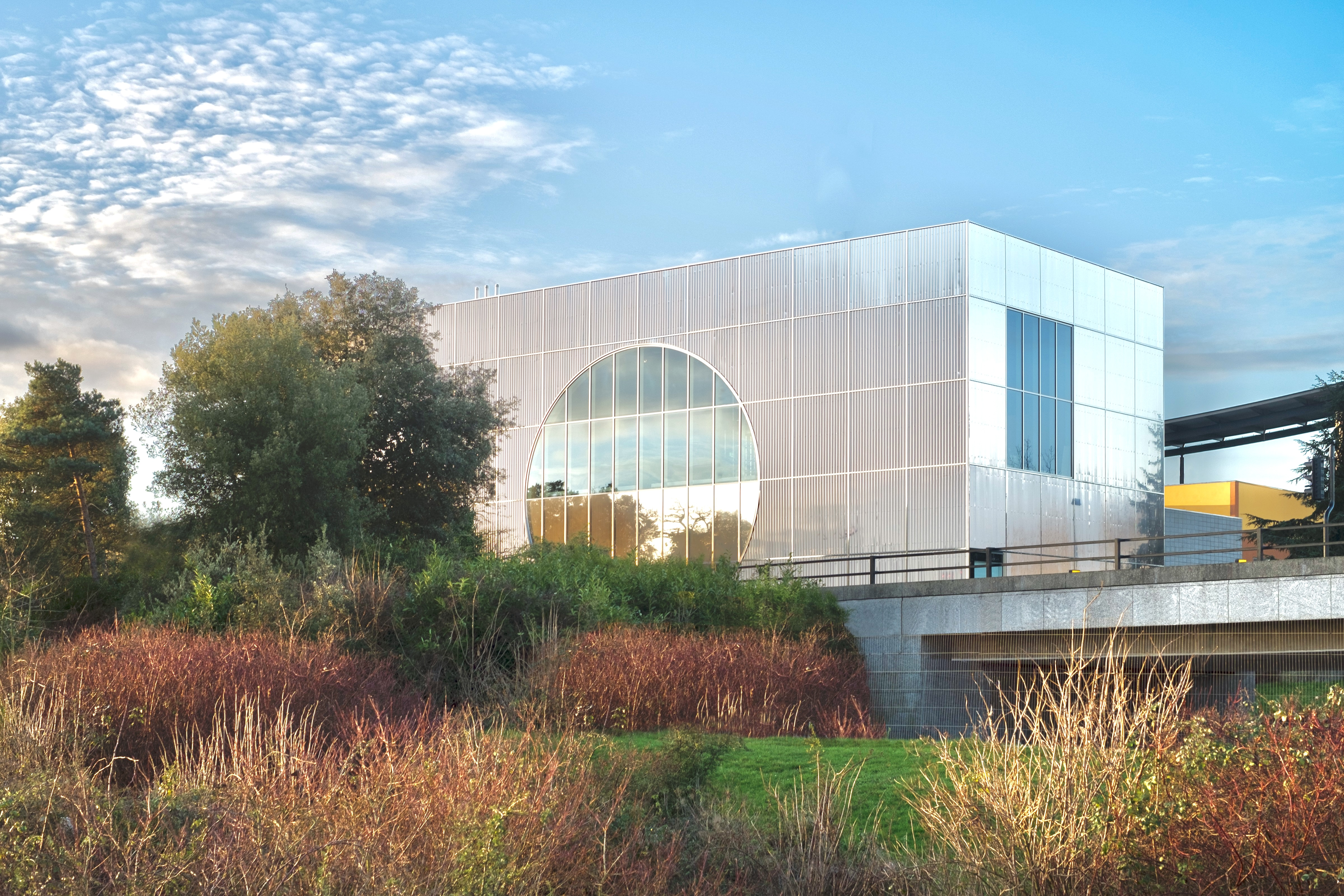
- Established: 1999; 27 years ago
- Location: 900 Midsummer Boulevard, Central Milton Keynes, MK9 3PX
- Coordinates: 52.045°N 0.749°W
- Type: Art gallery and cinema
- Architects: Blonski-Heard; 6a
- Owner: Milton Keynes City Council
- Public transit access: Milton Keynes Central railway station, "Theatre District" stop on most bus routes.
- Website: mkgallery.org

MK Gallery (also 'Milton Keynes Gallery' or 'MK G') is the municipal art gallery of Milton Keynes, a city in Buckinghamshire about 50 miles (80 km) northwest of London. The gallery was extended and remodelled in 2018/19 and includes an art-house cinema. It does not have a permanent collection.

== History ==
The gallery was founded in 1999 under the management of the Milton Keynes Theatre and Gallery Company.

The Gallery partially closed from 2015 to 2019 for a substantial expansion and renovation. The building now has five exhibition galleries, an auditorium/cinema and a studio.

== Exhibitions ==
The more notable exhibitions presented by the gallery include:

1990s

- Gilbert & George: The Rudimentary Pictures (1999-2000)

2000s

- Mark Francis: Elements (2000)
- Richard Hamilton: New Technology and Printmaking (2000)
- Alison Turnbull: Houses into Flats (2000)
- Richard Wright (2000)
- Richard Ross: Gathering Light (2000–01)
- Jan Dibbets: Ten Cupolas (2000–01)
- John Riddy: Recent Work (2000–01)
- Mark Wallinger: Cave (2001)
- Abigail Lane: Tomorrow’s World, Yesterday’s Fever (Mental Guests Incorporated) (2001)
- Andy Warhol: Cars (2001)
- Dalziel + Scullion: Home (2002)
- Tim Noble and Sue Webster: Ghastly Arrangements (2002)
- Jiri Georg Dokoupil: Every Cloud is a Way (2002)
- Boyd Webb: Horse & Dog (2002)
- Sarah Lucas and others: Temple of Bacchus (2003)
- Boyd & Evans: Landmarks (2004)

2010s

- Paula Rego: Obedience and Defiance (2019)
- George Stubbs: 'all done from nature' (2019–20)

2020s

- Laura Knight: A Panoramic View (2021–22)
- Vivian Maier: Anthology (2022)
- Larry Achiampong: Wayfinder (2022–23)
- Boyd & Evans: High Time (2023)
- Saul Leiter: An Unfinished World (2024)
- Vanessa Bell: A World of Form and Colour (2024-25)
- Andy Warhol: Portrait of America
- Euan Uglow: An Arc From The Eye (2026)

== Current and former directors ==
- Stephen Snoddy
- Michael Stanley
- Anthony Spira

== Cinema ==
The top floor of the gallery has a multi-purpose auditorium overlooking Campbell Park. In its cinema configuration, the auditorium shows international films curated by Curzon Cinemas, as well as live-streamed National Theatre and Royal Opera House performances.
