= Century Building =

Century Building may refer to one of the following structures in the United States:

- The Century (Los Angeles)
- Century Building (17th Street, Manhattan)
- The Century (Central Park West, Manhattan)
- Century Building (Chicago)
- Century Building (Pittsburgh, Pennsylvania)
- Century Building (St. Louis)
- Century Theatre (Detroit) in Detroit, listed on the National Register of Historic Places as the Century Building and Little Theatre

== See also ==
- Century (disambiguation)
- Century Building Society
