= Century House =

Century House may refer to:

- Century House (Ridgeway, South Carolina), a historic plantation house in the U.S.
- Century House, London, a building on Westminster Bridge Road, London, England
- Century House (Manchester), demolished to build Two St Peter's Square, Manchester, England
- Century House (publisher), an American publisher located in Watkins Glen, New York
- "Century House", an unmade episode of Doctor Who

== See also ==
- New Century House, an office in Manchester, England
