= Bruce Bernard =

English art critic (1928–2000)

Bruce Bernard (/bərˈnɑːrd/; 21 March 1928 – 29 March 2000) was an English picture editor, writer and photographer. He wrote for the Sunday Times and the Independent and photographed many influential artists in a career lasting nearly 40 years. Some of Bernard's prints are held in the collection of the National Portrait Gallery, London.

== Early life and education ==
Bernard was born in London, and was the middle of three sons to the English architect Oliver Percy Bernard and his opera singer wife Dora Hodges (d. 1950), who performed under the name of Fedora Roselli. His siblings were the poet Oliver Bernard and the columnist Jeffrey Bernard. He was a paternal cousin to the actor Stanley Holloway.

Bernard had brief spells at a number of boarding schools, eventually finishing at Bedales School. From there he attended, albeit briefly, St Martin's School of Art, before falling into a number of menial jobs within London's Soho. He became a picture editor for History Of the 20th Century in 1968 before moving to the Sunday Times's magazine as a picture researcher in 1972; he later became the paper's picture editor, a post he held until 1980. It was during this time that he produced Photodiscovery: Masterworks of Photography 1840-1940, which became his most successful work.

== Career ==
He left the Sunday Times and joined The Independent where he wrote for the paper's magazine. He wrote Vincent By Himself, about the painter Vincent van Gogh. The book juxtaposed Van Gogh's paintings and drawings and featured excerpts from the letters to the painter's brother, Theo Van Gogh. He also frequently wrote short articles under pseudonyms, including Joe Hodges and Deirdre Pugh, for the Independent.

Writing for The Independent, the columnist Adrian Searle commented: "[Bernard] had a shrewd, passionate eye, and was possessed of one of the most acute bullshit detectors I have ever encountered."

In 1994 Bernard curated a photographic exhibition for the Barbican Centre gallery. His portraits included those of Leigh Bowery, Lucian Freud, Francis Bacon, and Euan Uglow. The photographer John Riddy opined that "Bernard's portraits of British artists are the only one's [sic] to escape cliché." In 1999 he put the finishing touches to the Bruce Bernard Photography Collection for the James Moores Foundation.

The Victoria and Albert Museum held an exhibition of 100 photographs chosen by Bruce Bernard. An accompanying book 100 photographs, A Collection by Bruce Bernard was published by Phaidon Press in 2002.

== Personal life ==
Bernard died of cancer in 2000. In the photographer's obituary, Searle remarked: "[Bernard's] sense of what was good and bad art, good and bad photography had an almost moral dimension, but one which was entirely personal, and thoroughly ethical."

== Publications ==
- Photodiscovery: Masterworks of Photography, 1840-1940 (1980)
- Humanity and Inhumanity: The Photographic Journey of George Rodger (1994)
- Century (1999)
- 100 photographs, A Collection by Bruce Bernard (2002)
- Vincent by himself (2004)

== Collections ==
Bernard's work is held in the following permanent collection:

- National Portrait Gallery, London: 6 prints (as of 16 May 2024)

== General references ==
- Holloway, Stanley; Richards, Dick (1967). Wiv a little bit o' luck: The life story of Stanley Holloway. London: Frewin. OCLC 3647363.
