= The Mephisto Waltz =

1971 film by Paul Wendkos

- Directed by: Paul Wendkos
- Screenplay by: Ben Maddow
- Based on: The Mephisto Waltz by Fred Mustard Stewart
- Produced by: Quinn Martin
- Starring: Alan Alda; Jacqueline Bisset; Barbara Parkins; Bradford Dillman; William Windom; Curt Jürgens
- Cinematography: William W. Spencer
- Edited by: Richard K. Brockway
- Music by: Jerry Goldsmith
- Distributed by: 20th Century-Fox
- Release date: March 25, 1971 (Boston)
- Running time: 115 minutes
- Country: United States
- Language: English

The Mephisto Waltz is a 1971 American supernatural horror film directed by Paul Wendkos and starring Alan Alda, Jacqueline Bisset, Barbara Parkins, Bradford Dillman, and Curt Jürgens. Its plot follows a dying Satanist who attempts to have his soul transferred into the body of a young concert pianist. The name of the film is taken from the piano work of the same title by Franz Liszt. The performance of this work heard in the film is by Jakob Gimpel, although the piece did not appear on the soundtrack album (in this, or any other, performance) when it was released in 1997. Ben Maddow adapted his screenplay from the novel of the same title by Fred Mustard Stewart. The film was the only big-screen work of veteran television producer Quinn Martin. The film is based on The Mephisto Waltz (1969) by Fred Mustard Stewart.

== Plot ==
Myles Clarkson has abandoned his hopes for a career as a concert pianist to become a music journalist. Duncan Ely, a world class piano virtuoso, notices Myles' hands during an interview by him. Duncan and his adult daughter, Roxanne, pursue a friendship with Myles and wife Paula. Paula dislikes both Duncan and Roxanne, and despite her discomfort at the attention being paid to them, Myles feels honored to be considered a friend by Duncan, who is dying of leukemia. Duncan and Roxanne secretly practice Satanism. As Duncan's physical body nears its end, they perform an occult ritual that transfers Duncan's consciousness into Myles' body while Myles’ consciousness is transferred into the body of Duncan as he dies.

Paula notices changes in Myles' personality, including the ability to play piano as well as Duncan. Confused by the changes and oblivious to their origin, she also finds his new persona exciting and attractive. Myles successfully embarks on a career as a pianist and takes over Duncan's concert schedule.

Paula has a nightmare in which she envisions Duncan commanding her to kill her daughter Abby, claiming his Master has insisted on it as "part of the bargain", and marks Abby's forehead with a blue substance. Paula wakes up and finds there actually is a blue substance on her daughter's skin.

Abby's sudden illness and death prompts Paula's deeper suspicion of Roxanne. As Myles become consumed by his new career, Paula investigates Roxanne's background. During her investigation of Roxanne's ex-husband Bill, a romantic relationship forms between the two. Paula is eventually convinced that Duncan and Roxanne struck a deal with Satan to enable them to pursue an incestuous relationship, that they have placed Duncan's consciousness into her husband's body, and that they are responsible for Abby's death.

Paula falls asleep and Bill dies in an apparent accident, though he too has the blue substance on his forehead. Paula nearly meets a similar "accidental" fate, which leaves her certain that Roxanne and Duncan/Myles killed Bill, and fearful that they will try to eliminate her. She wants to remain with whoever is inhabiting her husband's body and employs a Satanic ritual to strike her own bargain with the Devil. She knocks Roxanne unconscious and uses the same dark magic used against Myles to transfer her consciousness into Roxanne's body. Her own dead body remains in the bath, an apparent suicide.

In Roxanne's body, Paula returns to Duncan/Myles to informs her of Paula's suicide. Without revealing her actual identity, she embraces him, excited at the prospect of their new relationship.

== Cast ==
- Alan Alda as Myles Clarkson
- Jacqueline Bisset as Paula Clarkson
- Barbara Parkins as Roxanne
- Bradford Dillman as Bill Delancey (credited as Brad Dillman)
- William Windom as Dr. West
- Kathleen Widdoes as Maggie West
- Pamelyn Ferdin as Abby Clarkson
- Curd Jürgens as Duncan Ely
- Antoinette Bower as a member of Ely's Group (Uncredited)

== Production ==
Exteriors were shot on location along the Pacific coast in California; the book took place in New York City. The film, which was a Quinn Martin Production, was originally given a cinematic release by 20th Century-Fox.

== Reception ==
The film was noted for its stylistic imagery and soundtrack by Jerry Goldsmith. All Movie Guide noted Alan Alda's performance as the film's only weak point, praising the "offbeat cinematography", "truly shocking setpieces", and Jacqueline Bisset's "chillingly effective" performance, stating that these elements build a pervading sensation of doom.

Rotten Tomatoes gives the film a 63% rating based on 8 contemporary and modern reviews.

=== Critical response ===
Roger Ebert gave the movie 2 stars, commenting:

If a horror movie is to be taken seriously, it has to pretend to take horror seriously. And this one doesn't. It reduces magic to a simpleminded ritual that anyone can perform: all our heroine has to do is steal some funny blue stuff and read pig Latin out of a book. The magic works for her, too...The casting (Alan Alda, Jacqueline Bisset, Barbara Parkins, Curt Jurgens) is expensive, and so is the production. But you get the notion that the people who made the film didn't take magic seriously enough. I don't mean they should believe in it; but they should have made a film that pretended to.

Howard Thompson of The New York Times wrote: "The picture, opening yesterday, is terrible. Style and subtlety might have done the trick this time, whatever the merits of Fred Mustard Stewart's novel."

== Soundtrack ==
Varèse Sarabande issued an album of Jerry Goldsmith's score in 1997, paired with a suite from his score for The Other.

1. Twentieth Century Fox Fanfare, 1953 version – Alfred Newman (:14)
2. Main Title (2:27)
3. The Library (1:38)
4. A New Miles (5:12)
5. The Funeral (3:26)
6. A Night in Mexico (2:16)
7. Part of the Bargain (3:41)
8. The Hospital (2:18)
9. The Latest Victim (5:14)
10. Dogfight (2:07)
11. Roxanne's Demise (1:37)
12. End Title (3:45)
13. The Other: Suite (22:02)

== See also ==
- List of American films of 1971
