= Fred Mustard Stewart =

American novelist (1932–2007)

- Born: September 17, 1932; Anderson, Indiana, United States
- Died: February 7, 2007 (aged 74); New York City, United States
- Occupation: Writer
- Writing career
- Genres: Fiction, historical fiction, horror fiction, science fiction
- Notable works: The Mephisto Waltz, Six Weeks, Century, Ellis Island

Fred Mustard Stewart (September 17, 1932 – February 7, 2007) was an American novelist. His most popular books were The Mephisto Waltz (1969), adapted for the 1971 movie of the same name featuring Alan Alda; Six Weeks (1976), made into a 1982 movie of the same name featuring Mary Tyler Moore; Century, a New York Times best-seller in 1981; and Ellis Island (1983), which became a CBS mini-series in 1984.

== Early life and education ==
Stewart attended the Lawrenceville School in New Jersey, class of 1950. He graduated from Princeton University in 1954, where he was a member of the Colonial Club. He originally planned to be a concert pianist, and studied with Eduard Steuermann at the Juilliard School.

== Career ==
In 1978, Stewart published his historical novel A Rage Against Heaven through Viking Press. The story spans the American Civil War, starting with South Carolina's secession from the Union in the first chapter.

Stewart's next book, Ellis Island, was published in 1983. A year after its publication a miniseries of the same name was filmed in the United Kingdom, based on this book.

== Bibliography ==
- The Mephisto Waltz (1969)
- The Methuselah Enzyme (1970)
- Lady Darlington (1971)
- The Mannings (1973)
- Star Child (1974)
- Six Weeks (1976)
- A Rage Against Heaven (0-670-58910-1, 1978): spans the American Civil War, from 1860 to 1871
- Century (1981)
- Ellis Island (1983)
- The Glitter and the Gold (1985)
- The Titan (1985)
- Pomp and Circumstance (1991)
- Savage Family Saga
1. The Magnificent Savages (1996): covers 1850s–1860s
2. The Young Savages (1998): covers 1880s–1890s
3. The Naked Savages (1999): covers 1897–1929
4. The Savages in Love and War (2001): covers 1930–1941
