= Century City (disambiguation) =

Century City is a neighborhood in Los Angeles, California, United States.

Century City may also refer to:

== Places ==
- Century City Center, an under construction skyscraper in the eponymous neighborhood
- Century City station, a future rapid transit station serving the eponymous neighborhood
- Westfield Century City, a shopping mall in the eponymous neighborhood
- Century City (building), a former design for what is now 100 St Georges Terrace in Perth, Western Australia
- Century City, Cape Town, South Africa
- Century City, Makati, Philippines
  - Century City Mall
- Qianjiang Century City, Hangzhou, Zhejiang Province, China
  - Qianjiang Century City station, a rapid transit station that serves the district
- Century City station (Chengdu Metro), a rapid transit station in Chengdu, Sichuan

== Arts and entertainment ==
- Century City (TV series), an American science fiction-legal drama
- "Century City", a song by Tom Petty & the Heartbreakers from the 1979 album Damn the Torpedoes

== See also ==
- Central City (disambiguation)
