= One Hundred Years (disambiguation) =

One Hundred Years or 100 Years may refer to:

- "100 Years" (song), 2003 song by Five For Fighting
- "100 Years", a 2018 song by Florence + the Machine from High as Hope
- 100 Years (film), film due to be released in 2115, one hundred years after production of the film
- The 100 Years Show, 2015 documentary
- One Hundred Years: History of the Chinese in America, a 1952 mural by James Leong.
- "One Hundred Years", a song from the Cure's 1982 album, Pornography (album)

== See also ==
- Year 100
- Century (disambiguation)
- First Hundred Years (disambiguation)
