= Century Park (Haikou) =

Public park in Haikou, China

- 世纪公园
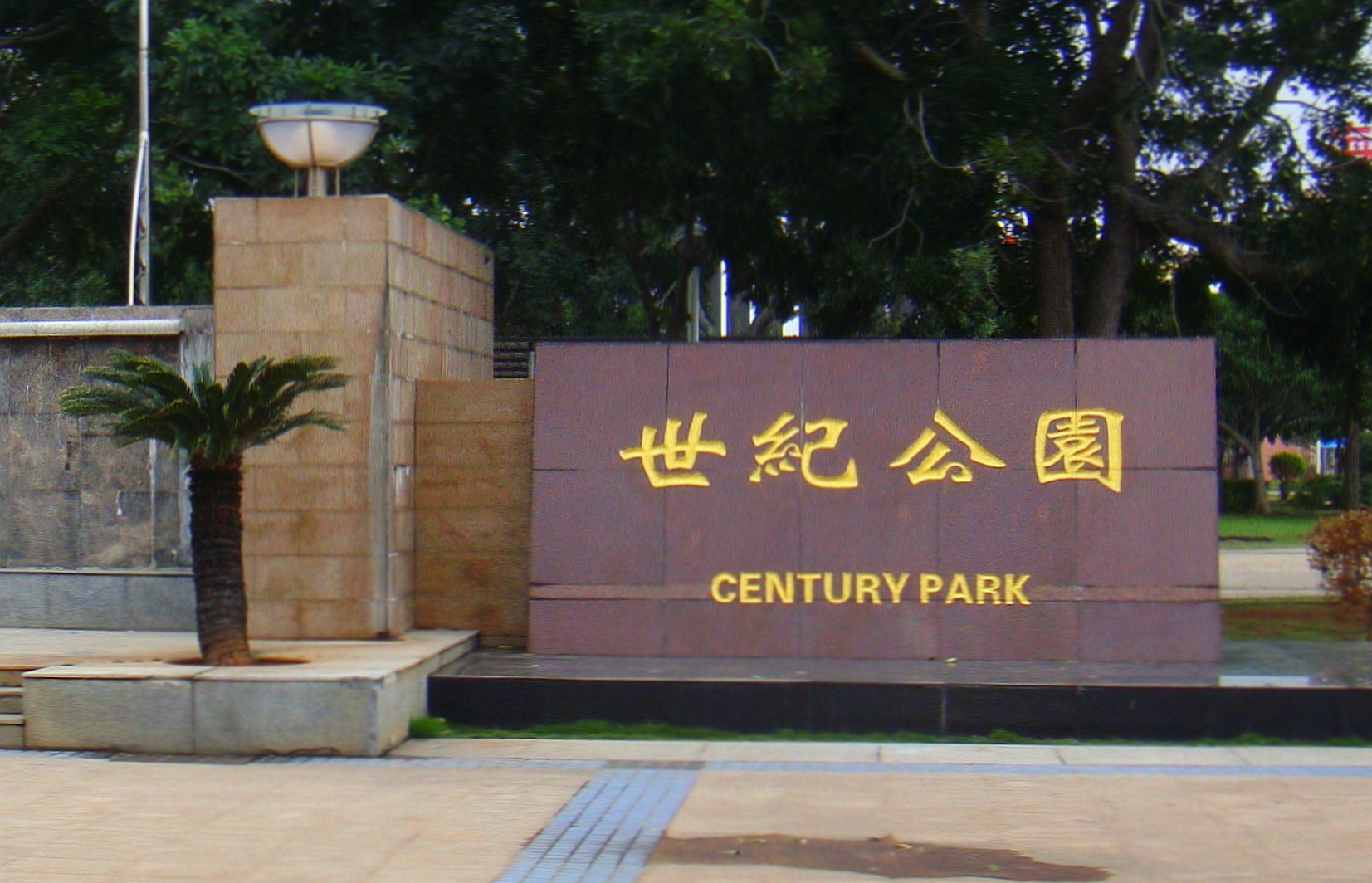
- Interactive map of Century Park
- Type: Urban park
- Location: Longhua District, Haikou, Hainan Province, China
- Coordinates: 20°02′41″N 110°19′08″E
- Created: October 2013
- Status: Open all year

Century Park (Chinese: 世纪公园) is an 8.4-hectare, public park located downtown Haikou, in the Longhua district of the city, Hainan Province, China. It is located northwest of Binhai Park and east of Evergreen Park. The Haikou Century Bridge travels over part of it.

The park was completed in October 2013 and cost approximately 28.28 million RMB to build.

== Layout ==
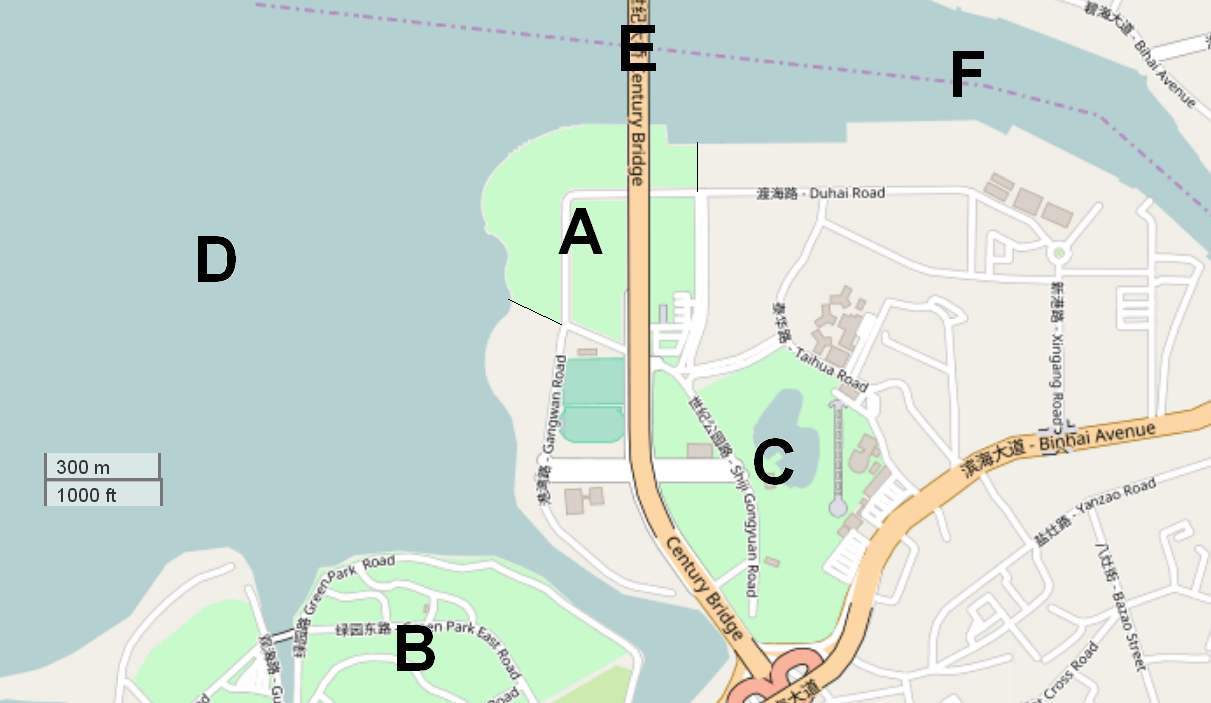
A - Century Park; B - Evergreen Park; C - Binhai Park; D - Haikou Bay; E - Haikou Century Bridge; F - Haidian River

Century Park consists of a grassy area and a large, open area at the west. The park's west side meets Haikou Bay while the north side is at the mouth of the Haidian River.

== Events ==
On May 28, 2017, there was a concert featuring Jay Chou.
