= Hundred Days (disambiguation) =

The Hundred Days was Napoleon Bonaparte's final military campaign in 1815.

Hundred Days may also refer to:

- The Hundred Days (novel), an Aubrey–Maturin novel by Patrick O'Brian, set during Napoleon's 1815 campaign
- Hundred Days (album), a 2009 album by JJ Lin
- Hundred Days (film), a 1935 German-Italian historical film
- Hundred Days Offensive, the Allies' final push at the end of World War I
- Canada's Hundred Days, the last 96 days of World War I
- Hundred Days' War, an extended battle in the Lebanese Civil War
- Hundred Days' Reform, an 1898 reform program in China
- "A Hundred Days", an episode of the TV series Stargate SG-1
- Hundred Days (video game), a 2021 video game
- First hundred days, (alternatively written first 100 days) can often refer to the beginning of a leading politician's term in office

One Hundred Days or 100 Days may refer to:

- 100 Days (1991 film), an Indian thriller
- 100 Days (2001 film), a film about the Rwandan Genocide
- 100 Days (2013 film), a Taiwanese romantic comedy
- 100 Days (2026 film), a Brazilian action drama
- 100 Days (2016 TV series), a Marathi language television series
- 100 Days My Prince, a 2018 South Korean television series
- 100 Days to Heaven, a 2011 Philippine television series
- "100 Days" (Borgen), a 2010 television episode
- Beyond 100 Days, previously known as 100 Days, a BBC News current affairs programme
- "100 Days", the first term (1834–1835) of British prime minister Robert Peel
- "100 Days", the 1994 Rwandan genocide
- One Hundred Days: Memoirs of the Falklands Battle Group Commander, a book by Admiral Sandy Woodward
- One Hundred Days: My Unexpected Journey from Doctor to Patient, a 2000 book by David Biro
- One Hundred Days: The Story of Architects Almost World Tour, a documentary about British metalcore band Architects' 2012 tour
- "One Hundred Days", a song by Mark Lanegean from Bubblegum
- One Hundred Days, a band led by Ian Tanner
- One Hundred Days Government, the first government of Cuban president Ramón Grau

== See also ==
- First hundred days (disambiguation)
- "100 Bad Days", a 2019 single by the American pop band AJR
- Hundred Years' War
- One Hundred Years of Solitude
