= Century Park =

Century Park may refer to:

- Century Park, Edmonton, a transit-oriented development under construction in Alberta, Canada
  - Century Park station (Edmonton), a light rail station associated with Century Park, Edmonton, Alberta, Canada
- Century Park (Haikou), Hainan, China
- Century Park (Shanghai), the biggest park in Shanghai, China
  - Century Park station (Shanghai Metro), a metro station associated with Century Park, Shanghai, China
