= The Second Hundred Years =

The Second Hundred Years may refer to:

- The Second Hundred Years (film), a 1927 American silent comedy short film starring Stan Laurel and Oliver Hardy prior to their official billing as the duo Laurel and Hardy
- The Second Hundred Years (TV series), a 1967 television series
