= Century High School =

There are a number of high schools named Century High School:

- Century High School (Santa Ana, California)
- Century High School (Thousand Oaks, California)
- Century High School (Pocatello, Idaho)
- Century High School (Ullin, Illinois)
- Century High School (Sykesville, Maryland)
- Century High School (Rochester, Minnesota)
- Century High School (Los Lunas, New Mexico)
- Century High School (Bismarck, North Dakota)
- Century High School (Hillsboro, Oregon)
