= Binhai Park =

Park in Haikou, China

Coordinates: 20.04017°N 110.32387°E

Binhai Park 滨海公园
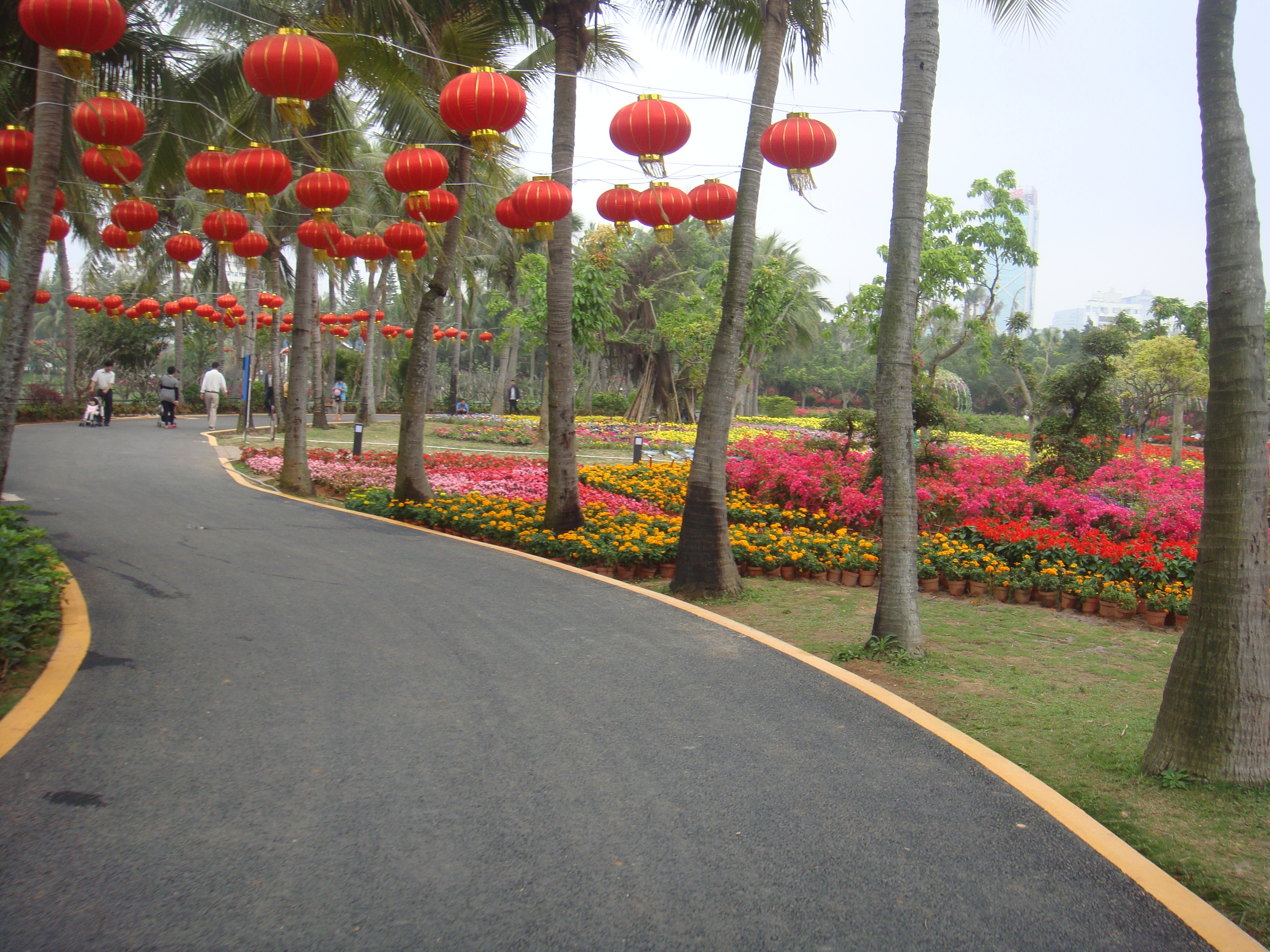
- Binhai Park in March 2016
- Interactive map of Binhai Park 滨海公园
- Type: Urban park
- Location: Haikou City, Hainan Province, China
- Status: Open all year

Binhai Park (Chinese: 滨海公园) is an urban park located on the north side of Binhai Road, Haikou City, Hainan Province, China. It was once called Hainan (Haikou) Youth Technology Park.

== History ==
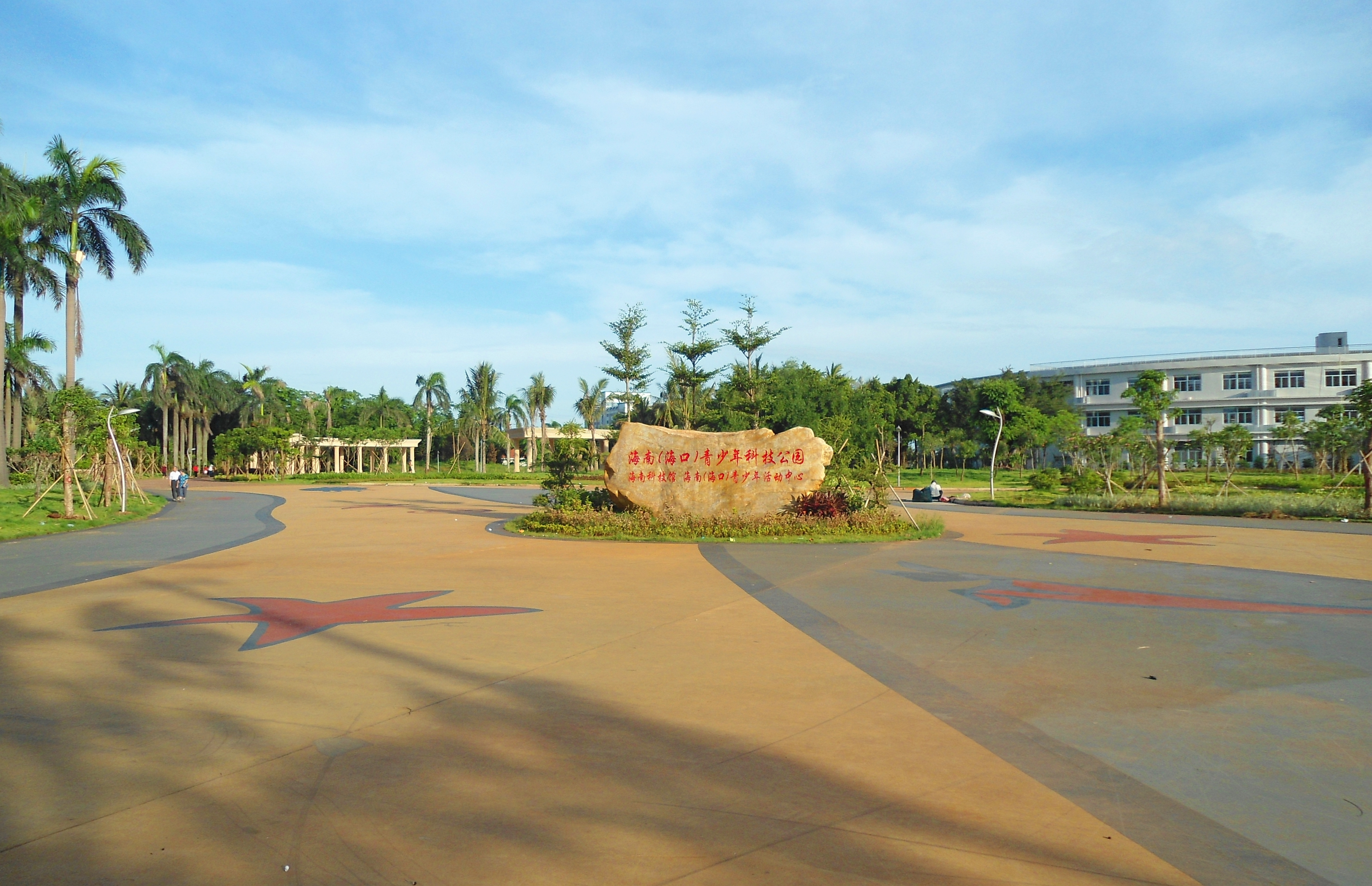
Binhai Park front entrance in June 2012. The stone marker displays the name "Hainan (Haikou) Youth Technology Park" as it was then named.

Around 2005 and earlier, the site was an increasingly dilapidated and disused amusement park containing a few rides and mostly green areas. During the years just prior to 2010, it was renovated and named Hainan (Haikou) Youth Technology Park. Around 2015 to 2016 it was renovated again to become Binhai Park.

== Description ==
Binhai Park is around 500 metres by 500 metres with the front entrance on Binhai road. It is situated directly east of the south end of Haikou Century Bridge. There is a small lake in the centre of the park with a community centre and building and courtyard at the east shore. The park contains numerous paths and a small hill. During the final renovation, the park incorporated an area of forest at the southwest corner. This previously unmaintained area was cleaned up and had brick paths and lighting installed. However, since 2018, that corner has fallen into disrepair.

In 2018, the Haikou Citizen Tourism Center was built by the northwest shore of the lake. It is the largest building with wooden roof in China.

== Usage ==
Apart from being a visitor attraction for tourists, the park is used by local residents. In 2016, the Binhai Park was used for a major Bougainvillea hybrid exhibition. At that time, many other species of flowers were also planted throughout the park.

== Gallery ==
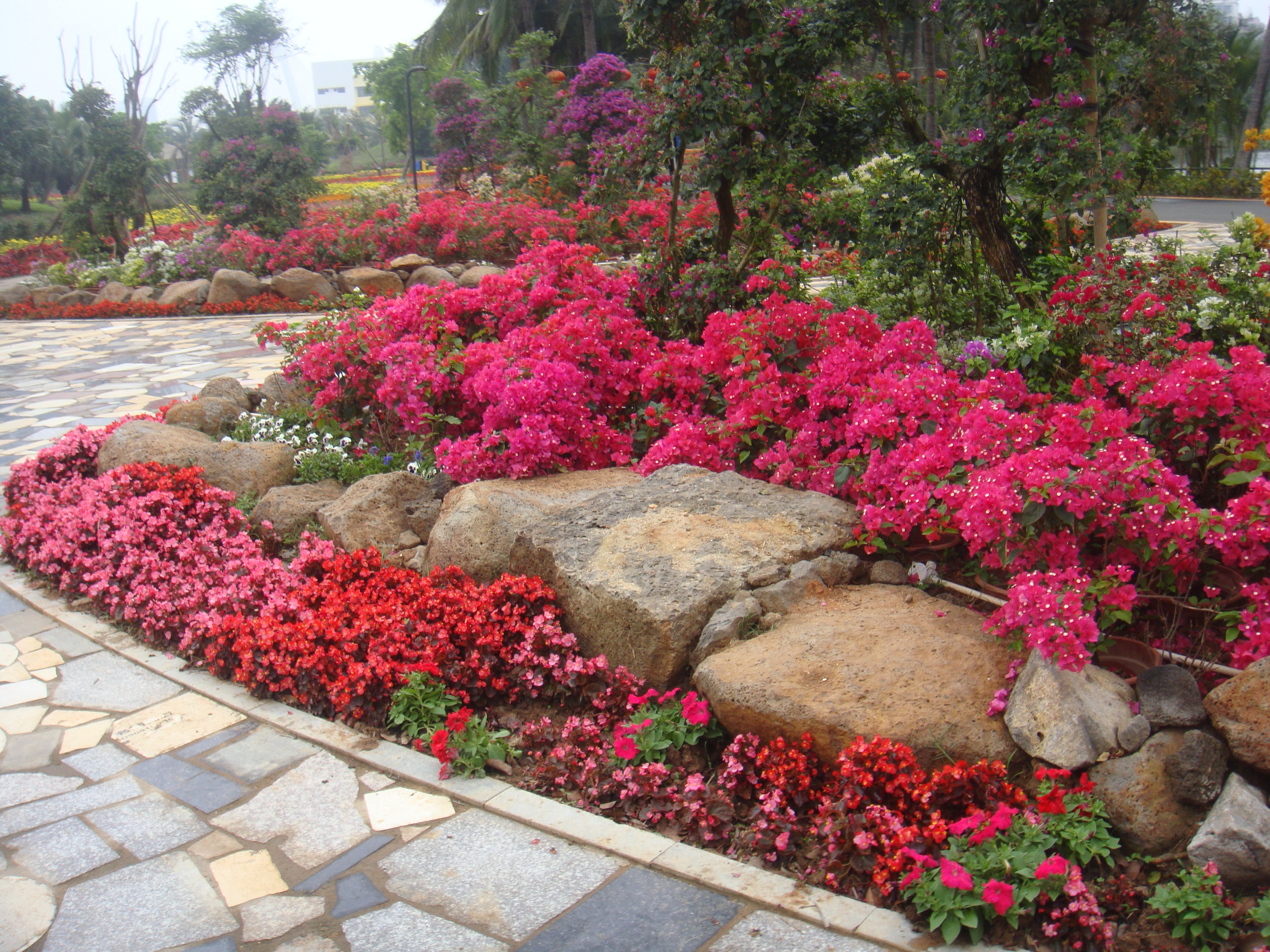
Bougainvillea hybrids during the 2016 exhibition

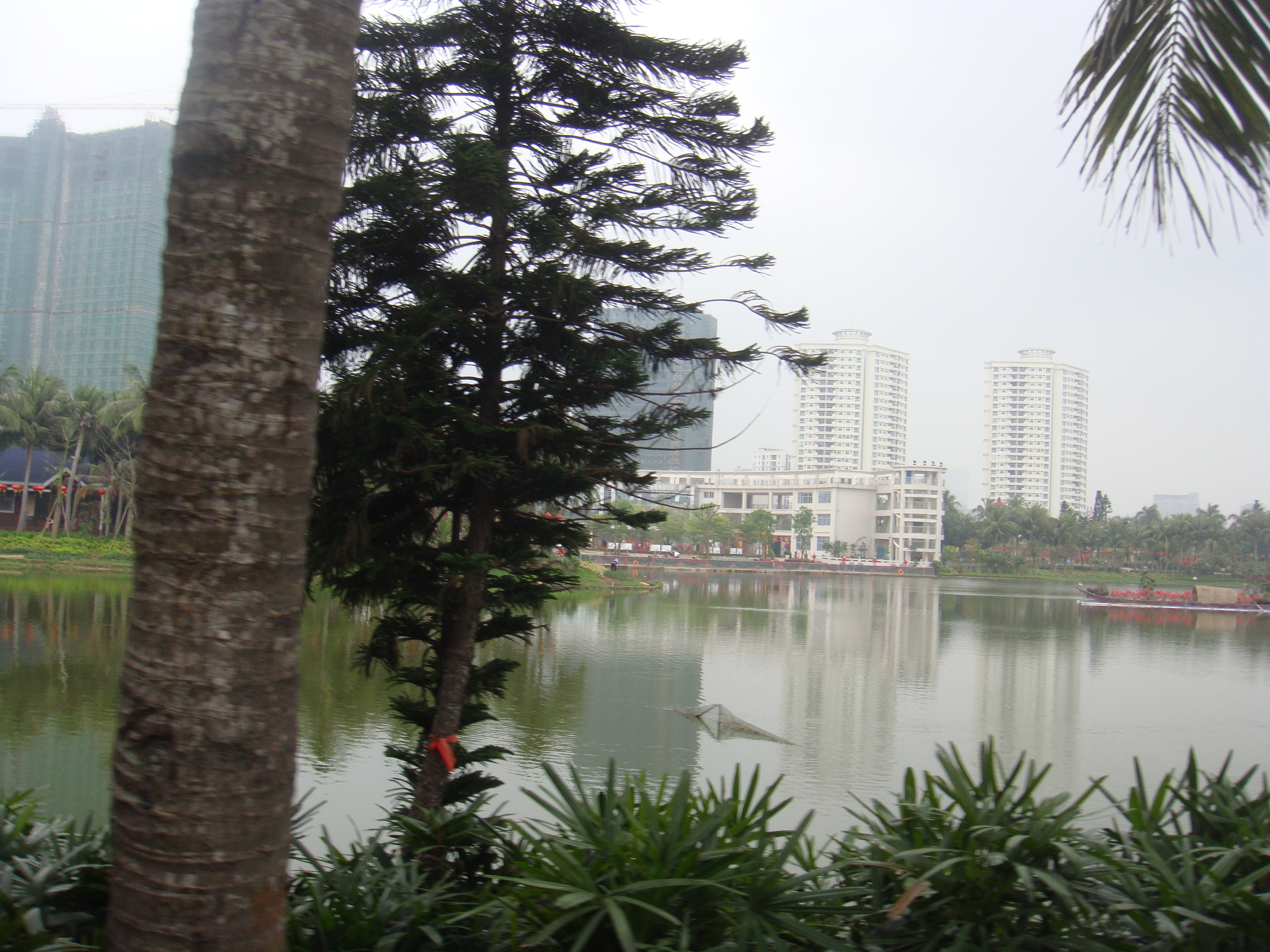
The lake

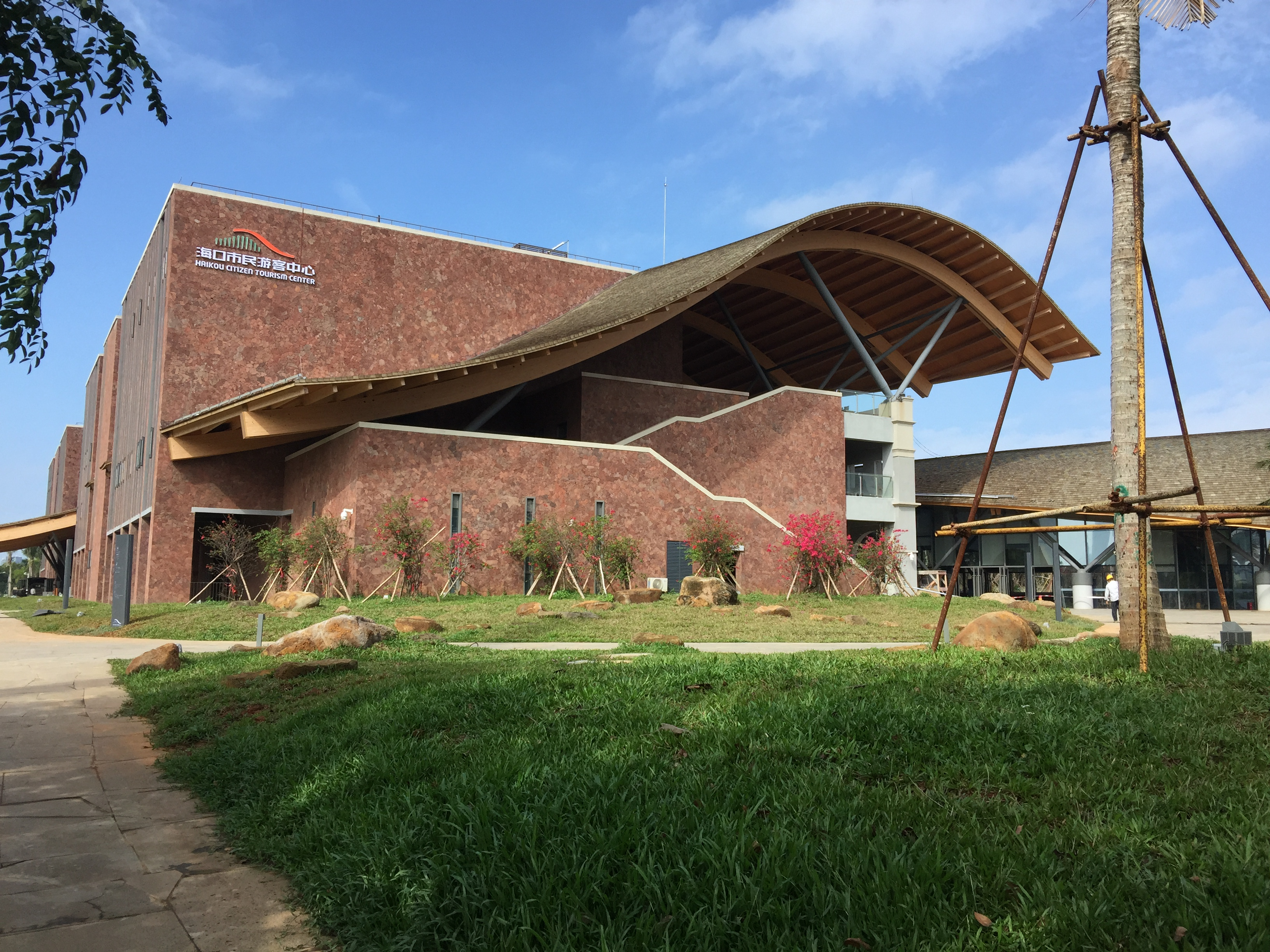
Haikou Citizen Tourism Center
