= Central City, Ohio =

Ghost town in Ohio, United States

Coordinates: 40°02′03″N 82°28′13″W

Central City is a ghost town in Licking County, in the U.S. state of Ohio. It was located on the intersection of the Toledo and Ohio Central Railway and the Central Ohio Railroad at the northern edge of what's now the city of Heath.

== History ==
Central City was a station on the Baltimore and Ohio Railroad.
