= First hundred days =

First hundred days (alternatively written first 100 days) often refers to the beginning of a leading politician's term in office, and may refer to:

- First hundred days, the concept about the first 100 days of a presidency
  - First 100 days of Franklin D. Roosevelt's presidency
  - First 100 days of the Obama presidency
  - First 100 days of the first Trump presidency
  - First 100 days of the Biden presidency
  - First 100 days of the second Trump presidency
  - First 100 days of the Duterte presidency
  - First 100 days of Imran Khan's premiership

== Other uses ==
- UKIP: The First 100 Days, a 2015 British mockumentary
- The Story with Martha MacCallum, an American cable news show which premiered as The First 100 Days

== See also ==
- Hundred Days (disambiguation)
