= Central City FC =

The Central City Football Club is an association football club based in Melbourne's city centre, Victoria, Australia.

Representing the Central Zone in the Victorian Champions League, as one of twelve teams competing, Central City were one of the strongest teams in the competition during the 2008/09 season.

Central City's home ground is Bob Jane Stadium. The club kit supplier is Legea, and their colours are blue and black.
