= Century Tower =

Century Tower may refer to:

- Century Tower (Beaumont) in Beaumont, Texas, U.S.
- Century Tower (Chicago) in Chicago, Illinois, U.S.
- Century Tower (Sydney) in Sydney, New South Wales, Australia
- Century Tower (University of Florida) in Gainesville, Florida, U.S
- Century Tower (Tokyo) in Bunkyo, Tokyo, Japan

== See also ==
- The Century Towers, in Century City, Los Angeles, U.S
