= The Century (newspaper) =

Centuries Counterfeit

The Century was a weekly newspaper published by Nellis Air Force Base in Las Vegas, from 1960 to 1980. Many members of the editorial staff went on to work at newspapers and media outlets across the country. The Arizona Republic, KSHO TV-13 ABC Las Vegas, Las Vegas Review-Journal, and many others.

The writers were a gifted group representing a cross section of enlisted personnel and officers. The paper won many awards including several prestigious US Air Force awards for its reporting of the U.S. Air Force Thunderbirds, which were based at Nellis.
