= Century (novel) =

1981 novel by Fred Mustard Stewart

- First edition
- Author: Fred Mustard Stewart
- Language: English
- Genre: Novel
- Publisher: William Morrow and Company
- Publication date: 1981
- Publication place: United States
- Media type: Print (hardback & paperback)
- Pages: 546 p. (paperback edition)
- ISBN: 0-451-11407-8 (paperback edition)
- OCLC: 8178036

Century is a 1981 novel by Fred Mustard Stewart, first published by William Morrow and Company. The story follows four generations of an Italian-American family with settings in both America and Italy. Most of the events that take place in the novel, take place in actual American and Italian history. Readers are witnesses to the rise of Benito Mussolini, the Prohibition period, Black Tuesday, World War I, World War II, the attack on Pearl Harbor, the Holocaust, and the gradual formation of the motion picture industry in Hollywood. The novel spent six weeks on The New York Times Best Seller list.

== Plot summary ==
=== Introduction ===
Seven-year-old Princess Syliva Maria Pia Angelica Toscanelli is called to the Mother Superior's office. She is told that her father, Prince Filiberto was killed in battle, making the princess an orphan.

Private Augustus Dexter is on his way back from Savannah, Georgia, after delivering confidential papers from General Sherman when he decides to spend the night at a burned plantation house, in order to rest and loot the house. An old slave, offers him his mistress's jewels for fifty dollars. Augustus gives him thirty dollars and his father's gold watch. He plans to sell the jewellery and use them to fund his plans of building a bank in New York.

=== Part I: Franco and Vittorio (1880) ===
Alice Dexter, the wife of Augustus, is vacationing in the Villa dell'Acqua after having struck up a friendship with Princess Sylvia. She meets Vittorio Spada, a servant child, with whom she takes a great liking to.

Franco Spada, the older brother of Vittorio, and the gardener of the villa, bribes the local priest with a gold watch. Franco asks the priest to care for Vittorio, in the case of his death. The next morning, Princess Sylvia goes on her daily horse ride, when she encounters what appears to be an unconscious Franco. When she dismounts and attempts to wake him, Franco immediately holds her at gunpoint in the hopes of kidnapping her so that the royal family will give enough money to send him and Vittorio to America. Princess Sylvia laughs at him, and demands that he help her to mount her horse. Afterwards, she invites him to meet her at the library where she begins to teach him how to read and write. She is later warned by Alice of the suspicions that could possibly arise from her teaching Franco, particularly the suspicions of her husband. Princess Sylvia ignores it, and continues to teach him.

Prince Giancarlo returns home after a bomb scare. He meets with a Mafia member to arrange for Franco's removal from his wife's presence. One night Franco is awoken and arrested for the rape and murder of a local girl. He is later arraigned and given a life-sentence. Princess Sylvia makes it her life goal to fight for his release, knowing that Prince Giancarlo, was likely behind the arrest. She writes to Alice explaining her woes and the fear for Vittorio's future.

Alice, who is unable to produce children, decides to have Vittorio sent to America to become her son, against the wishes of Augustus.

Franco is later transferred to the island of San Stefano to live out the remainder of his life sentence with hard labor. He becomes chained to Fillipo Pieri with whom he immediately bonds to.

=== Part II: Love Affairs (1890–1892) ===
Vittorio is now known as Victor Dexter, the legally adopted son of Alice and Augustus Dexter. Augustus continues to treat him as a nuisance but slowly shows signs of warmth. He is called into Augustus's office to be pressured into attending the family Christmas party. Victor decides to ask Lucille Elliot, his cousin, but she is already attending with her boyfriend.

At the Christmas party, he dances enthusiastically with an unattractive girl, with whom he was tricked into dancing with by his cousin Rodney. Lucille takes notice and asks Victor to dance with her. Shortly after, a drunk Rodney and Lucille's boyfriend gang up on Victor leading to a public fight. Afterwards, Victor leaves and travels to Little Italy. A prostitute approaches him, and he decides to give in to his sexual urges for the first time.

The next day Victor returns home to inform Alice and Augustus that he is moving out, and living with an Italian family. He meets Gianni, the family's son, who asks him to teach him English. When Victor returns to work at the bank, Augustus calls him to his office, to question the loan application of an Italian grocer. Victor informs him that he recommended the grocer to apply at their bank. The two argue after Augustus chooses to reject it based on his racist hatred of Italians. After the argument, Augustus approves the loan. A celebration with the local Italians ensues, and Gianni asks Victor to accompany him to a "club". The club turns out to be a gang led by Little Vinnie. Victor rejects the invitation to join and leaves.

Alice is becoming weak due to tuberculosis. She celebrates her thirty-sixth birthday with her family. Victor meets up with Lucille and tells her that he loves her, and to marry him. She decides to date him. Upon their first date, he discovers that Howard Cantrell, the genial cashier of the bank is embezzling money. After confronting him, Howard runs and away and drowns himself. Augustus later praises Victor for his discovery, and finally attempts to connect with him.

On his way back home, Victor runs into Gianni, Little Vinnie and their friend Marco. The three are drunk and decide to teach him a lesson. An accident ensues in which Marco is killed. Little Vinnie assures Victor before they leave, that Marco's death will not be forgotten. Later, Victor moves back home with Alice and Augustus. He later confesses the accident to Augustus, who accepts it calmly but secretly harbors mixed feelings regarding Victor's true nature. Alice dies ten days later from her illness.

In Italy, Franco writes in his diary that Fillipo has died due to a heat stroke coupled with twelve years of backbreaking work. He plans to escape the prison and prepares to do so, only to find that the newly widowed Princess Sylvia has managed to have him pardoned by the King, and released.

She brings him back to the villa where he cleans and is offered the services of a prostitute. However, Franco rejects her, and confesses his love for the princess, who has secretly harbored feelings for Franco as well. The two becomes lovers, and he decides with her support to create a socialist newspaper, which eventually becomes successful.

=== Part III: Years of Gold (1903–1910) ===
The eleven years after Alice's death, were happy ones for Victor. He married Lucille and fathered three children with her. Also during that period, he and Augustus shared a greater relationship, before Augustus's death from a cerebral hemorrhage. Three days after Augustus's funeral, the will was read. Victor learned that he had been left a large amount of money. Yet, the controlling shares of the Dexter Bank were left to Lucille. Eventually, Victor came to understand that it was Augustus's way of conveying to Victor, that he did not completely trust him, after the night he learned that Victor killed a man.

With Victor as the new president of the Dexter Bank, he immediately initiates great changes by reaching out to new classes of depositors – primarily the urban poor and immigrants. Little Vinnie learns of this change, and meets up with Victor at the bank to blackmail him into giving him a hundred thousand dollar loan. Victor fears that Little Vinnie will tell the media about Marco's death. He arranges to speak with the uncle of Julia Lombardini, his new secretary, due to his insights on Little Vinnie's criminal activities. Later, Little Vinnie and Gianni are arrested on charges of robbery. The two had been manipulated into committing a crime that Victor and an undercover police officer had planned.

Lucille decides to use some of the income from the bank stock to build a mansion for the family. She hires Archie Winstead, an architect, to aid in the design and construction. Victor worries that she will drive the bank into bankruptcy with her spending. Tensions arise when she informs Victor that he can do nothing to stop her plans for the building, nor her plans for moving upwards in the social hierarchy. Eventually, Victor asks Lucille to sell him her stock. She refuses, because she enjoys the new power that she holds over him. On the day that Victor receives news of Little Vinnie's arrest, Lucille asks him to make love to her. He rejects her, making her realize that her once compliant husband is rebelling.

During Christmas, Lucille is in London buying furniture for their home. Victor is invited to Julia's home to spend Christmas with her family. After dinner he and Julia walk along the beach, when he confesses that he is falling in love with her. She accepts his kiss before pushing him away and insisting that she be his secretary, rather than his mistress. Back at Julia's home, Victor asks her uncle who owns a local Italian newspaper for help in forcing Lucille to sell her stock. With the newspaper, they ask the Italian community to deposit their money into the Dexter Bank. Lucille returns home ecstatic with the deposits and increases in stock. She buys a new dress, only to discover that the new Italian depositors, are withdrawing their money. Lucille quickly realizes that Victor had planned the sudden deposits to force her to sell. They argue with Victor telling her that she has forced him into doing this for fear that she will sell the stock out of the family in order to climb the social ladder. She cries and asks Victor if he loves her. He admits that he does not know anymore. Afterwards, she tells him that she will sell the stock to him, leaving Victor to realize by doing so it may have cost him his marriage.

Meanwhile, in Italy Franco is now a senator and living with Princess Sylvia and their twin sons. He uses his position to pressure the senate into launching a crusade against the Mafia. Sylvia worries for his safety and asks that he hire a bodyguard. Their son Tony, is under the tutelage of Cardinal dell'Acqua, in hopes of becoming a priest. The Cardinal presses Tony to encourage his parents to solidify their marriage by marrying. Despite Franco's continuous attack on the Church, the couple agree. Later, Tony's brother Fausto pressures him into coming along to La Rosina, the local brothel. Although Tony is initially resistant he agrees. He sleep with a woman for the first time. Later, he angrily admits to Fausto that he enjoyed it. The next day he informs his mother that he is going to be a priest.

Back in America, Julia is now Victor's mistress despite her desire to be anything but. She argues with him to divorce Lucille. Victor continually insists that the timing is wrong despite his desire to be with her as well. Eventually, Victor and his family are aboard a ship to Italy where they have been invited to attend Franco and Sylvia's wedding. It will be the first time Victor has returned to Italy in thirty years. Yet, he cannot be happy while Julia is upset at him. That night, Victor and Lucille engage in an argument before Victor asks her for a divorce. She refuses and informs him that he is not rich enough for her to divorce him yet. On the third day of traveling, they reach Rome where Victor tearfully reunites with Franco. The two converse that night with Franco telling Victor, that it is apparent he is unhappily married. Franco and Sylvia are later married by Cardinal dell'Acqua where a grand celebration takes place afterwards.

When the Dexter family returns home, Julia meets with Victor and tells him that while he has been away, she has been dating a wine importer and accepted his proposal in spite of the fact that she does not love him. Victor tells Julia that he has tried to divorce Lucille, but she will not agree. Julia does not relent and admits that she has grown to despise being his mistress. They depart by thanking each other for the last six years shared together.

A week later Victor receives a cable from Sylvia informing him that Franco was run over by a car and killed. He retreats into a room to mourn his losses. In Rome, Fausto angrily tells his mother that his father's death was no accident. He is certain that the Mafia was involved. He promises to avenge his death.

=== Part IV: Over Here and Over There (1915–1917) ===
A woman named Elaine Fitzsimmons has approached Victor with the idea of writing a book about his life. He considers it, before inviting her to spend the weekend with his family at their weekend house on Sands Point. Before leaving the office, he meets with Morris David, a director, writer and producer of films. Morris asks Victor to aid him in financing his next film. Victor agrees under the condition of seeing Morris's other works. That night, he attends the movies and watches Morris's The Undressed Salad. He decides to finance it.

Drew Dexter and his friends steal a speedboat with the intentions of returning it. They are caught and end up in jail for the night. Victor decides to have him work with the Sand Point road crews in order to learn his lesson. In the meantime, Barbara Dexter meets Morris who has come into Sand Points attempting to meet with her father. They find themselves amused by the differences in their personalities as they ride back to her home. Before leaving he tells her to contact him if she finds any good books that could possibly be made into films.

Elaine has tea with Lucille who has been hiring her to seduce Victor. Lucille hopes that by entrapping Victor, she will receive a generous divorce settlement. However, Elaine finds herself turned off by Lucille's cold nature. She confides in Victor and the two become lovers. Unbeknownst to the two, Lucille is all too aware of their relationship and sends two photographers to their rooms. When he returns home, she triumphantly announces what she intends to reap from their divorce settlement. Before he leaves, she is startled to hear him say that he feels sorry for what he knows she will become. As he walks out she finds herself wishing he would come back.

In Italy, Lieutenant Fausto and his men are captured during the Battle of Caporetto. The German captain who has caught him allows him to escape home where Princess Sylvia has transformed the palazzo into a hospital for wounded soldiers. Fausto returns and takes note of a pretty nurse named Nanda Montecatini. He asks his mother to introduce them. Yet, Fausto is not the only one to notice Nanda. Tony struggles with his role as a priest and his strong desires for Nanda. During Fausot's first date with Nanda, he mistakenly falls prey to the rumor that all Jewish girls are easy. He attempts to force Nanda to sleep with him. She knees him in the groin. He apologizes and the two agree to see each other later. Meanwhile, Tony confesses to Cardinal dell'Acqua his lustful thoughts of Nanda. Cardinal dell'Acqua insists that Tony must purge himself of such thoughts.

Later, Fausto is traveling a taxi to rejoin his commanding officer. They are forced to stop due to a crow of people gathered around Benito Mussolini. He steps outside and finds himself entranced by the speaker.

=== Part V: The Filming of Russia (1920) ===
Morris David and Barbara Dexter are now married and living in Hollywood, where David has become a successful comedic film producer. They hold a great celebration filled with various Hollywood celebrities for their open house. Also in attendance, is the newly married Lucille, her young husband Archibald Pembroke and Lorna Dexter. During the party, Morris makes an announcement that he intends to create Russia, the most expensive dramatic film of its time, in order to document the suffering of the Russian Jews. While at the party Lorna meets Carl Maria von Gersdorff, a concert pianist. Though engaged, she finds herself attracted to him.

While filming Russia, numerous difficulties, accidents and upsets cause the film to be delayed and even more costly. Barbara decides to fund the film so long as Morris changes the genre to comedy, which he ultimately agrees to after realizing that all of the accidents and dramatic effects have essentially created a comedy.

Back in New York, Lorna visits Victor to inform him that she is marrying Carl. Although happy for her, Victor feels even lonelier knowing that his last daughter is now leaving him.

On the night of the premiere of Russia, Morris and Barbara return home. The film is well received by fans and critics alike. However, as Morris professes his love for Barbara's faith in him, she slaps him. Morris eventually learns that Barbara had discovered that he had been sleeping with Laura Kaye, the female lead in the film. Soon after, Morris manages to charm Barbara into forgiving him.

A week after the premiere, Lorna marries Carl. Eight months later they have a baby girl named Gabriella.
