= Century Theatre =

Century Theatre may refer to:

- Century Theatre (Buffalo, New York), U.S.
- Century Theatre (Detroit), U.S.
- Century Theatre (Central Park West), a demolished theater on the Upper West Side, Manhattan, New York, U.S.
- Century Theatre (Toronto), Canada, now Danforth Music Hall
- Century Theatre (mobile theatre), now at Snibston, Leicestershire, England
- Century Theatres, an American movie theatre chain
- Century Theatre, now Sony Hall, a former Broadway theater in the Theater District, Manhattan, New York, U.S.
- Century Theatre, now Village East by Angelika, a former off-Broadway theater in the East Village, Manhattan, New York, U.S.
- Century Theatre, another name for the Cort Theatre (San Francisco)

== See also ==
- New Century Theatre, a former Broadway theatre in Manhattan, New York City, U.S.
- The Schaefer Century Theatre, an American television anthology series
