= Central City, Houston =

Neighborhood in Houston, Texas

Central City is a neighborhood in Houston, Texas, United States.

In 2009, residents of Central City supported a bill by Garnet Coleman that would limit the ability of Texas Medical Center, Inc. (TMC, Inc.) to exercise its eminent domain rights on residential property. TMC, Inc. is not the same as the institutions comprising the Texas Medical Center; rather, TMC, Inc. owns and maintains parking garages and landscapes common areas in the medical center complex.
