= John Riddy =

British photographer (born 1959)

John Riddy (born 1959) is a British photographer who came to the fore after his solo exhibition at Camden Arts Centre in 2000. He lives and works in London and has exhibited internationally since 1998.

== Life and career ==
Riddy started taking and printing photographs at the age of 14 and earned a BA and MA in Fine Art at Chelsea School of Art (1980–84). Since his first solo exhibition in 1993 Riddy has consistently worked in series, with an emphasis on considered description. Architecture, the particularities of place and the urban environment have been constant subjects, whilst the starting point for many of his series has been the relationship between photography and the history of art and architecture. Typical examples are the autobiography of John Ruskin, the woodblock prints of Hokusai and the photographs of Gustave le Gray. Choices about format, materials and technique have been intrinsic to each series and Riddy’s focus has been on the exhibited print.

== Exhibitions ==
In 1993 Riddy had his first solo exhibition with the Cairn Gallery. Shortly afterwards he started working with Frith Street Gallery who continue to represent him. His first survey exhibition was at Camden Arts Centre in 2000 and he showed his series Views from Shin-Fuji at the Victoria and Albert Museum in 2006. He has exhibited regularly with Galerie Paul Andriesse in the Netherlands and Lawrence Markey in the USA. His exhibition Palermo at Frith Street gallery in 2013 was reviewed by theguardian.com and Aesthetica Magazine. Aesthetica described the photographs as "anything but spontaneous. Physical decay of the urban landscape is juxtaposed with a remarkable formal beauty just as, in a more conceptual sense, time and timelessness contend with each other in these works". Adrian Searle commented "If his photographs have anything to do with Cartier-Bresson's "decisive moment", it is a moment that has taken months and several visits to present itself. It is the moment when everything seems alive but precisely nothing is happening.".

=== Solo exhibitions ===
Riddy's solo exhibitions include Photographs, De Pont Museum of Contemporary Art, Tilburg, Half-light, Frith Street Gallery, London, 2018, Palermo, Frith Street Gallery, London, 2013, Low Relief - Photographs of London, Frith Street Gallery, London, 2009, Views from Shin-Fuji, Victoria and Albert Museum, London, 2006, John Riddy, Camden Arts Centre, 2000,John Riddy, De La Warr Pavilion, Bexhill-on-Sea, 2000 and Praeterita, touring exhibition, Ruskin Gallery, Sheffield, Brantwood, Coniston, Ruskin Library, Lancaster, 2000.

=== Group exhibitions ===
Recent group exhibitions featuring Riddy's work include Beyond Documentary, Museum of London, London (2018), Summer Breeze: An Ensemble of Gallery Artists, Frith Street Gallery, London (2017), A Certain Kind of Light, Towner Art Gallery, Eastbourne (2017), Selected Works (Riddy, Frecon, Bishop and Zurier), Lawrence Markey, San Antonio, TX (2015) 40 Years – 40 Artists, UMCA University of Massachusetts Amherst, MA (2015), Ruin Lust, Tate Britain, London (2014), Silver, Frith Street Gallery, London (2014), Revealed: Government Art Collection, Whitechapel Gallery, London (2011) and Romantics, Tate Britain, London (2010), among others.

== Collections ==
- Southampton City Art Gallery, Hampshire
- Tate, London
- Victoria and Albert Museum, London
- De Pont Museum of Contemporary Art, Tilburg
- Stedelijk Museum, Amsterdam
- Arts Council of Great Britain, London
- British Council Collection
- Government Art Collection UK
- Museum of London
- Margulies Collection
- BBC Collection, London
- Hiscox Collection
- Goldman Sachs International

== Publications ==
- John Riddy: Photographs (2019), essay by Michael Fried and conversation with James Welling, edited by Liz Jobey, Göttingen: Steidl, ISBN 978-3-95829-566-7
- John Riddy: Views from Shin-Fuji (2013), published by Frith Street Books, London ISBN 978-0-9567757-0-2
- John Riddy: Palermo (2013), published by Frith Street Books, London ISBN 978-0-9567757-1-9
- John Riddy – 8 Skies (2004), published by Frith Street Gallery and Paul Andriesse ISBN 90-73215-12-9
- John Riddy (2000), published by Camden Arts Centre in association with the de la Warr Pavilion ISBN 978-1900470124
- John Riddy: Praeterita (2000), published by the Ruskin School of Drawing ISBN 978-0953852505
- Rome, published by Lawrence Markey Gallery, New York, 1999

=== Other critical writings ===
- John Riddy: Palermo, London | Aesthetica Magazine
- James Castle/ John Riddy | Frieze
- John Riddy: Photographs, De Pont | nrc.nl (dutch)
- Rachel Withers, Art Forum, June 2009
- Rebecca Geldard, Time Out Exhibition of the Week, March 2009
