= The Century (Los Angeles) =

42-story condominium skyscraper in Century City, California

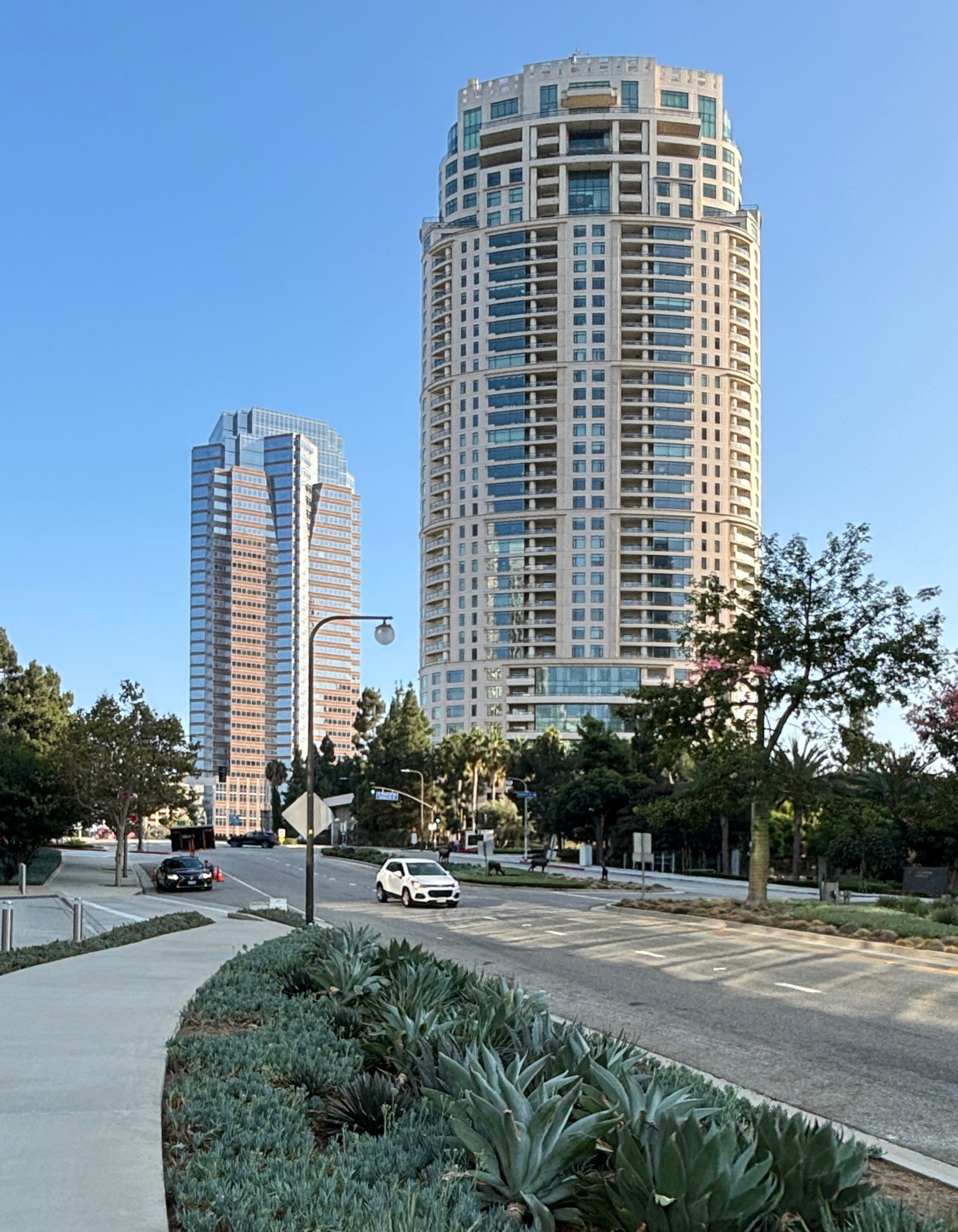
- The Century in September 2024
- Interactive map of the The Century area

General information
- Status: Completed
- Type: Residential
- Architectural style: postmodern
- Location: 1 West Century Drive; Los Angeles, California
- Coordinates: 34.05630°N 118.4144°W
- Construction started: 2007
- Completed: 2009
- Opening: 2010

Height
- Roof: 146.5 m (481 ft)

Technical details
- Floor count: 42
- Floor area: 50,167 m^{2} (539,990 sq ft)
- Lifts/elevators: 5

Design and construction
- Architects: Robert A.M. Stern Architects; HKS Architects
- Developer: Related Companies
- Structural engineer: Magnusson Klemencic Associates
- Main contractor: Webcor Builders

Other information
- Number of units: 140

The Century is a 42-story, 146.5 m (481 ft) condominium skyscraper in Century City, California. Completed in late 2009, the building has 42 floors and rises to a height of 481 feet, making it the 41st-tallest building in Los Angeles. The 140 unit building was designed by the firm of the 2011 Driehaus Prize winner, Robert A.M. Stern Architects.

== History ==
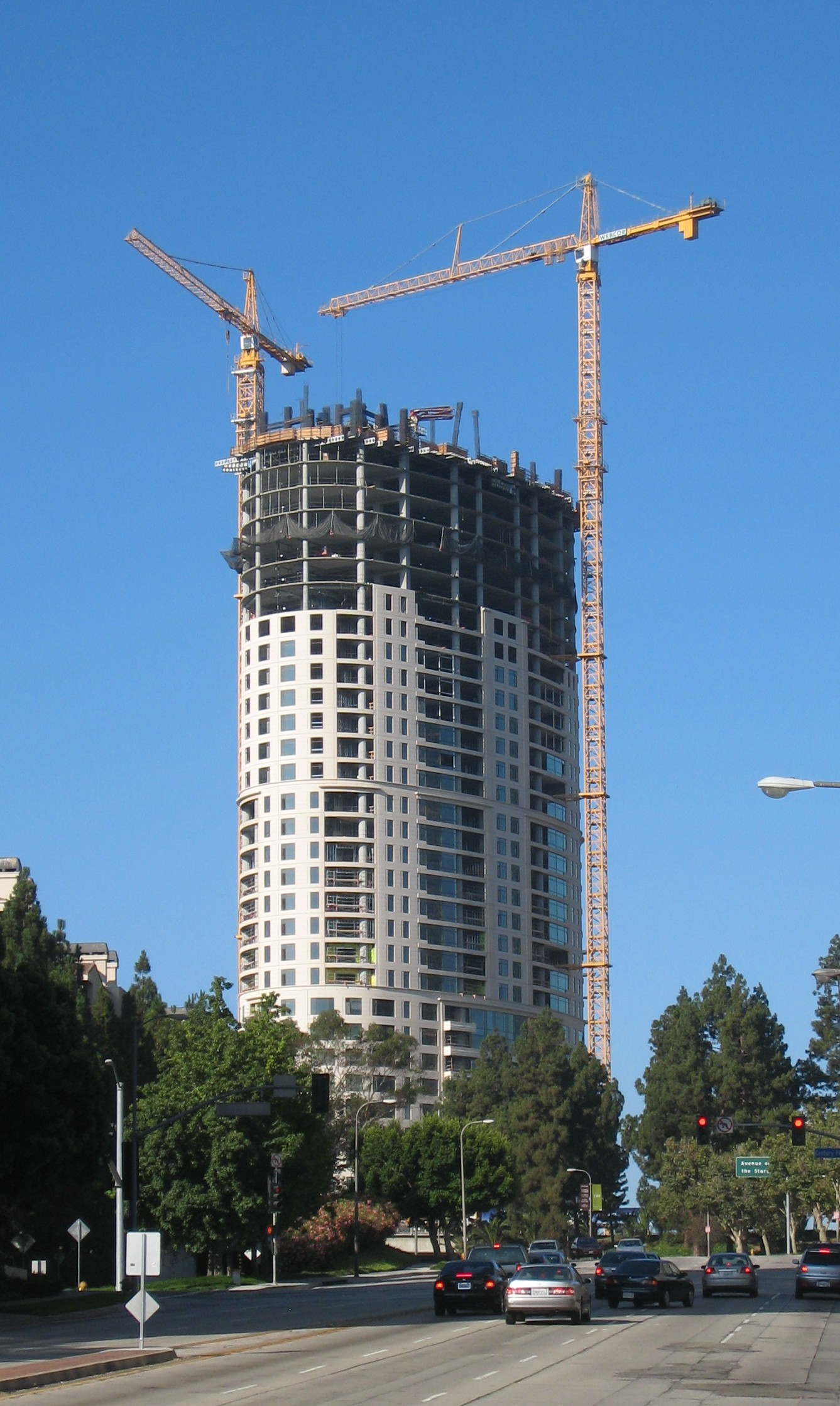
Construction in August 2008

The Century was developed by Related Companies, and constructed on the site of the former St. Regis Los Angeles, formerly part of the Century Plaza Hotel.

On July 22, 2008 Candy Spelling, the widow of late television producer Aaron Spelling, purchased the penthouse occupying the top two floors of the building. The residence, which is approximately 16,500 sq ft (1,530 m^{2}), set a price-per-square-foot record for a Los Angeles condominium residence. She later filed a lawsuit against the building developers for taking too long to build it.

Found two stories below Spellings’ unit, a full-floor penthouse with 9,343 sq ft (868.0 m^{2}) of living space sold for a record $22.5 million in 2015.

The least expensive unit sold at The Century was $1,800,000 for a 1-bedroom residence whilst the most expensive was $47,000,000.

== Notable residents ==
- Rihanna
- Matthew Perry
- Candy Spelling
- Paula Abdul
- Elizabeth Berkley
- Dorothy Wang
- Nobu Matsuhisa
- Heather Dubrow
- Terry Dubrow
- Denzel Washington

== See also ==
- List of tallest buildings in Los Angeles
