= Century (1999 book) =

Photographic history of the 20th century

Century is a 1999 coffee table book published by Phaidon Press that is equal parts photography and history. In the words of the author, Century is "an attempt to outline the history of the twentieth century as the camera has seen it."

The book was both conceived and edited by Bruce Bernard (1928–2000), a picture editor for The Sunday Times Magazine and a number of books on art and photography, including Photodiscovery. He curated 100 Photographs at the Victoria and Albert Museum. A book of which was published by Phaidon. An expanded edition was made after Bernard's death, showing pictures from 1999 to 2001
