= Century House (publisher) =

Century House was an American publisher located in Watkins Glen, New York. It was established in 1942 and specialized in publications on American culture and history. The company published several academic reference works on American music and art. The company also published numerous books on American antiques and other Americana collectibles. The publishing company was established by husband and wife Larry Freeman (1904–1995) and Ruth Freeman (1907–2000), both of whom had careers in academics. Dr. Graydon Laverne “Larry” Freeman, Ph.D. was a psychologist who taught on the faculties of Northwestern University and Cornell University. The publisher was still listed as active as late as 1992 in R.R. Bowker's Publishers, Distributors & Wholesalers of the United States.

The Freemans also used their Century House company as the managing organization for a museum, Old Irelandville in Watkins Glen. In the 1930s the couple purchased a historic farm house built by Charles Potter. They then purchased more historic buildings, some of them from other locations, which were then moved to their property to create a historic village. These included a tavern dating to 1797 and a manor house dating to 1833. The museum opened shortly after the end of World War II in the late 1940s and was still in operation as late as 1972. Lack of funds caused the museum to cease operation.
