= Crucifixion (Francis Bacon) =

Crucifixion by Francis Bacon may refer to:

- Crucifixion (Francis Bacon, 1933)
- Crucifixion (Francis Bacon, 1965)

== See also ==
- Fragment of a Crucifixion, 1950
- Three Studies for Figures at the Base of a Crucifixion, 1944
- Three Studies for a Crucifixion, 1962
