= Three Studies for a Crucifixion =

Painting by Francis Bacon

Francis Bacon, Three Studies for a Crucifixion, 1962, Guggenheim Museum in New York

Three Studies for a Crucifixion is a 1962 triptych oil painting by Francis Bacon. It was completed in March 1962 and comprises three separate canvases, each measuring 198.1 by 144.8 centimetres (6 ft 6.0 in × 4 ft 9.0 in). The work is held by the Solomon R. Guggenheim Museum in New York.

== Background ==
Bacon produced a number of works inspired by the Crucifixion since his early paintings Crucifixion and Crucifixion with Skull (both 1933). His Wound for a Crucifixion (also 1933) was exhibited in Bacon's first solo exhibition in February 1934, but he destroyed it following a series of negative reviews. His artistic reputation was grounded on his first large triptych, the 1944 masterpiece Three Studies for Figures at the Base of a Crucifixion, and he created his Fragment of a Crucifixion in 1950. He returned to the triptych format in 1962, with this painting, which is today seen as a marking point between his early and mature periods. He returned to the crucifixion two further times, with the Crucifixion in 1965, and the 1988 Second Version of Triptych 1944, a reworking of Three Studies for Figures at the Base of a Crucifixion. In Bacon's art, the crucifixion does not just refer to the death of Christ, but also to any image of corporeal suffering, pain, and mortification.

This work was created over a period of about two weeks, in preparation for his first retrospective at the Tate Gallery in London in 1962. Bacon created each canvas separately and then working on them as a group, often while very drunk or hungover. He later commented: "it's one of the only pictures that I've been able to do under drink. I think perhaps the drink helped me to be a bit freer". The work was one of 91 shown at the Tate that year, about half of Bacon's output at that time. It arrived at the gallery with the paint still wet.

== Description ==
The triptych is monumental in scale, some 6½ feet tall and nearly 15 feet long, twice the dimensions (four times the area) of the 1944 work, with its human figures depicted near life size. It deliberately associated animal slaughter with the crucifixion. In medieval triptychs, the panels were usually intended to be read in chronological sequence; with Christ carrying the cross in the left panel, the Crucifixion in the central panel, and the descent from the cross to the right; or as three parts of a scene from the same location; Christ on the cross flanked by two crucified criminals. However, Bacon often intends his triptych works to be read as three separate scenes, not linked by temporal or spatial continuity. In this work, the subjects of the three separate canvases do not seem to interact or interrelate, but they are shown with similar simple backgrounds: an orange floor joining a curved red wall which is pierced by black openings.

Here, the left panel appears to show two figures in a butcher's shop with joints of meat on the counter. The centre panel is occupied by a bloodied human body writhing on a bed, with a white dot on the foot possibly a nail scar. The crucifixion is moved from its traditional place in the centre panel to the third panel, where a figure reimagined as a gutted carcass that is sliding down a cross in the right panel; its contorted form is a reference (but inverted) to Christ's body in Cimabue's 13th-century Crucifix and is also influenced by Rembrandt's Side of Beef.

Bacon later commented, "one has got to remember as a painter that there is this great beauty of the colour of meat … we are meat, we are potential carcasses". Michael Peppiatt's alternative interpretation is that Bacon's vehement denial of any auto-biographical story in this work as an indication of quite the opposite; Peppiatt suggests the three panels relate to Bacon leaving home, an unsatisfactory sexual experiences in Berlin, and the death of Bacon himself.

== See also ==
- Triptychs by Francis Bacon
- List of paintings by Francis Bacon
