= Blood on the Floor (painting) =

1986 painting by Francis Bacon

Blood on the Floor (Painting, 1986), 1986. Oil on canvas, 198 cm x 147.5 cm. Private collection, Melbourne, Australia

Blood on the Floor (Painting, 1986) is a 1986 oil-on-canvas panel painting by the British artist Francis Bacon. The panel shows a violent splash of blood, formed from drips of paint, on a bare canvas-coloured floor, which may be a wooden plank or diving board, against a harsh, flat, orange background. The foreground contains two suspended light bulbs, one white, one molten yellow, and a light switch.

Painting, 1986 is considered a high point of Bacon's late period and reflective of his deepening pessimism later in life, expressed through the austere, thin brushwork; the panel has been described as "strikingly simple". It is related to his Blood on Pavement 1988, completed two years later in much cooler brown and pale green tones.

== Description ==
The large scale of the painting emphasises the pool of blood and gives it prime importance in the work. The light switch and bulbs serve only to illuminate the splash, but notably absent from the scene is the owner of the blood or any explanation as to how it got to be there. According to Joseph Harris, the blood itself becomes the subject of a portrait.

The painting is extremely reductive. Any sense of perspective is diminished. There are few elements to give the impression of a realistic three-dimensional space; the hanging lights excepted, but even their positioning is illogical against the floor; their starting point is deep in the pictorial space, but the bulbs seem to overhang in front of the floor. According to art critic Denis Farr, this deductive flat quality "increases one's sense of disorientation". Its intensity and narrowness of focus is reminiscent of monumental sculpture and imparts an immediate shock, along with deeper undercurrents of foreboding and despair.

== Motifs ==
Many of Bacon's most regarded late works are re-examinations of motifs from his earlier masterpieces. The background colours of Blood on the Floor reference the heavy and thickly painted foreground figures of his early to mid-40s works, notably Three Studies for Figures at the Base of a Crucifixion, while the mix of deep red colours forming the blood splash returns to his early use of imagery from medical textbooks, especially his interest in interiors of the mouth.

Light bulbs were a reoccurring motif throughout his career, appearing most notably in the centre panel of Triptych, May–June 1973.

Of the painting, Bacon said, "things are not as shocking if they have not been put into memorable form. Otherwise, it's just spattered against a wall. In the end, if you see that more than two or three times, it's no longer shocking. It must be of a form that's more than just blood splattered against a wall. It's when it has much wider implications. It's something that reverberates within your psyche...it disturbs the whole atmosphere in which you live. Most of what is called art, your eye just flows over. It may be charming or nice, but it doesn't change you."

== See also ==
- List of paintings by Francis Bacon

== Sources ==
- Farr, Dennis; Peppiatt, Michael; Yard, Sally. Francis Bacon: A Retrospective. NY: Harry N Abrams, 1999. ISBN 978-0-8109-2925-8
- Harris, Joseph. Verlag Peter Lang, 20014. ISBN 978-3-0391-0163-4
- Peppiatt, Michael. Anatomy of an Enigma. Westview Press, 1996. ISBN 978-0-8133-3520-9
- Schmied, Wieland. Francis Bacon: Commitment and Conflict. Munich: Prestel, 1996. ISBN 978-3-7913-1664-2
