= Blood on the Floor =

Blood on the Floor may refer to:

- Blood on the Floor (painting), a 1986 painting by Francis Bacon
- Blood on the Floor (Turnage), a 1996 orchestral work by Mark-Anthony Turnage
