= Crucifixion (Francis Bacon, 1965) =

1965 painting by Francis Bacon

Crucifixion, 1965. 197.5cm x 147cm. Bayerische Staatsgemäldesammlungen, Munich

Crucifixion is a 1965 triptych painted by the Irish-born artist Francis Bacon. Across each of the three panels, the work shows three forms of violent death.

This triptych was the third such which Bacon painted relating to the Crucifixion, and follows 1944's Three Studies for Figures at the Base of a Crucifixion, and the Three Studies for a Crucifixion of 1962. For Bacon, images of the crucifixion were "a magnificent armature on which you can [work] about your own feelings and sensations ... You are working on all sorts of very private feelings about behaviour and the way life is".

The 1965 work closely follows the 1962 triptych in mood, colour and form and continues the artist's preoccupation with the imagery of the slaughterhouse. However, whereas the earlier work had an urgency and sense of struggle, the 1965 crucifixion shows defeated and butchered figures splayed on beds and hanging upside down on hooks. In the left-hand panel, a human carcass is shown lying on the bed. The figure is covered in splintlike bandages which, according to the art critic Hugh Davies, suggest "the frilly parer collars used by butchers to dress up joints of meat".

In the central panel, a half-human, half-animal hybrid figure is hung upside down from an angled scaffold structure. On the right-hand canvas, two men are shown watching the scene. They have been described by Davies as possibly being intended as "tormentors, witnesses, or fellow victims".

Bacon told David Sylvester,

"I've always been very moved by pictures about slaughterhouses and meat, and to me that belong very much to the whole thing of the Crucifixion. There've been extraordinary photographs which have been done of animals just being taken up before they were slaughtered; and the smell of death. We don't know, of course, but it appears by these photographs that they're so aware of what is going to happen to them, they do everything to attempt to escape. I think these pictures were very much based on that kind of thing, which to me is very, very near this whole thing of the Crucifixion. I know for religious people, for Christians, the Crucifixion has a totally different significance. But as a non-believer, it was just an act of man's behaviour to another".

== See also ==
- Triptychs by Francis Bacon
- List of paintings by Francis Bacon

== Sources ==
- Davies, Hugh; Yard, Sally,. Francis Bacon. New York: Abbeville Press, 1986. ISBN 978-1558592452
- Zweite, Armin. The Violence of the Real. London: Thames and Hudson, 2000. ISBN 0-5000-9335-0
