= Fragment of a Crucifixion =

1950 painting by Francis Bacon

- Artist: Francis Bacon
- Year: 1950
- Type: Oil and cotton wool on canvas
- Dimensions: 140 cm × 108.5 cm (55 in × 42.7 in)
- Location: Stedelijk Van Abbemuseum; Eindhoven

Fragment of a Crucifixion is an unfinished 1950 painting by the Irish-born figurative painter Francis Bacon. It shows two animals engaged in an existential struggle; the upper figure, which may be a dog or a cat, crouches over a chimera and is at the point of kill. It stoops on the horizontal beam of a T-shaped structure, which may signify Christ's cross. The painting contains thinly sketched passerby figures, who appear as if oblivious to the central drama.

Typical of Bacon's work, the painting is drawn from a wide variety of sources, including the screaming mouth of the nurse in Sergei Eisenstein's 1925 film Battleship Potemkin and iconography from both the Crucifixion of Jesus and the descent from the cross. The chimaera's despair forms the centrepiece of the work; its agony can be compared to Bacon's later works focusing on the motif of an open mouth.

Although the title has religious connotations, Bacon's personal outlook was bleak; as an atheist, he did not believe in either divine intervention nor an afterlife. As such, the work seems to represent a nihilistic and hopeless view of the human condition. He later dismissed the painting, considering it too literal and explicit. He abandoned the theme of the crucifixion for the following 12 years, not returning to it until the more loosely based, but equally bleak, triptych Three Studies for a Crucifixion. The painting is housed in the Stedelijk Van Abbemuseum in Eindhoven, Netherlands.

== Description ==
The upper creature may be a dog or a cat. Blood pours out of its mouth onto the head and body of its prey, a chimaera rendered as owl-like with human facial characteristics. The prey unsuccessfully struggles to flee from its captor. The lower figure's human aspect is most notable in the details of its mouth and genitalia. Both figures are positioned in the centre foreground of the canvas, and are each mutilated and covered in blood, their physical discomfort contrasted against the flat, neutral background typical of Bacon's paintings. The figures exhibit many elements found in his early work, notably the expressive, broad strokes set against the tightness of the flat, nondescript background. The link with the biblical Crucifixion is made through the raised arms of the lower creature, and the T-shaped cross.

The canvas is almost entirely stripped of colour. The T-shaped cross is dark blue; the two figures are painted in a mixture of white and black hues, the white tones dominating. Over half of the work is unpainted, essentially bare canvas. According to the theologian and curator Friedhelm Mennekes, the viewer's attention is thus solely focused "on the figure in agony on the cross, or more precisely: on the mouth, gaping and distorted in its cry". The body of the chimera, or hybrid bird, is rendered with light paint, and from it hang narrow red streams of paint, indicating the drips and spatter of blood. Bacon uses pentimenti to emphasise the hopelessness of the animal's death throes.

The painting contains the same white angular rails as the midgrounds of his 1949 Head II, Head VI, and Study for Portrait of the same year. In this panel, the rails are positioned just below the area where the horizontal and vertical bars of the cross intersect. The rail begins with a diagonal line which intersects the chimaera at what appears to be the creature's shoulder. The horizontal angular geometrical shape is sketched in white and grey in the mid-ground, and represents an early form of a spatial device Bacon was to develop and perfect during the 1950s, when it effectively became a cage used to frame the anguished figures portrayed in Bacon's foregrounds. In the mid-ground, the artist has sketched a street scene, which features walking stick figures and cars. The pedestrians appear oblivious to the slaughter before them.

== Imagery and sources ==
The bleakness of the painting is informed by the artist's harsh nihilism and existentialist view of life. Bacon was raised as a Christian, but according to his friend and biographer Michael Peppiatt, when he found he could no longer believe, he was "extremely disappointed and furious, and anybody with a scrap of religious belief... he would go for them". Peppiatt observes Bacon that "if somebody has that intensity, it's almost a faith in and of itself".

The painting has been linked both thematically and in its formal construction to Bacon's 1956 work Owls, and to preparatory sketches only brought to the art market in the late 1990s. The art critic Armin Zweite traces the origin of the lower figure to a photograph of an owl that Bacon found in a book on birds in motion; Bacon has replaced the bird's beak with a wide open human mouth.

=== Open mouth ===
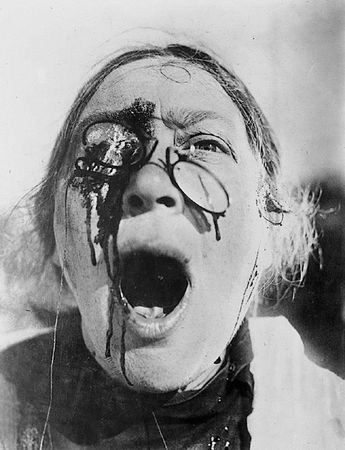
Still from Sergei Eisenstein's 1925 silent film Battleship Potemkin. Bacon called the image a catalyst for his work and incorporated the shape of the mouth when painting the chimaera.

Screaming mouths appear in many of Bacon's works from the late 1940s to the early 1950s. The motif was developed from sources including medical textbooks, and images of the nurse in the Odessa Steps sequence in Sergei Eisenstein's 1925 silent film Battleship Potemkin. Bacon kept a close-up still of the screaming nurse, at the moment when she has been shot in the eye. He referred to the still in paintings throughout his career.

Bacon tended to draw images in series, and the Odessa nurse became an obsessive motif for him. According to Peppiatt, "it would be no exaggeration to say that, if one could really explain the origins and implications of this scream, one would be far closer to understanding the whole art of Francis Bacon". Gilles Deleuze wrote that, in Bacon's screams, "the entire body escapes through the mouth".

=== Crucifixion ===
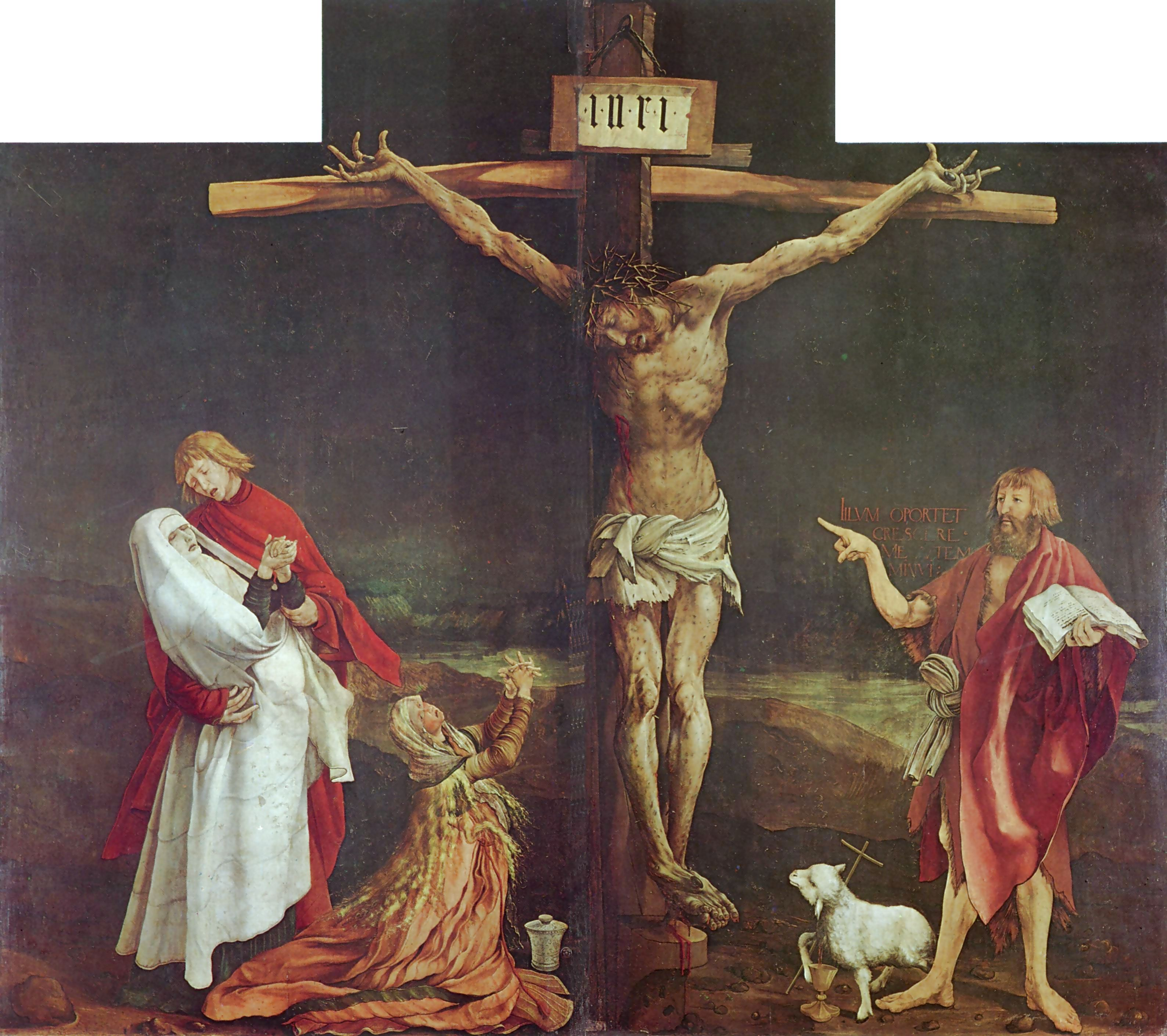
Matthias Grünewald, Isenheim Altarpiece (centre panel), c. 1512–16. Unterlinden Museum, Colmar, Alsace

The panel is one of several Bacon's treatments of the biblical crucifixion scene. He also incorporates Greek legend, notably the tale of Aeschylus and the Eumenides—or Furies—found in the Oresteia, suggested by the broad wings of the chimera. Bacon's imagery became less extreme and more imbued with pathos as he got older, and fewer of his canvases contain the sensational imagery that made him famous in the mid-1940s. He admitted that, "When I was younger, I needed extreme subject matter. Now I don't." According to John Russell, Bacon found it more effective to reflect violence in his brush strokes and colourisation, rather than "in the thing portrayed".

The title refers to Christian iconography of the Passion of Jesus. Crucifixion scenes appear from Bacon's earliest works, and appeared frequently throughout his career. Russell writes that, to Bacon, the crucifixion was a "generic name for an environment in which bodily harm is done to one or more persons and one or more other persons gather to watch".

The painting was commissioned by Eric Hall, Bacon's patron and, later, his lover, who in 1933 commissioned three crucifixion paintings. Bacon drew influence from the old masters Grünewald, Diego Velázquez and Rembrandt, as well as Picasso's late 1920s and early 1930s biomorphs. Bacon said that he thought of the crucifixion as a "magnificent armature on which you can hang all types of feeling and sensation".

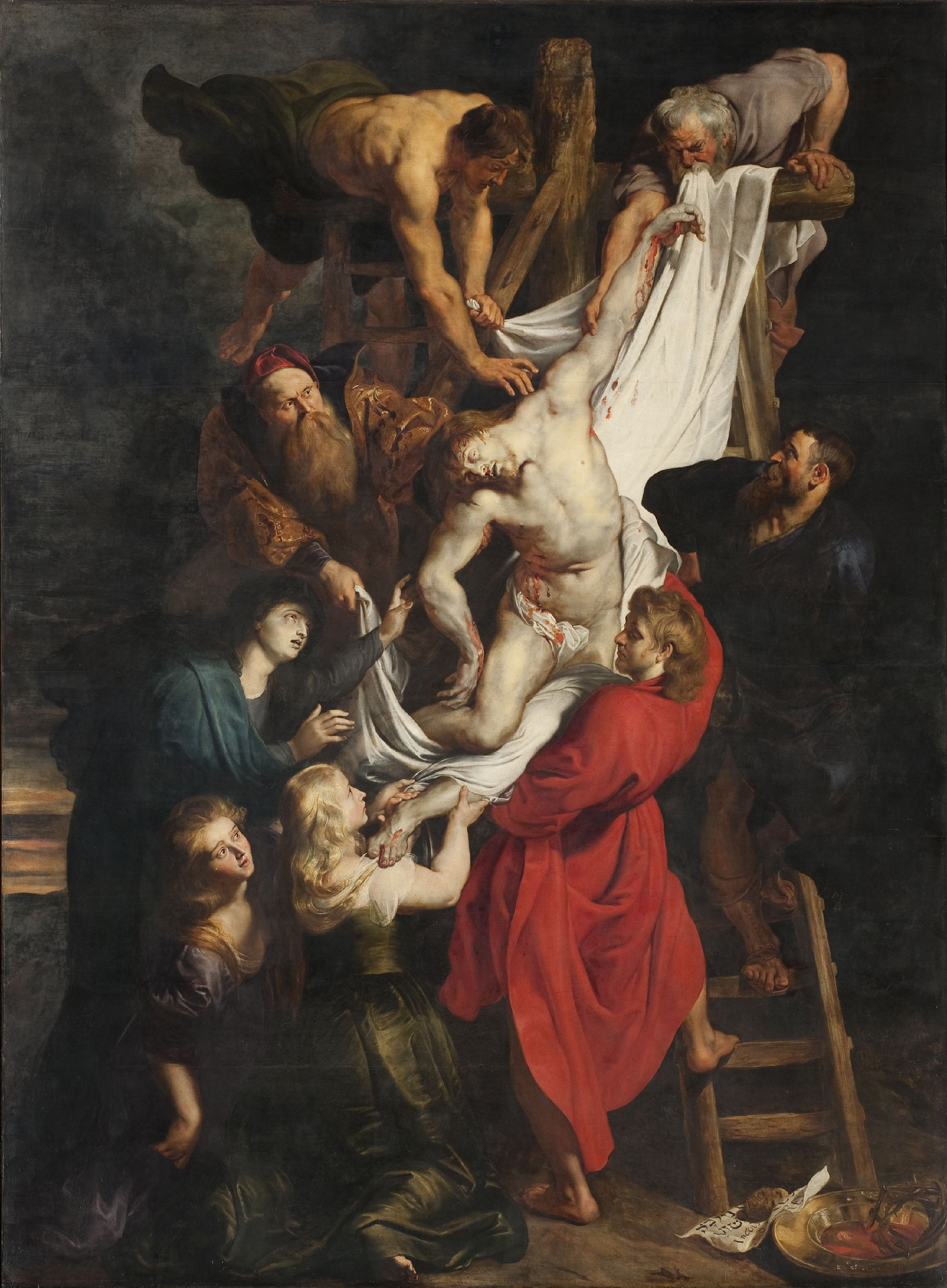
Peter Paul Rubens, Descent from the Cross (centre panel), 1612–1614

Elements of the canvas refer to Grünewald's c. 1512–16 Isenheim Altarpiece and Peter Paul Rubens's c. 1612–14 Descent from the Cross. According to the art critic Hugh Davies, the open mouth of the victim and the predator leaning over the cross link the painting to Rubens' Descent. The mouth in Rubens' painting is loosely opened, but in Bacon's it is taut. The main figure's legs are folded out of view and the figure's left arm is passive in Rubens' painting, but in the Bacon's painting the chimera's legs and arms are in violent motion, seemingly wildly flailing up and down.

=== Cage ===
Horizontal frames often featured in Bacon's 1950s and 1960s paintings. The motif may have been borrowed from the sculptor Alberto Giacometti, who Bacon greatly admired and often corresponded with. Giacometti had employed the device in The Nose (1947) and The Cage (1950). Bacon's use of frames has suggested imprisonment to many commentators. Writing on their use in Fragment, Zweite mentions that the diagonal lines transform the cross into a guillotine.

== Reputation ==
The religious imagery belies Bacon's atheist and nihilistic outlook. The painting contains no hope for redemption. Friedhelm Mennekes writes that in the victim's scream, "there is not even a lament of being forsaken by God. A god does not emerge for the figure jerking in mortal anguish in the painting". Sharpe identifies the tiny oblivious stick-figure passersby as the element that mostly removes the work from "a straightforward recapitulation of ancient religious iconography and into postwar modernity".

Bacon was self-critical, and often destroyed or disowned his own work, including pieces held in high regard by critics and buyers. He came to dislike Fragment of a Crucifixion, viewing it as too simplistic and explicit, in the words of Russell, "too near the conventions of narrative-painting". This was an issue with which Bacon struggled throughout his career: he aimed to create imagery that would be instantly recognisable, immediate and directly involving for the viewer, while also staying loyal to his creed of producing "non-illustrative painting".

Bacon returned to the crucifixion theme in his 1962 Three Studies for a Crucifixion. That depiction is a more oblique and less literal utilisation of the iconography of the biblical scene, but a more direct invocation of imagery of the slaughterhouse and slabs of meat.

== See also ==
- List of paintings by Francis Bacon
