= Crucifixion (Francis Bacon, 1933) =

1933 painting by Francis Bacon

Crucifixion (1933)

Crucifixion (CR 33–01) is an oil-on-canvas painting by Francis Bacon, made in 1933 when Bacon was aged 23 or 24. It was one of three paintings on the subject of the Crucifixion of Jesus that he made in 1933, the others being his Crucifixion with Skull (CR 33–03), commissioned by art collector Michael Sadler, and Wound for a Crucifixion (later destroyed by Bacon). It is held in Damien Hirst's Murderme Collection.

== Description ==
The sombre work in tones of black, white and grey shows an abstracted white human figure with arms raised against a dark background. Space is marked out by lines denoting walls meeting a floor, and the horizontal bar of the cross. The subject, Jesus on the cross, is depicted like a stick man, with thin white arms looping up the crossbar, thin legs, and the head, hands and feet reduced to white blobs. The diaphanous body appears to be opening up like the folds of a ghostly cloak with the suggestion of ribs inside, resembling a grisaille reworking of an anatomical still life by Jean Siméon Chardin or Chaïm Soutine, or Rembrandt's 1638 painting Slaughtered Ox. It measures 62 cm × 48.5 cm (24.4 in × 19.1 in).

Like another 1933 Bacon painting, After Picasso, "La Danse" (CR33-02), it may be based in part on Pablo Picasso's 1925 work The Three Dancers (Tate Gallery), which has a central naked stick-like figure standing on one leg with arms raised in a Y-shape. Bacon's painting may also be influenced by his upbringing in Ireland and his attendance at the Oberammergau Passion Play in April 1930. There may also be echoes of the political violence accompanying Adolf Hitler's rise to power in the 1930s.

In turn, along with Matthias Grünewald's Isenheim Altarpiece, Bacon's Crucifixion influenced Graham Sutherland's 1946 crucifixion for St Matthew's Church, Northampton, and it has been cited as an inspiration for Jonathan Demme in his 1991 film The Silence of the Lambs.

It was Bacon's first work to attract public attention and the first to be reproduced in print when published in Herbert Read's book Art Now: An Introduction to the Theory of Modern Painting and Sculpture (1933), opposite Picasso's 1929 work Baigneuse aux bras leves ("Female bather with raised arms") (Phoenix Art Museum). Bacon's painting was exhibited at the Mayor Gallery under the title Composition (1933) and bought by Michael Sadler. Sadler also commissioned a new painting from Bacon: he sent Bacon an x-ray of his skull to be included in the painting, resulting in the 1933 work Crucifixion with Skull (sometimes known as Golgotha).

== History ==
The sales enabled Bacon to hold his first solo exhibition in 1934, in the basement at Sunderland House, Curzon Street in London, but Bacon was downcast at a negative review published in The Times. He submitted works for the London International Surrealist Exhibition in London in 1936, but in a further blow they were rejected as not being "sufficiently surreal". Some of his works were included in an exhibition of "Young British Painters" at Thomas Agnew & Sons in 1937. Disappointed with his reception and progress, Bacon destroyed many of his early works (including his 1939 painting Wound for a Crucifixion, one of few he later regretted losing) and turned away from painting for several years. He later admitted that his early works were not successful: merely decorative and lacking in substance. After a dissolute period of drinking, gambling, and love affairs, he returned to painting and in 1944 to the theme of the Crucifixion, adding organic forms inspired by Aeschylus's Oresteia, in his breakthrough work, Three Studies for Figures at the Base of a Crucifixion, the second panel of which echoes the motif of three lines emerging from a central figure.

After Sadler died in 1943, Bacon's 1933 Crucifixion was acquired by Colin Anderson after it was exhibited at the Redfern Gallery in 1946. It is now held in Damien Hirst's Murderme Collection.

== See also ==
- List of paintings by Francis Bacon

== Sources ==
- Crucifixion 1933 (CR 33-01), Estate of Francis Bacon
- Crucifixion with Skull 1933 (CR 33-03), Estate of Francis Bacon
- After Picasso, "La Danse" 1933 (CR33-02), Estate of Francis Bacon
- Picasso, The Three Dancers, 1925, Tate Gallery
- Picasso, Female bather with raised arms, Phoenix Art Museum
- Francis Bacon: Five reasons to visit, Tate Gallery
- Francis Bacon Artworks, The Art Story
- Francis Bacon exhibition, 2009
- "Picasso and Bacon: two giants of art", Art Gallery of New South Wales, 17 October 2012
- "Slaughterhouses and the smell of death: Francis Bacon’s vision of the Crucifixion", The Guardian, 3 April 2015
- "Francis Bacon and the Masters review – a cruel exposure of a con artist", The Guardian, 15 April 2015
- The Grotesque in Art and Literature: Theological Reflections, p.144, 169-171
- Ecce Homo: The Male-Body-in-Pain as Redemptive Figure, p. 136-140
