= Second Version of Triptych 1944 =

Painting by Francis Bacon

- Artist: Francis Bacon
- Year: 1988
- Type: Oil and acrylic on canvas
- Dimensions: 198 cm × 148 cm (78 in × 58 in)
- Location: Tate Britain; London

Second Version of Triptych 1944 is a 1988 triptych painted by Irish-born artist Francis Bacon. It is a reworking of Three Studies for Figures at the Base of a Crucifixion, 1944, Bacon's most widely known triptych, and the one which established his reputation as one of England's foremost post-war painters.

== Context ==
Bacon often painted second versions of his major paintings, including Painting (1946), which he reworked in 1971 when the original became too fragile to transport to exhibitions. In 1988, Bacon completed this near copy of the Three Studies. At 78 × 58 inches, this second version is over twice the size of the original, while the orange background has been replaced by a blood-red hue. His reason for creating this rework remains unclear, although Bacon told Richard Cook that he "always wanted to make a larger version of the first [Three Studies...]. I thought it could come off, but I think the first is better. I would have had to use the orange again so as to give a shock, that which red dissolves. But the tedium of doing it perhaps dissuaded me, because mixing that orange with pastel and then crushing it was an enormous job."

== Description ==
The figures occupy a proportionally smaller space on the canvas than in the 1944 version, a presentation that, according to the Tate Gallery's catalogue, "plung[es] them into a deep void". Critical opinion was mixed, and the triptych drew criticism from those who felt that its more refined painting technique robbed the image of much of its power. Denis Farr suggested that while the second version's larger scale gave it "a majestic quality which is highly effective", its svelte presentation lessened its shock value. Critic Jonathan Meades felt that though the 1988 triptych was a more polished and painterly work, it lacked the rawness of the original.

== See also ==
- List of paintings by Francis Bacon

== Sources ==
- Farr, Dennis; Peppiatt, Michael; Yard, Sally. Francis Bacon: A Retrospective. Harry N Abrams, 1999. ISBN 0-8109-2925-2
