= Slaughtered Ox =

Painting by Rembrandt

A Slaughtered Ox
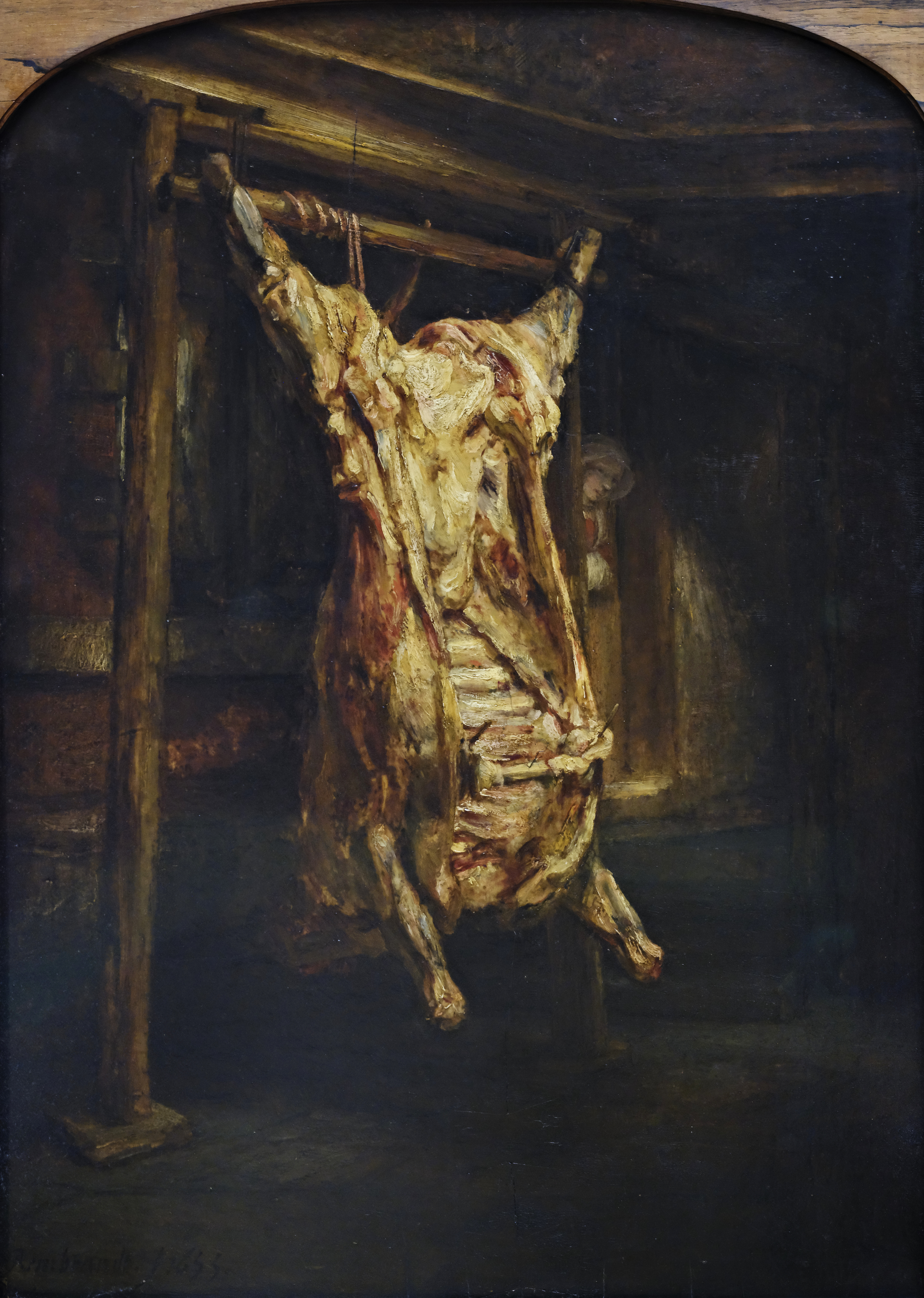
- Artist: Rembrandt
- Year: 1655
- Dimensions: 94 cm (37 in) × 69 cm (27 in)
- Location: Room 844
- Collection: Department of Paintings of the Louvre
- Identifiers: Joconde work ID: 000PE008568; RKDimages ID: 232216

Slaughtered Ox, also known as Flayed Ox, Side of Beef, or Carcass of Beef, is a 1655 oil on beech panel still life painting by Rembrandt. It has been in the collection of the Louvre in Paris since 1857. A similar painting is in Kelvingrove Art Gallery and Museum, Glasgow, possibly not created by Rembrandt himself but probably by one of his pupils, perhaps Carel Fabritius. Other similar paintings by Rembrandt or more likely his circle are held by museums in Budapest and Philadelphia.

The work follows in a tradition of artworks showing butchery, for example Pieter Aertsen's A Meat Stall with the Holy Family Giving Alms (1551) and Annibale Carracci's Butcher's Shop (c. 1583), and perhaps more specifically Joachim Beuckelaer's Slaughtered Pig (1563). Rembrandt made a drawing of a similar scene c. 1635. Another pre-1655 painting of a slaughtered ox (the example in Edinburgh, now attributed to Rembrandt's circle but formerly to Rembrandt) was perhaps inspired by a lost earlier work by Rembrandt himself. In northern Europe, November was traditionally the time for slaughtering livestock, before winter made feed difficult to find.

The painting measures 95.5 by 68.8 centimetres (37.6 in × 27.1 in), and is signed and dated "Rembrandt f. 1655". It shows the butchered carcass of a bull or an ox, hanging in a wooden building, possibly a stable or lean-to shed. The carcass is suspended by its two rear legs, which are tied by ropes to a wooden crossbeam. The animal has been decapitated and flayed of skin and hair, the chest cavity has been stretched open and the internal organs removed, revealing a mass of flesh, fat, connective tissue, joints, bones, and ribs. The carcass is carefully coloured, and given texture by impasto. In the background, a woman appears behind a half-open door, lifting the painting from still life into a genre painting, a scene of everyday life. It is sometimes considered a vanitas or memento mori; some commentators make references to the killing of the fatted calf in the biblical story of the Prodigal Son, others directly to the Crucifixion of Jesus.

The painting was possibly owned by Christoffel Hirschvogel in 1661. It was viewed by Joshua Reynolds in the collection of Pieter Locquet in Amsterdam in 1781, and later owned by Louis Viardot, who sold it to the Louvre in 1857 for 5,000 francs.

The work's muscular depiction inspired artists Honoré Daumier, Eugène Delacroix, and in multiple works, Chaïm Soutine and Francis Bacon. Most famously, Bacon's Figure with Meat (1954) depicts Pope Innocent X, as positioned by Diego Velázquez in Portrait of Innocent X (c. 1650), accompanied by what is likely a version of the carcass in Slaughtered Ox.

== Gallery ==
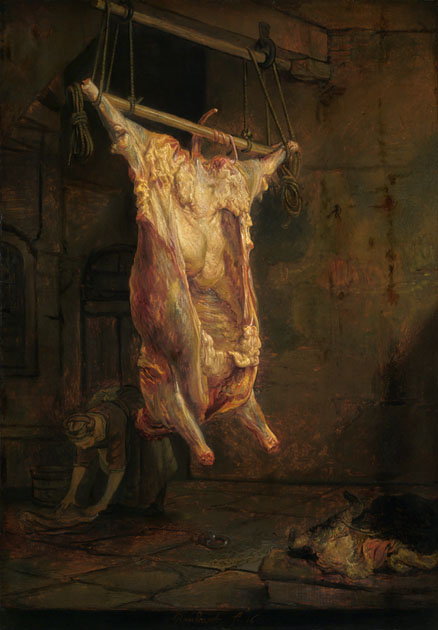
Similar painting in Glasgow, c. 1640, likely by a follower of Rembrandt

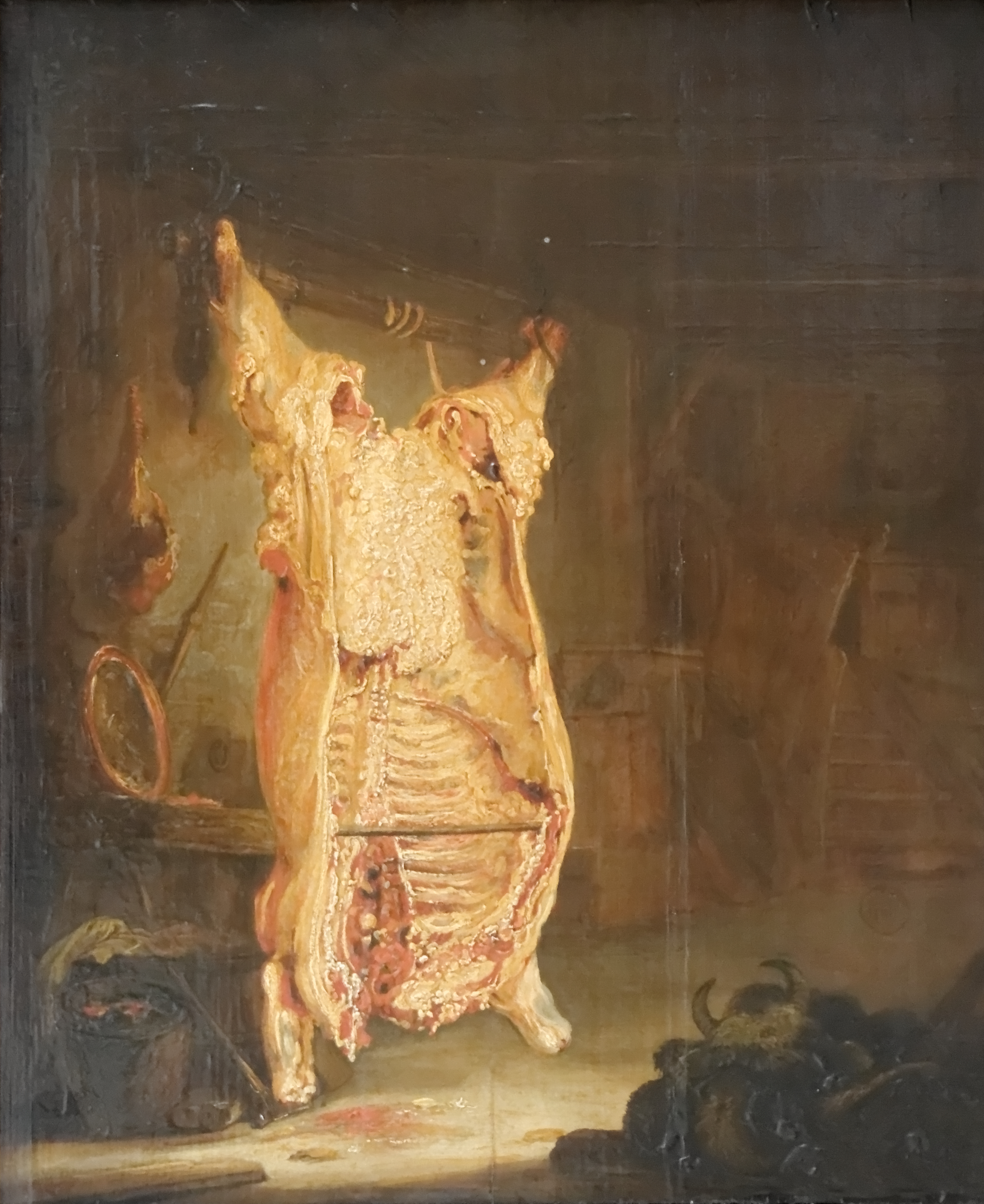
Similar painting in Budapest, 1639, likely by a follower of Rembrandt

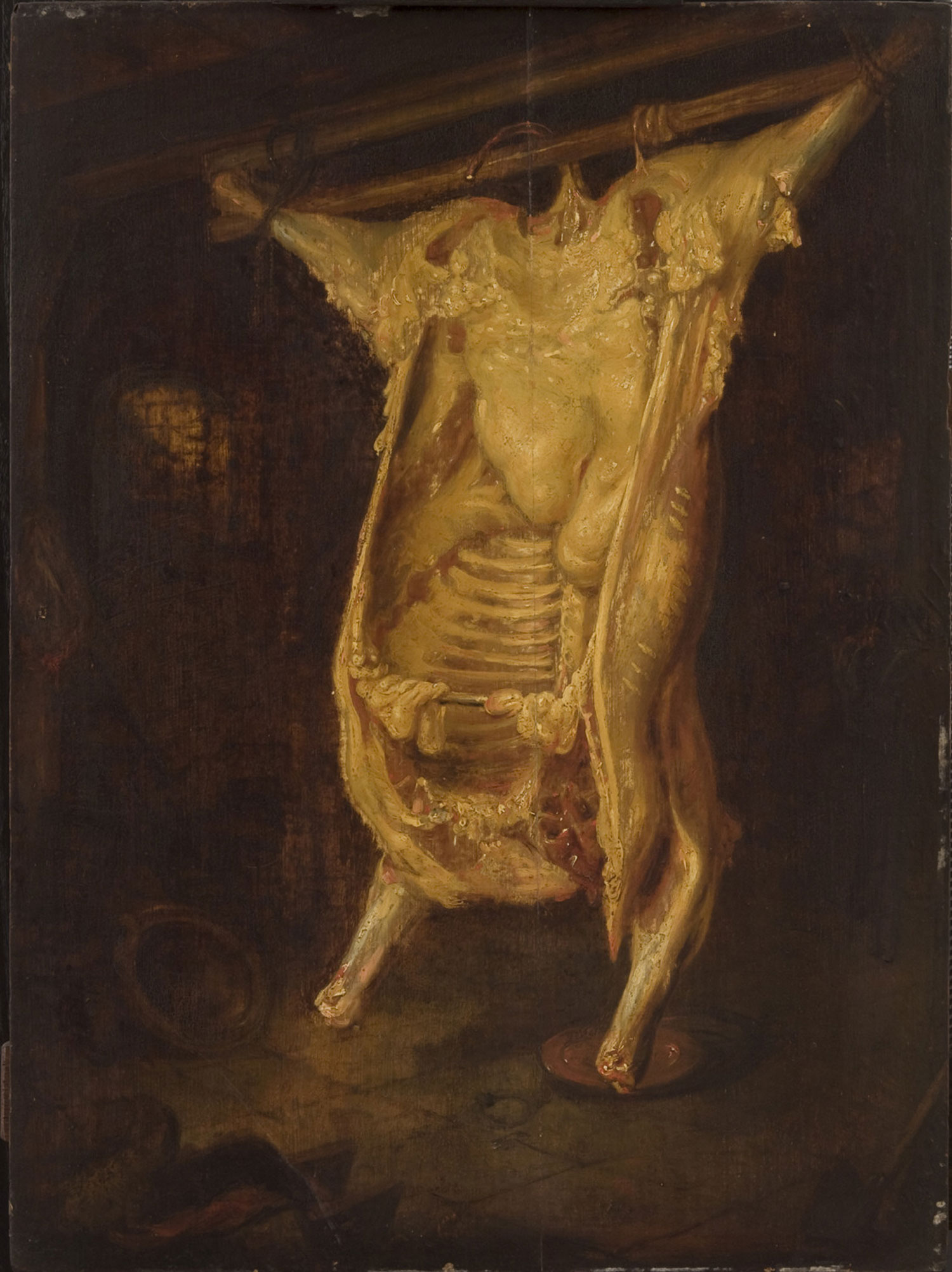
Similar painting in Philadelphia, 1640s, likely by a follower of Rembrandt

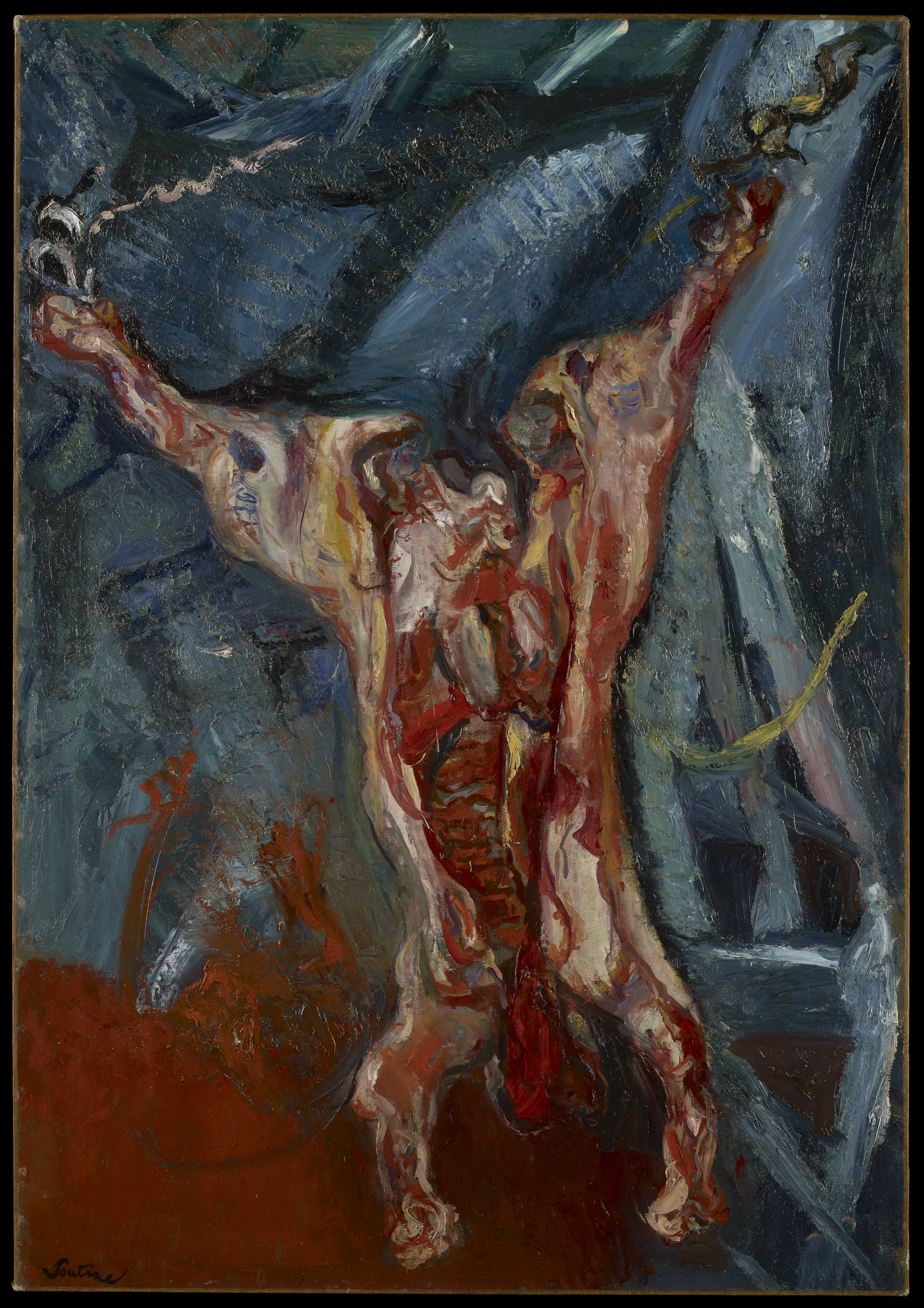
Soutine, Carcass of Beef, 1925

== See also ==
- List of paintings by Rembrandt
