= Three Studies for Figures at the Base of a Crucifixion =

1944 triptych by Francis Bacon

- Artist: Francis Bacon
- Year: 1944
- Type: Oil paint and pastel on fibre board
- Dimensions: 94 cm × 74 cm (37 in × 29 in)
- Location: Tate Britain, London

Three Studies for Figures at the Base of a Crucifixion is a 1944 triptych painted by the Irish-born British artist Francis Bacon. The canvasses are based on the Eumenides—or Furies—of Aeschylus's Oresteia, and depict three writhing anthropomorphic creatures set against a flat burnt orange background. It was executed in oil paint and pastel on Sundeala fibre board and completed within two weeks. The triptych summarises themes explored in Bacon's previous work, including his examination of Picasso's biomorphs and his interpretations of the crucifixion and the Greek Furies. Bacon did not realise his original intention to paint a large crucifixion scene and place the figures at the foot of the cross.

The Three Studies are generally considered Bacon's first mature piece; he regarded his works before the triptych as irrelevant, and throughout his life tried to suppress their appearance on the art market. When the painting was first exhibited in 1945 it caused a sensation and established him as one of the foremost post-war painters. Remarking on the cultural significance of Three Studies, the critic John Russell observed in 1971 that "there was painting in England before the Three Studies, and painting after them, and no one ... can confuse the two".

== Background ==
Francis Bacon painted sporadically and without commitment during the late 1920s and early 1930s, when he worked as an interior decorator and designer of furniture and rugs. He later said that his career was delayed because he had spent so long looking for a subject that would sustain his interest. He began to paint images based on the Crucifixion of Jesus in 1933, when his then-patron Eric Hall commissioned a series of three paintings based on the subject. These abstract figurations contain formal elements typical of their time, including diaphanous forms, flat backgrounds, and surrealist props such as flowers and umbrellas. The art critic Wieland Schmied noted that while the early works are "aesthetically pleasing", they lack "a sense of urgency or inner necessity; they are beautiful, but lifeless". The sentiment is echoed by Hugh Davies, who wrote that Bacon's 1933 paintings "suggest an artist concentrating more on formal than on expressive concerns". Bacon admitted that his early works were not successful; they were merely decorative and lacking in substance. He was often harshly self-critical during this period, and would abandon or destroy canvasses before they were completed. He abandoned the Crucifixion theme, then largely withdrew from painting in frustration, instead immersing himself in love affairs, drinking and gambling.

When he returned to the topic of the Crucifixion eleven years later, he retained some of the stylistic elements he had developed earlier, such as the elongated and dislocated organic forms that he now based on Oresteia. He continued to incorporate the spatial device he was to use many times throughout his career—three lines radiating from this central figure, which was first seen in Crucifixion. Three Studies was painted over the course of two weeks in 1944 when, Bacon recalled, "I was in a bad mood of drinking, and I did it under tremendous hangovers and drink; I sometimes hardly knew what I was doing. I think perhaps the drink helped me to be a bit freer." The painting was executed in a ground-floor flat at 7 Cromwell Place, South Kensington in London. A large back room in the building had been converted into a billiard room by its previous occupant, artist John Everett Millais. It was Bacon's studio by day; at night, abetted by Eric Hall and Bacon's childhood nanny Jessie Lightfoot, it functioned as an illicit casino.

Although he had been painting for almost twenty years, Bacon steadfastly insisted that Three Studies was the fons et origo of his career. He destroyed many of his earlier canvases and tried to suppress those that had left his studio. Bacon was emphatic that no pre-1944 images be admitted into his canon, and most of the early art critics agreed with this position. The early publications of John Russell and David Sylvester open with the 1944 triptych, and Bacon insisted to his death that no retrospective should feature paintings pre-dating 1944.

== Triptych ==
The panels of Three Studies for Figures at the Base of a Crucifixion are painted on light Sundeala boards, a material Bacon was using at the time as an inexpensive alternative to canvas. Each bears a single taut sculptural form pitched against a harsh orange background. The orange hue displays inconsistently across the canvases, due in part to the low level of oil in the paint, which resulted in varying rates of absorption into the board. The pallid flesh tones of the figures were achieved by overlaying grey and white brushstrokes, while the figures' props were coloured using a variety of yellow, green, white, and purple tones.

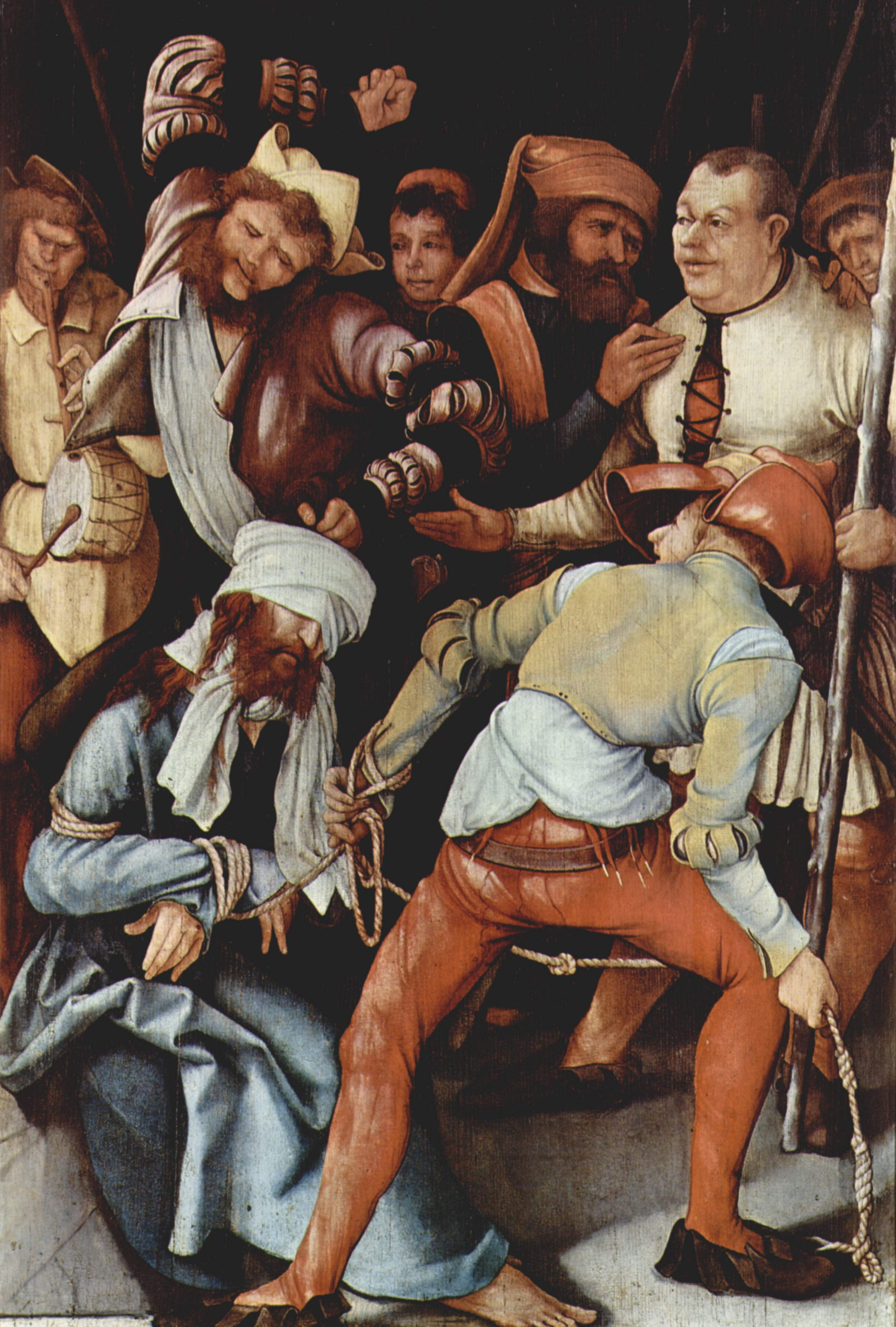
The blindfolded Christ in Matthias Grünewald's Mocking of Christ, c. 1503, was an influence on the presentation of the central figure in Bacon's Three Studies.

The art critic Hugh Davies has suggested that of the three figures, that on the left most closely resembles a human form, and that it might represent a mourner at the cross. Seated on a table-like structure, this limbless creature has an elongated neck, heavily rounded shoulders, and a thick mop of dark hair. Like its affiliate objects, the left-hand figure is portrayed with layers of white and grey paint.

The central figure's mouth is positioned directly on its neck, rather than on a distinct face. It bares its teeth as if in a snarl, and is blindfolded by a drooping cloth bandage—a device likely drawn from Matthias Grünewald's Mocking of Christ. This creature faces the viewer directly and is centralised by a series of converging lines radiating from the base of the pedestal.

Situated on an isolated patch of grass, the right-hand figure's toothed mouth is stretched open as if screaming, although David Sylvester has suggested that it may be yawning. Its mouth is open to a degree impossible for a human skull. The orange background of this panel is brighter than the hues rendered in the other frames, and the figure's neck opens up into a row of teeth, while a protruding ear juts out from behind its lower jaw. This panel closely resembles an earlier painting by Bacon, Untitled, c. 1943, which was thought destroyed until it re-emerged in 1997.

Inspection under infrared has revealed that the panels were heavily reworked during several revisions. The legs of the central figure are surrounded by small magenta horseshoe shapes, which infrared shows to have been first drafted as flowers. The area below the head is thickly coated with white and orange paint, while the inspection exposes a series of underlying curved brushstrokes used to compose a landscape, and a small distant reclining figure. When the canvas is unframed, measuring marks are visible on the outer margin of board, indicating that the composition was carefully conceived.

Bacon said in a 1959 letter that the figures in Three Studies were "intended to [be] use[d] at the base of a large Crucifixion which I may still do". By this, Bacon implied that the figures were conceived as a predella to a larger altarpiece. The biographer Michael Peppiatt has suggested that the panels may have emerged as single works, and that the idea of combining them as a triptych came later. There is little in the themes or styles of the three panels to suggest that they were originally conceived as a whole. Though they share the same orange background, Bacon had already used this colour in two prior pieces; moreover, his oeuvre can be characterised by periods that are dominated by a single background colour. From the beginning of his career, Bacon preferred to work in series and found that his imagination was stimulated by sequences; as he put it, "images breed other images in me."

The Crucifixion itself is conspicuously absent, and there is no trace or shadow of its presence in the panels. Writing in 1996, Wieland Schmied noted that the three Furies have replaced Christ and the two thieves crucified on either side of him. The form of the Furies is borrowed directly from Picasso's late 1920s and mid-1930s pictures of biomorphs on beaches, in particular from the Spanish artist's The Bathers (1937). However, the eroticism and comedy of Picasso's figures have been replaced by a sense of menace and terror derived in part from Matthias Grünewald's Mocking of Christ.

== Themes and style ==
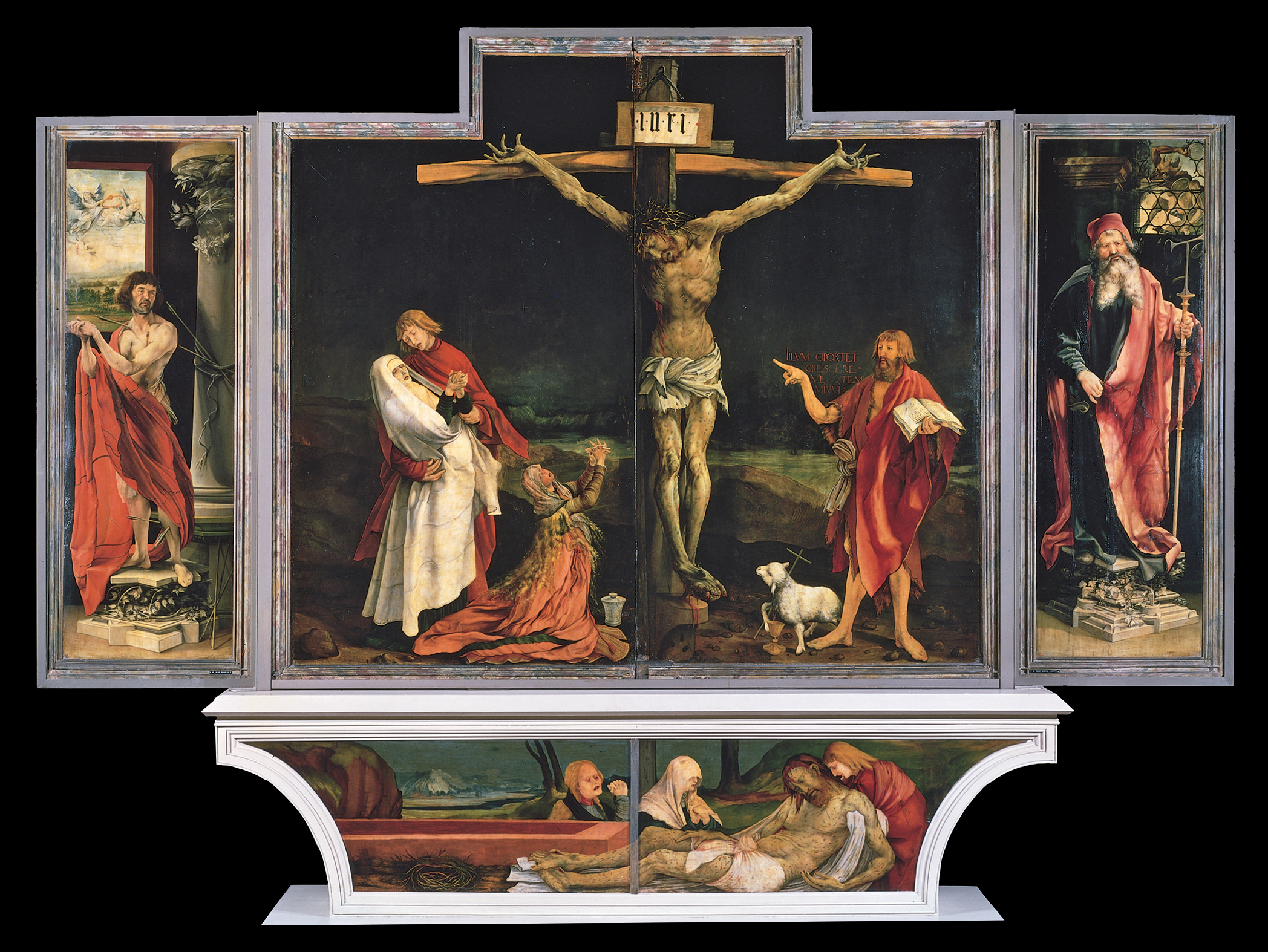
The figures at the base of The Crucifixion from Grünewald's Isenheim Altarpiece were an influence on Bacon's Three Studies. The British painter knew this picture since at least 1929.

Three Studies for Figures at the Base of a Crucifixion is a key precursor to Bacon's later work, and he sustained its formal and thematic preoccupations throughout his career. The triptych format, the placement of figures behind glass in heavily gilded frames, the open mouth, the use of painterly distortion, the Furies, and the theme of the Crucifixion were all to reappear in later works. Bacon's principal mode of expression is introduced: the subjects are anatomically and physically distorted, and the mood is violent, foreboding, and relentlessly physical. In other respects the triptych stands apart from other paintings in his oeuvre. It refers directly to its inspirations, and interprets the source material in an uncharacteristically literal manner. The triptych is further distinct in that its creatures are located in an outside space; by 1948, Bacon's studies of heads and figures specifically emphasised their confinement in rooms or other closed spaces.

Although Bacon stated that he modelled the creatures on the Furies, the visual link to the sources is barely perceptible in his finished work. The mood and tone of the painting, however, is consistent with the agonised spirit of the Furies' legend. They are traditionally depicted as ancient chthonic deities preoccupied with avenging patricide and matricide by hunting down and killing violent criminals. In Aeschylus' The Oresteia, the title character is pursued by the Furies in revenge for the murder of his mother Clytemnestra. The saga tells the story of the decimation of the line of Atreus; Clytemnestra had hacked to death her husband Agamemnon, and later slew Cassandra, who had foreseen the murders and declared: "Drunken, drunken with blood / To make them dare the more, a reveling rout / Is in the rooms which no man shall cast out, of sister Furies."

Francis Bacon. Study for the Nurse in the Battleship Potemkin, 1957, a later study of the screaming mouth based on the Eisenstein still

Bacon did not seek to illustrate the narrative of the tale, however. He told the French art critic Michel Leiris, "I could not paint Agamemnon, Clytemnestra or Cassandra, as that would have been merely another kind of historical painting ... Therefore I tried to create an image of the effect it produced inside me." Aeschylus' phrase "the reek of human blood smiles out at me" in particular haunted Bacon, and his treatments of the mouth in the triptych and many subsequent paintings were attempts to visualise the sentiment. In 1985, he observed that Aeschylus' phrase brought up in him "the most exciting images, and I often read it ... the violence of it brings up the images in me, 'the reek of human blood smiles out at me', well what could be more amazing than that."

Bacon was introduced to Aeschylus through T. S. Eliot's 1939 play The Family Reunion, in which the protagonist Harry is haunted by "the sleepless hunters / that will not let me sleep". In Eliot's play, the Furies serve as embodiments of the remorse and guilt felt by Harry, who harbours a dark family secret, shared only with his sister. Bacon was captivated by Aeschylus' play, and keen to learn more about Greek tragedy, and said many times that he regretted being unable to read the original in Greek. In 1942, he read the Irish scholar William Bedell Stanford's Aeschylus in his Style, and found the theme of obsessive guilt in The Oresteia to be highly resonant. In 1984, Bacon told Sylvester that although his painting's subject matter did not have a direct relationship with the poet's work, for him Eliot's work "opened the valves of sensation".

The mouth of the triptych's central figure was also inspired by the nurse's scream in film director Sergei Eisenstein's Odessa Steps massacre sequence in The Battleship Potemkin (1925). In 1985, the broadcaster Melvyn Bragg confronted Bacon with a reproduction of the centre panel during the filming of a South Bank Show documentary, and observed that in his earlier career the artist seemed preoccupied with the physicality of the human mouth. Bacon replied, "I had always thought that I would be able to make the mouth with all the beauty of a Monet landscape though I never succeeded in doing so." When Bragg asked why he thought he had failed, Bacon admitted, "It should be all much more colour, should have got more of the interior of the mouth, with all the colours of the interior of the mouth, but I didn't happen to get it."

Other than in Picasso's exploration of the theme, the Crucifixion did not figure prominently in twentieth-century painting. The Surrealists exploited its shock value, and it was used as a vehicle for blasphemy in isolated instances. Bacon often expressed his admiration for the manner in which old masters such as Cimabue treated the Crucifixion; however, as with Picasso, he was more interested in tackling the subject from a secular, humanist point of view. For Three Studies, Bacon did not approach the Crucifixion as a Christian image per se, but rather found that the scene reflected a particular view of humanity he held. As he told David Sylvester: "it was just an act of man's behaviour, a way of behaviour to another."

The Passion of Christ became a central concern during the early development of Bacon's work, and he returned to the subject throughout his career. When asked by critic Jean Clair why his Crucifixion scenes tended to comprise mainly "slaughter, butchery, mutilated meat and flesh", Bacon replied, "that's all the Crucifixion was, isn't it? ... Actually, you can't think of anything more barbaric than the Crucifixion, and that particular way of killing somebody." While Three Studies may have begun as an attempt to directly represent the Crucifixion scene, his explorations led him towards "something completely different". Bacon came to regard the scene as an armature for exploring new ways of representing human behaviours and emotions. For him it amounted to a kind of self-portraiture; a vehicle for working on "all sorts of very private feelings about behaviour and about the way life is".

Coming in 1944, the triptych was often thought to be informed by the Second World War. Art critic Ziva Amishai-Maisels observes that the canvas reflects Bacon's own confusion and ambivalence "towards manifestations of violence and power, both of which attracted and repulsed him simultaneously."

== Critical reaction ==
Three Studies was first shown at a joint exhibition at the Lefevre Gallery, London, in April 1945, alongside work by Henry Moore and Graham Sutherland. Bacon was then unknown and it is likely that his painting was included at the request of Sutherland, his close friend at the time. The Lefevre exhibition coincided with the final days of World War II in Europe, and John Russell has observed that the immediate post-war period in British history was marked by an atmosphere of nostalgia and optimism—a sense that "everything was going to be alright, and visitors went into the Lefevre in a spirit of thanksgiving for perils honourably surmounted."

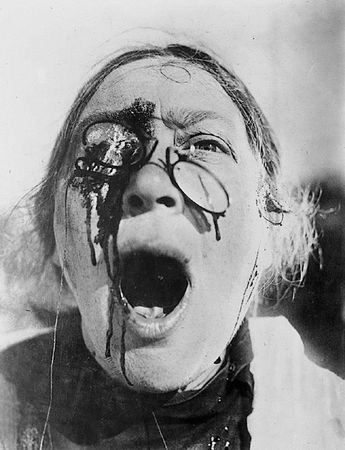
Still from Sergei Eisenstein's 1925 silent film The Battleship Potemkin. Bacon called the image a key catalyst for his work, and incorporated the shape of the mouth when painting the central figure.

Both the public and critics were unnerved by the sight of the work. Russell describes being shocked by "images so unrelievedly awful that the mind shut with a snap at the sight of them. Their anatomy was half-human, half-animal, and they were confined in a low-ceilinged, windowless and oddly proportioned space. They could bite, probe, and suck, and they had very long eel-like necks, but their functioning in other respects was mysterious. Ears and mouths they had, but two at least of them were sightless." Writing for Apollo magazine, Herbert Furst recalled, "I, I must confess, was so shocked and disturbed by the Surrealism of Francis Bacon that I was glad to escape from this exhibition. Perhaps it was the red [sic] background that made me think of entrails, of an anatomy or a vivisection and feel squeamish." The triptych caused a sensation, and overnight turned Bacon into the most controversial painter in the country.

Reviewing for the New Statesman and Nation, Raymond Mortimer wrote that the work "seems served from Picasso's Crucifixion [1930], but further distorted, with ostrich necks and button heads protruding from bags—the whole effect gloomily phallic, like Bosch without the humour. These objects are perched on stools, and depicted as if they were sculpture, as in the Picassos of 1930. I have no doubt of Mr. Bacon's uncommon gifts, but these pictures expressing his sense of the atrocious world into which we have survived seems [to me] symbols of outrage rather than works of art. If peace redresses him, he may delight as he now dismays." Reflecting on the critical and public reaction, Bacon said that he had "never known why my paintings are known as horrible. I'm always labelled with horror, but I never think about horror. Pleasure is such a diverse thing. And horror is too. Can you call the famous Isenheim altar a horror piece? It's one of the greatest paintings of the Crucifixion, with the body studded with thorns like nails, but oddly enough the form is so grand it takes away from the horror. But that is the horror in the sense that it is so vitalising; isn't that how people came out of the great tragedies? People came out as though purged into happiness, into a fuller reality of existence."

Irish author Colm Tóibín noted in 2006 that the triptych has retained its "genuinely startling" impact. Matthew Kieran wrote, in his 2005 essay on the painting, that "these frightened, blind, raging figures are visceral in their impact, jolting one into sensations of fright, horror, isolation and angst. We react to them as self-conscious creatures, their postures and expressions revealing feelings of petrified isolation, searing horror, pain and blind confusion." As of 2007, Three Studies is part of Tate Britain's permanent collection, having been donated by Bacon's lover Eric Hall in 1953.

== Second Version of Triptych 1944 (1988) ==
Bacon often created second versions of his major paintings. In 1988, he completed a near-copy of the original Three Studies. With each panel at 78 × 58 inches (198 × 147 cm), this second version is more than twice the size of the original, and the orange background has been replaced by a blood-red hue. The figures occupy a smaller proportion of the canvas than those of the 1944 version, a device which, according to the Tate Gallery's catalogue, "plung[es] them into a deep void".

Critical opinion was mixed; the 1988 triptych drew criticism from those who felt that its more refined painting technique robbed the image of much of its power. Denis Farr suggested that while the second version's larger scale gave it "a majestic quality which is highly effective", its svelte presentation lessened its shock value. Critic Jonathan Meades felt that while the 1988 triptych was a more polished and painterly work, it lacked the rawness of the original.

Reflecting on Bacon's tendency to revisit subject matter, Meades observed that "Bacon's auto-plagiarism in areas other than portraiture had less deleterious consequences. Nonetheless the 1988 version (or near copy) of the great 1944 Crucifixion Triptych is the lesser work: it is slicker, more polished and it evinces a greater ease with paint. The backgrounds are now elaborated, defined and bereft of the garish, grating poison orange of 1944." The art critic James Demetrion found that despite these differences, the second version still achieves the power and impact of the first.

== See also ==
- List of paintings by Francis Bacon
