= Michael Peppiatt =

English art historian, curator and writer

- Born: 9 October 1941 (age 84); Wycombe, Buckinghamshire
- Education: University of Cambridge
- Occupations: Writer and art historian
- Website: michaelpeppiatt.com

Michael Henry Peppiatt (born 9 October 1941) is an English art historian, curator and writer.

== Biography ==
Son of Edward George Peppiatt (died 1983), B.Sc., ARCS, of Silver Birches, Stocking Pelham, near Buntingford, Hertfordshire, technical and production director for a pharmaceutical manufacturing company, and Elsa Eugénie (née Schlaich; died 1997).

=== Education and career ===
Michael Peppiatt studied at Brentwood School, Essex, at the University of Göttingen, and at Trinity Hall, Cambridge (BA 1964, MA 1985, PhD) and subsequently joined The Observer as a junior art critic. He then went to Paris to take up an editorial job at Réalités magazine, where he remained until 1969, when he was appointed arts editor at Le Monde. In the mid-1970s he began reporting on cultural events across Europe for The New York Times and The Financial Times, becoming Paris correspondent for several art magazines, notably Art News and Art International. In 1985, Peppiatt became owner and editor of Art International, which he relaunched from Paris, devoting special issues to the artists he most admired.

In 1994, Peppiatt returned to London with his wife, the art historian Jill Lloyd, and their two children, where he wrote the biography of Francis Bacon (1909–1992), whose close friend and commentator he had been for thirty years. Chosen as a "Book of the Year" by The New York Times and translated into several languages, the biography is considered the definitive account of Bacon's life and work.

Peppiatt has curated numerous exhibitions worldwide, notably travelling retrospectives of the School of London, Francis Bacon, Alberto Giacometti, Christian Schad and Antoni Tàpies. In 2009, Peppiatt curated an exhibition of sculpture by Dado for the Venice Biennale, a Maillol retrospective for Barcelona, and a Caravaggio-Bacon exhibit for the Galleria Borghese in Rome.

In 2005, Peppiatt was awarded a Ph.D by the University of Cambridge for his publications on 20th-century art. He is a member of the Society of Authors and the Royal Society of Literature, and since 2010 he has been on the board of the Palazzo delle Esposizioni in Rome.

In 2012, Peppiatt published Interviews with Artists, a book of more than forty interviews with personalities ranging from Jean Dubuffet, Balthus, and Oscar Niemeyer to Brassai, Henri Cartier-Bresson, and Antoni Tàpies. An exhibition on this theme was shown at Eykyn Maclean in London.

Peppiatt curated a Miró exhibition that travelled from the Bucerius Kunst Forum in Hamburg to the Kunstsammlung, Düsseldorf, in 2014–15. Peppiatt's latest memoir, Francis Bacon in Your Blood, was published by Bloomsbury in August 2015. In 2018, Peppiatt curated the exhibition Bacon/Giacometti at the Beyeler Foundation, Switzerland. In 2022, Peppiatt curated the exhibition, Francis Bacon: Man and Beast, at the Royal Academy of Arts, London. The exhibition charts the development of Bacon's work through the lens of his fascination with animals and its impact on his treatment of the human figure.

Peppiatt serves on the advisory council of the UK Friends of the National Museum of Women in the Arts. He is a Fellow of the Society of Antiquaries and the Royal Historical Society.

== Bibliography ==
- 1964: Modern Art in Britain
- 1976: Francis Bacon: l’art de l’impossible (trans. with Michel Leiris)
- 1983: Imagination’s Chamber: Artists and their Studios (with Alice Bellony Rewald)
- 1987: The School of London
- 1997: Francis Bacon: Anatomy of an Enigma
- 2000: Zoran Music
- 2001: Alberto Giacometti in Post-War Paris
- 2002: Aristide Maillol
- 2003: Christian Schad and the Neue Sachlichkeit (ed. with Jill Lloyd)
- 2003: Dans l’atelier de Giacometti
- 2003: Vincent van Gogh
- 2004: Francis Bacon: le sacré et le profane
- 2006: L’amitié Leiris-Bacon: Une étrange fascination
- 2006: Francis Bacon in the 1950s
- 2006: Les dilemmes de Jean Dubuffet
- 2007: Van Gogh and Expressionism (ed. with Jill Lloyd)
- 2008 Francis Bacon in the 1950s
- 2008: Francis Bacon: Studies for a Portrait
- 2008: Francis Bacon: Anatomy of an Enigma (revised edition)
- 2009: Caravaggio/Bacon
- 2010: In Giacometti's Studio
- 2010: Alberto Giacometti: An Intimate Portrait
- 2012: Interviews with Artists (1966–2012)
- 2013: Giacometti and Sartre: A Double Portrait
- 2014: Art Plural: Voices of Contemporary Art
- 2014: Henri Cartier-Bresson
- 2014: Joan Miró: A Painter among Poets
- 2015: Francis Bacon In Your Blood: A Memoir
- 2017: David Hockney, Souvenirs
- 2019: The Existential Englishman
- 2020: The Making of Modern Art: Selected Essays
- 2021: Francis Bacon: Studies for a Portrait (revised and enlarged edition)
- 2021: Conversations avec Adrian Ghenie
- 2021: Bacon/Giacometti: A Dialogue
- 2021: Francis Bacon: Man and Beast
- 2021: Only Too Much Is Enough: Francis Bacon In His Own Words
- 2023: Artists' Lives
- 2023: Giacometti in Paris
- 2024: Francis Bacon: A Self-Portrait in Words
