= 1896 Wesleyan Methodists football team =

American college football season

1896 Wesleyan Methodists football
- Conference: Independent
- Record: 4–5–1
- Head coach: William T. Bull (5th season)
- Captain: Wilson

1896 Eastern college football independents records
	Conf.			Overall
Team	W	L	T	W		L		T
Fordham		–		1	–	0	–	0
Lafayette		–		11	–	0	–	1
Princeton		–		10	–	0	–	1
Washington & Jefferson		–		8	–	0	–	1
Penn		–		14	–	1	–	0
Yale		–		13	–	1	–	0
Pittsburgh College		–		11	–	2	–	0
Buffalo		–		9	–	1	–	2
Villanova		–		10	–	4	–	0
Bucknell		–		5	–	2	–	1
Harvard		–		7	–	4	–	0
Boston College		–		5	–	3	–	0
Storrs		–		5	–	3	–	0
Cornell		–		5	–	3	–	1
Syracuse		–		5	–	3	–	2
Temple		–		3	–	2	–	0
Army		–		3	–	2	–	1
Rutgers		–		6	–	6	–	0
Carlisle		–		5	–	5	–	0
Holy Cross		–		2	–	2	–	2
Brown		–		4	–	5	–	1
Wesleyan		–		4	–	5	–	1
Dickinson		–		4	–	5	–	0
Franklin & Marshall		–		3	–	4	–	2
Geneva		–		3	–	4	–	0
Penn State		–		3	–	4	–	0
Colgate		–		3	–	4	–	1
Western Univ. Penn.		–		3	–	6	–	0
Lehigh		–		2	–	5	–	0
Tufts		–		2	–	6	–	1
Swarthmore		–		2	–	6	–	0
New Hampshire		–		1	–	4	–	0
Drexel		–		1	–	5	–	0
Massachusetts		–		0	–	4	–	0
Rhode Island		–		0	–	4	–	0

The 1896 Wesleyan Methodists football team represented Wesleyan University as an independent during the 1896 college football season. Led by William T. Bull in his fifth and final season as head coach, the Methodists compiled a record of 4–5–1.

== Schedule ==
Date	Time	Opponent	Site	Result	Attendance	Source
October 7		at Williams	Weston Field; Williamstown, MA	L 0–6	800	
October 10		Worcester Tech	Middletown, CT	W 12–4		
October 14	4:00 p.m.	at Harvard	Soldiers' Field; Boston, MA	L 0–28		
October 17		Amherst	Wesleyan campus; Middletown, CT	W 6–0	200	
October 21		at Yale	Yale Field; New Haven, CT	L 0–16		
October 28		at Amherst	Pratt Field; Amherst, MA	L 4–6	400	
October 31		Tufts	Wesleyan camnpus; Middletown, CT	W 28–4		
November 7	3:00 p.m.	at Army	The Plain; West Point, NY	T 12–12		
November 14	2:30 p.m.	Trinity (CT)	Middletown, CT (rivalry)	W 24–12	1,000	
November 21		at Lafayette	Lafayette Field; Easton, PA	L 0–18		
