= 1896 Harvard Crimson football team =

American college football season

1896 Harvard Crimson football
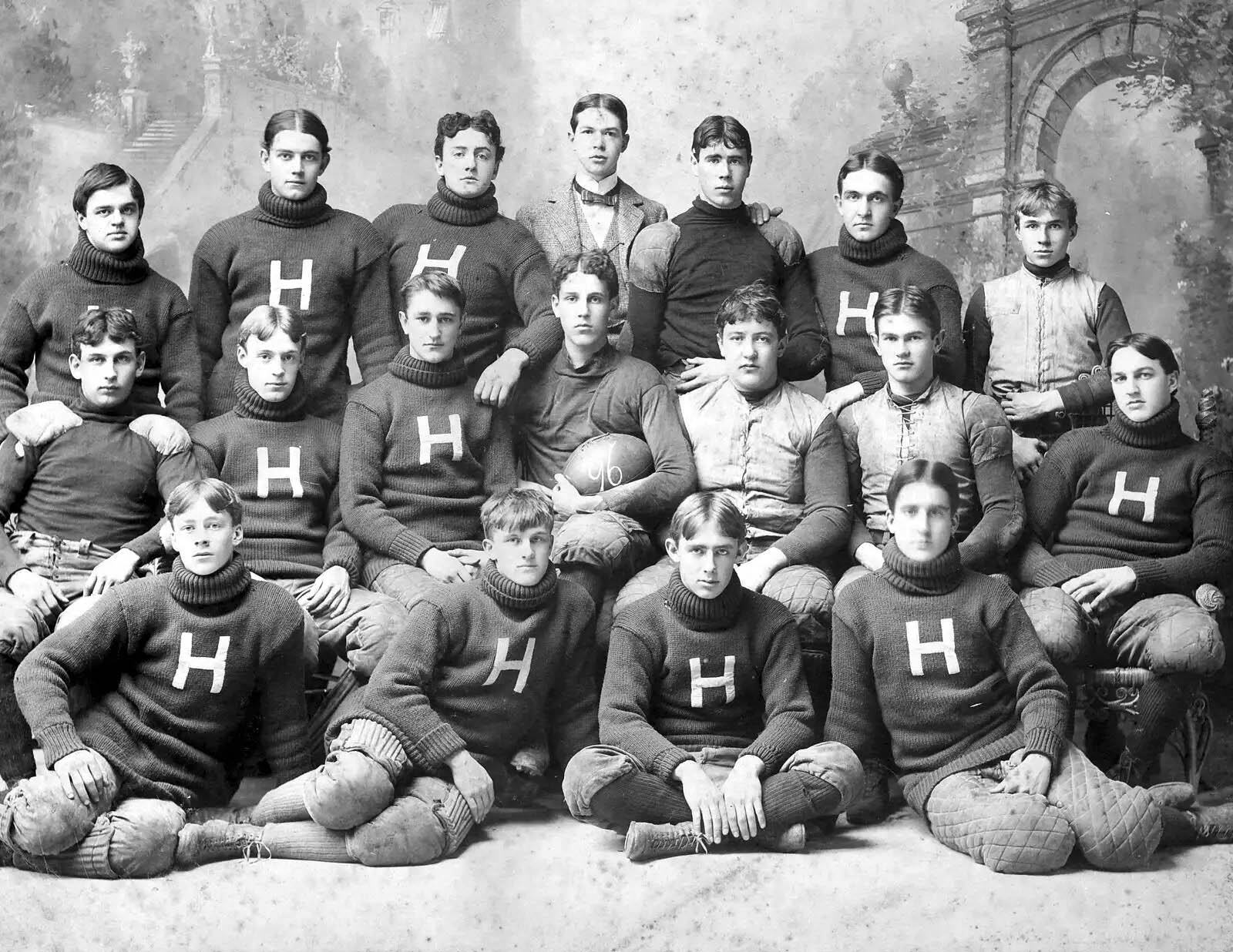
- Conference: Independent
- Record: 7–4
- Head coach: Bert Waters (1st season)
- Captain: Edgar Wrightington
- Home stadium: Soldiers' Field

1896 Eastern college football independents records
	Conf.			Overall
Team	W	L	T	W		L		T
Fordham		–		1	–	0	–	0
Lafayette		–		11	–	0	–	1
Princeton		–		10	–	0	–	1
Washington & Jefferson		–		8	–	0	–	1
Penn		–		14	–	1	–	0
Yale		–		13	–	1	–	0
Pittsburgh College		–		11	–	2	–	0
Buffalo		–		9	–	1	–	2
Villanova		–		10	–	4	–	0
Bucknell		–		5	–	2	–	1
Harvard		–		7	–	4	–	0
Boston College		–		5	–	3	–	0
Storrs		–		5	–	3	–	0
Cornell		–		5	–	3	–	1
Syracuse		–		5	–	3	–	2
Temple		–		3	–	2	–	0
Army		–		3	–	2	–	1
Rutgers		–		6	–	6	–	0
Carlisle		–		5	–	5	–	0
Holy Cross		–		2	–	2	–	2
Brown		–		4	–	5	–	1
Wesleyan		–		4	–	5	–	1
Dickinson		–		4	–	5	–	0
Franklin & Marshall		–		3	–	4	–	2
Geneva		–		3	–	4	–	0
Penn State		–		3	–	4	–	0
Colgate		–		3	–	4	–	1
Western Univ. Penn.		–		3	–	6	–	0
Lehigh		–		2	–	5	–	0
Tufts		–		2	–	6	–	1
Swarthmore		–		2	–	6	–	0
New Hampshire		–		1	–	4	–	0
Drexel		–		1	–	5	–	0
Massachusetts		–		0	–	4	–	0
Rhode Island		–		0	–	4	–	0

The 1896 Harvard Crimson football team represented Harvard University in the 1896 college football season. The Crimson finished with a 7–4 record under first-year head coach Bert Waters. The team won its first six games, but lost four of the final five games, including losses to rivals Princeton and Penn.

== Schedule ==
Date	Time	Opponent	Site	Result	Attendance	Source
October 3	3:30 p.m.	Williams	Soldiers' Field; Boston, MA	W 6–0	3,000	
October 7	3:30 p.m.	Trinity (CT)	Soldiers' Field; Boston, MA	W 34–0		
October 10	3:30 p.m.	Newton Athletic Association	Soldiers' Field; Boston, MA	W 18–0	2,000	
October 14	4:00 p.m.	Wesleyan	Soldiers' Field; Boston, MA	W 28–0		
October 17	3:00 p.m.	Brown	Soldiers' Field; Boston, MA	W 12–0	4,000	
October 24	3:00 p.m.	at Cornell	Percy Field; Ithaca, NY	W 13–4	6,000	
October 28	4:00 p.m.	vs. Harvard alumni	Soldiers' Field; Boston, MA	L 5–8		
October 31	3:00 p.m.	Carlisle	Soldiers' Field; Boston, MA	W 4–0	12,000	
November 7		Princeton	Soldiers' Field; Boston, MA (rivalry)	L 0–12	20,000	
November 14	3:00 p.m.	Boston Athletic Association	Soldiers' Field; Boston, MA	L 6–8		
November 21		at Penn	Franklin Field; Philadelphia, PA (rivalry)	L 6–8	19,487	
