= 1896 Princeton Tigers football team =

American college football season

1896 Princeton Tigers football
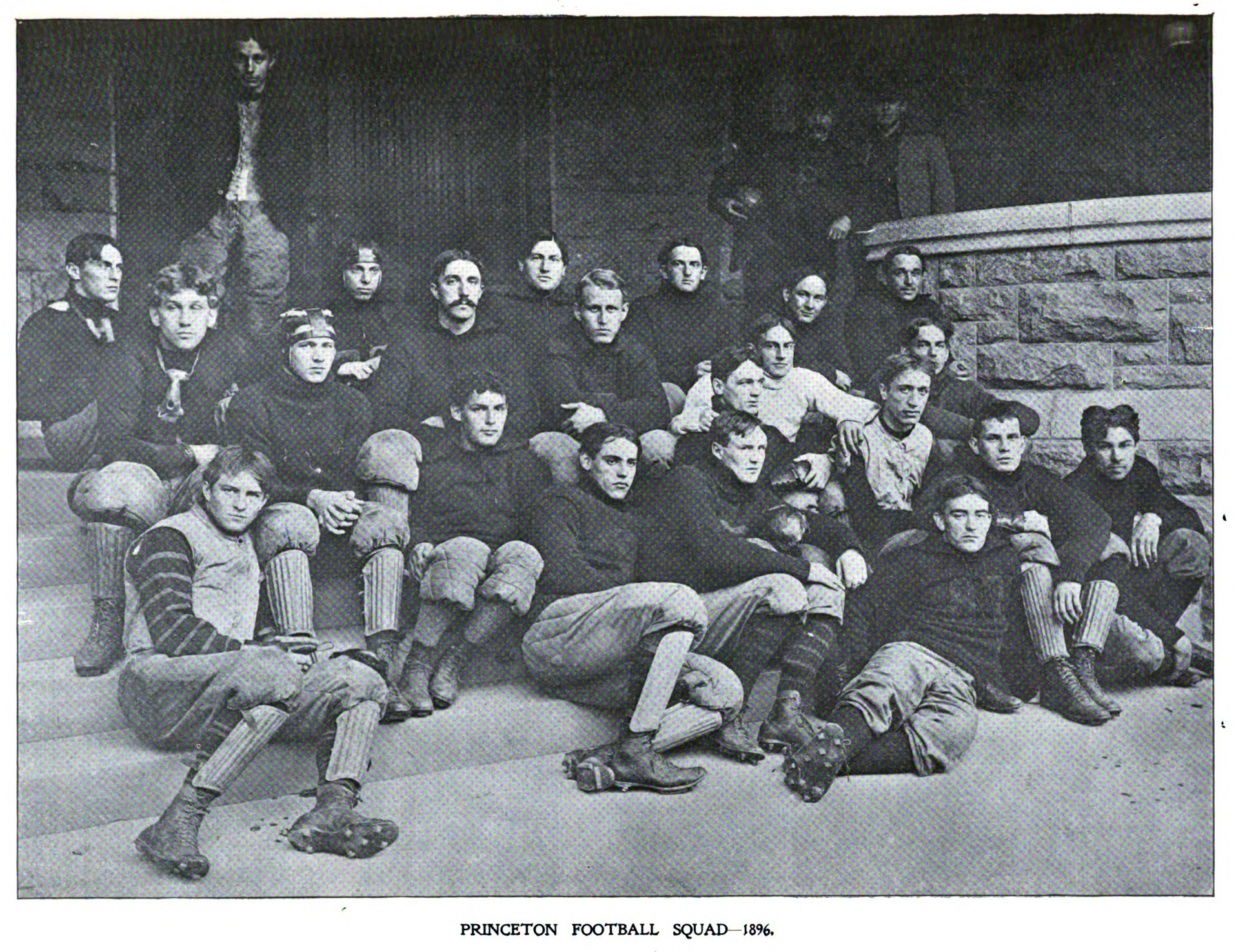

National champion (Billingsley, Helms, Houlgate) Co-national champion (NCF, Davis)
- Conference: Independent
- Record: 10–0–1
- Head coach: Franklin Morse (1st season)
- Captain: Garrett Cochran

1896 Eastern college football independents records
	Conf.			Overall
Team	W	L	T	W		L		T
Fordham		–		1	–	0	–	0
Lafayette		–		11	–	0	–	1
Princeton		–		10	–	0	–	1
Washington & Jefferson		–		8	–	0	–	1
Penn		–		14	–	1	–	0
Yale		–		13	–	1	–	0
Pittsburgh College		–		11	–	2	–	0
Buffalo		–		9	–	1	–	2
Villanova		–		10	–	4	–	0
Bucknell		–		5	–	2	–	1
Harvard		–		7	–	4	–	0
Boston College		–		5	–	3	–	0
Storrs		–		5	–	3	–	0
Cornell		–		5	–	3	–	1
Syracuse		–		5	–	3	–	2
Temple		–		3	–	2	–	0
Army		–		3	–	2	–	1
Rutgers		–		6	–	6	–	0
Carlisle		–		5	–	5	–	0
Holy Cross		–		2	–	2	–	2
Brown		–		4	–	5	–	1
Wesleyan		–		4	–	5	–	1
Dickinson		–		4	–	5	–	0
Franklin & Marshall		–		3	–	4	–	2
Geneva		–		3	–	4	–	0
Penn State		–		3	–	4	–	0
Colgate		–		3	–	4	–	1
Western Univ. Penn.		–		3	–	6	–	0
Lehigh		–		2	–	5	–	0
Tufts		–		2	–	6	–	1
Swarthmore		–		2	–	6	–	0
New Hampshire		–		1	–	4	–	0
Drexel		–		1	–	5	–	0
Massachusetts		–		0	–	4	–	0
Rhode Island		–		0	–	4	–	0

The 1896 Princeton Tigers football team was an American football team that represented Princeton University as an independent during the 1896 college football season. The team finished with a 10–0–1 record, shut out 10 of 12 opponents, and outscored all opponents by a total of 266 to 12. Franklin Morse was the head coach, and Garrett Cochran was the team captain.

There was no contemporaneous system in 1896 for determining a national champion. However, Princeton was retroactively named as the national champion by the Billingsley Report, Helms Athletic Foundation, and Houlgate System, and as a co-national champion with Lafayette by the National Championship Foundation (NCF) and Parke H. Davis. In head-to-head competition, Princeton and Lafayette played to a scoreless tie on October 7, 1896.

Four Princeton players were selected as consensus first-team players on the 1896 All-America team: halfback Addison Kelly; fullback John Baird; center Robert Gailey; and tackle William W. Church. Other notable players included quarterback F. L. Smith, halfback William Bannard, end Garrett Cochran, and guard Edward Crowdis.

== Schedule ==
Date	Time	Opponent	Site	Result	Attendance	Source
October 3		Rutgers	Princeton, NJ (rivalry)	W 44–0		
October 7		at Lafayette	March Field; Easton, PA	T 0–0	5,000	
October 10		Lehigh	Princeton, NJ	W 16–0		
October 14		Carlisle	Princeton, NJ	W 22–6		
October 17	3:20 p.m.	at Army	The Plain; West Point, NY	W 11–0	5,000	
October 21		Virginia	Princeton, NJ	W 48–0	> 6,000	
October 24		Penn State	Princeton, NJ	W 39–0	1,000	
October 26		Lawrenceville School	Princeton, NJ	W 46–0		
October 31		Cornell	Princeton, NJ	W 37–0	6,000	
November 7		at Harvard	Soldiers' Field; Boston, MA (rivalry)	W 12–0	20,000	
November 21		vs. Yale	Manhattan Field; New York, NY (rivalry)	W 24–6	35,000–50,000	

== Roster ==
- Armstrong, G
- John Baird, FB
- W. H. Bannard, HB
- Booth, T
- Brokaw, E
- William W. Church, T
- Garrett Cochran, E
- Samuel G. Craig
- Crowdis, C
- Big Bill Edwards, G
- Robert Gailey, C
- Geer, T
- Art Hillebrand, T
- Edgar Holt, G
- Addison Kelly, HB
- Pardee, HB
- Art Poe, QB
- Howard R. Reiter, HB
- Rosengarten, HB
- Schwartz, HB
- Smith, QB
- Billy Suter
- Thompson, E
- Albert Tyler, G
- Walter H. Watkins
- Art Wheeler, HB
