= Frank Carney =

Frank Carney may refer to:

- Frank Carney (American football), American football coach
- Frank Carney (playwright) (1902−1978), Irish playwright
- Frank Carney (politician) (1896−1932), Irish politician
- Frank Carney (1938−2020), American entrepreneur, founder of Pizza Hut, see Dan and Frank Carney
- Francis Patrick Carney (1846−1902), American politician
