= 1896 Yale Bulldogs football team =

American college football season

1896 Yale Bulldogs football
- Conference: Independent
- Record: 13–1
- Head coach: Sam Thorne (1st season)
- Captain: Fred T. Murphy
- Home stadium: Yale Field

1896 Eastern college football independents records
	Conf.			Overall
Team	W	L	T	W		L		T
Fordham		–		1	–	0	–	0
Lafayette		–		11	–	0	–	1
Princeton		–		10	–	0	–	1
Washington & Jefferson		–		8	–	0	–	1
Penn		–		14	–	1	–	0
Yale		–		13	–	1	–	0
Pittsburgh College		–		11	–	2	–	0
Buffalo		–		9	–	1	–	2
Villanova		–		10	–	4	–	0
Bucknell		–		5	–	2	–	1
Harvard		–		7	–	4	–	0
Boston College		–		5	–	3	–	0
Storrs		–		5	–	3	–	0
Cornell		–		5	–	3	–	1
Syracuse		–		5	–	3	–	2
Temple		–		3	–	2	–	0
Army		–		3	–	2	–	1
Rutgers		–		6	–	6	–	0
Carlisle		–		5	–	5	–	0
Holy Cross		–		2	–	2	–	2
Brown		–		4	–	5	–	1
Wesleyan		–		4	–	5	–	1
Dickinson		–		4	–	5	–	0
Franklin & Marshall		–		3	–	4	–	2
Geneva		–		3	–	4	–	0
Penn State		–		3	–	4	–	0
Colgate		–		3	–	4	–	1
Western Univ. Penn.		–		3	–	6	–	0
Lehigh		–		2	–	5	–	0
Tufts		–		2	–	6	–	1
Swarthmore		–		2	–	6	–	0
New Hampshire		–		1	–	4	–	0
Drexel		–		1	–	5	–	0
Massachusetts		–		0	–	4	–	0
Rhode Island		–		0	–	4	–	0

The 1896 Yale Bulldogs football team represented Yale University in the 1896 college football season. The Bulldogs finished with a 13–1 record under first-year head coach Sam Thorne. The team recorded nine shutouts and won its first 13 games by a combined 212 to 29 score. It then lost its final game against rival Princeton by a 24–6 score.

Two Yale players, quarterback Clarence Fincke and tackle Fred T. Murphy, were consensus picks for the 1896 College Football All-America Team. Leslie's Weekly also picked three other Yale players (ends Lyman Bass and Louis Hinkey and center Burr Chamberlain) as 1896 first-team All-America players.

== Schedule ==
Date	Opponent	Site	Result	Attendance	Source
September 26	at Trinity (CT)	Hartford, CT	W 6–0		
September 30	Amherst	Yale Field; New Haven, CT	W 12–0		
October 7	Brown	Yale Field; New Haven, CT	W 18–0	1,800	
October 10	vs. Orange Athletic Club	Orange Oval; Orange, NJ	W 12–0	1,000	
October 14	Williams	Yale Field; New Haven, CT	W 22–0		
October 17	Dartmouth	Yale Field; New Haven, CT	W 42–0		
October 21	Wesleyan	Yale Field; New Haven, CT	W 16–0		
October 24	vs. Carlisle	Manattan Field; New York, NY	W 12–6	5,000	
October 28	Elizabeth Athletic Club	Yale Field; New Haven, CT	W 12–6		
October 31	at Army	Parade grounds; West Point, NY	W 16–2		
November 3	Boston Athletic Association	Yale Field; New Haven, CT	W 10–0	2,500	
November 7	at Brown	Adelaide Park; Providence, RI	W 18–6	2,500	
November 14	New Jersey Athletic Club	Yale Field; New Haven, CT	W 16–0		
November 21	Princeton	Manhattan Field; New York, NY (rivalry)	L 6–24	35,000–50,000	

== Roster ==
- Abbott, T
- Alport, T
- Lyman M. Bass, E
- Hamilton F. Benjamin, HB
- Butler, FB
- Charles Chadwick, G
- Burr Chamberlain, C
- George S. Chauncey, FB
- W. Boudinot Conner, E
- Drummond, G
- Alfred H. Durston
- Morris Ely, QB
- Clarence Fincke, QB
- Gerard, QB
- Gilmore, HB
- Goodwin, HB
- John A. Hall
- Josiah J. Hazen, E
- Alfred H. Hine
- Louis Hinkey, FB
- King, HB
- Alexander B. Marvin
- John S. McFarland, C
- Paul D. Mills, HB
- Morris, G
- Fred T. Murphy, T
- Lang Murray, G
- Post, T
- James O. Rodgers, T
- Dudley Sutphin, G
- Leonard H. Van Every, HB
- Wright, HB
