= 1896 Western University of Pennsylvania football team =

American college football season

1896 Western University of Pennsylvania football
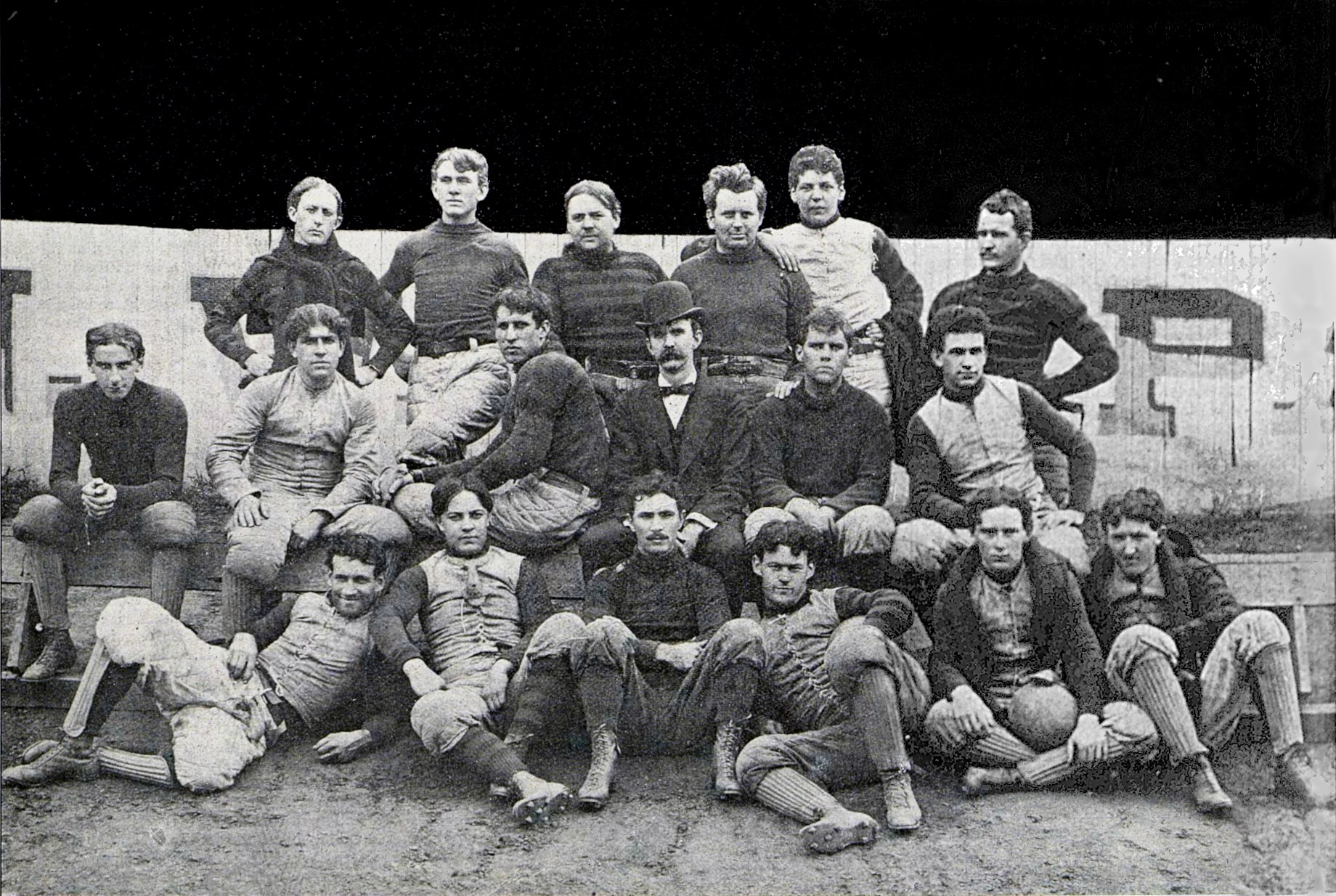
- The 1896 football team
- Conference: Independent
- Record: 2–7
- Head coach: George W. Hoskins (1st season)

1896 Eastern college football independents records
	Conf.			Overall
Team	W	L	T	W		L		T
Fordham		–		1	–	0	–	0
Lafayette		–		11	–	0	–	1
Princeton		–		10	–	0	–	1
Washington & Jefferson		–		8	–	0	–	1
Penn		–		14	–	1	–	0
Yale		–		13	–	1	–	0
Pittsburgh College		–		11	–	2	–	0
Buffalo		–		9	–	1	–	2
Villanova		–		10	–	4	–	0
Bucknell		–		5	–	2	–	1
Harvard		–		7	–	4	–	0
Boston College		–		5	–	3	–	0
Storrs		–		5	–	3	–	0
Cornell		–		5	–	3	–	1
Syracuse		–		5	–	3	–	2
Temple		–		3	–	2	–	0
Army		–		3	–	2	–	1
Rutgers		–		6	–	6	–	0
Carlisle		–		5	–	5	–	0
Holy Cross		–		2	–	2	–	2
Brown		–		4	–	5	–	1
Wesleyan		–		4	–	5	–	1
Dickinson		–		4	–	5	–	0
Franklin & Marshall		–		3	–	4	–	2
Geneva		–		3	–	4	–	0
Penn State		–		3	–	4	–	0
Colgate		–		3	–	4	–	1
Western Univ. Penn.		–		3	–	6	–	0
Lehigh		–		2	–	5	–	0
Tufts		–		2	–	6	–	1
Swarthmore		–		2	–	6	–	0
New Hampshire		–		1	–	4	–	0
Drexel		–		1	–	5	–	0
Massachusetts		–		0	–	4	–	0
Rhode Island		–		0	–	4	–	0

The 1896 Western University of Pennsylvania football team was an American football team that represented the Western University of Pennsylvania (now known as the University of Pittsburgh) as an independent during the 1896 college football season.

== Schedule ==
Date	Opponent	Site	Result	Attendance	Source
September 26	at Pittsburgh Athletic Club	P.A.C. Park; Pittsburgh, PA	L 4–6	500	
October 3	at Penn State	Beaver Field; State College, PA (rivalry)	L 4–10		
October 10	at Latrobe Athletic Association	Latrobe, PA	L 0–4		
October 16	at Washington & Jefferson	Washington, PA	cancelled		
October 24	Duquesne Country and Athletic Club	Exposition Park; Allegheny, PA	L 0–26	1,000	
October 30	Western Theological Seminary	Exposition Park; Allegheny, PA	L 0–6 (forfeit)		
November 14	at Geneva	Geneva Park; Beaver Falls, PA	W 6–0 (forfeit)		
November 21	at Sewickley AA	Sewickley, PA	W 18–0		
November 26	at Wheeling Tigers	Wheeling, WV	L 6–11	1,500	
November 28	at Grove City	Grove City, PA	L 0–12	1,000	

== Season recap ==
On June 15, 1896, the Western University of Pennsylvania board of trustees elected George W. Hoskins to the chair of physical culture. Hoskins was previously the head coach at Pennsylvania State College from 1892 to 1895 and compiled a 17–4–4 record. His unique style of coaching introduced after practice critiquing sessions with blackboard chalk talks, and giving quizzes about the new rule changes for the upcoming season. There were a host of applicants for team positions, and practice was mandatory unless the coach received a legitimate excuse. In its first and only season under head coach George W. Hoskins, the team compiled a 2-7 record and was outscored by a total of 69 to 42.

== Game summaries ==
=== At Pittsburgh Athletic Club ===
WUP at Pittsburgh Athletic Club

Team	1	2	Total
WUP	0	4	4
• P.A.C.	0	6	6

- Date: September 26, 1896
- Location: P.A.C. Park
  Pittsburgh
- Game attendance: 500+
- Referee: O. D. Thompson

The George Hoskins led WUP eleven opened the season on Saturday, September 26 against the Pittsburgh Athletic Club (PAC) on the East End Grounds. The first half was scoreless with both teams struggling to sustain their offense. Coach Hoskins played center and did a lot of punting. Weakley, Donaldson and Shaler did the bulk of the ball carrying for the WUP. At the end of the half Atherton of PAC tried a 40 yard field goal but it sailed wide. Five minutes into the second half, the PAC offense methodically advanced the ball down the field and Bushman carried it over the goal line for the first touchdown of the game. Atherton kicked the goal after and PAC led 6–0. The WUP offense then moved down the field to the PAC five yard line and Hoskins tried an onside kick but Aull of PAC recovered. The WUP defense held PAC from scoring again and finally got the ball back with a minute left. The WUP offense was able to move the ball to the 25 yard line and Hoskins tried another onside kick from there. Weakley of the WUP recovered it in the end zone for the touchdown. Kirkpatrick missed the goal after and the final score was 6–4 in favor of PAC.

The WUP starting lineup for the P.A.C. game was Al Marshall (left end), Williams (left tackle), Charles Burheim (left guard), George Hoskins (center), Smith (right guard), Edgar Guilford (right tackle), Jay Henry (right end), William Shaler (quarterback), Donaldson (left halfback), Weakley (right halfback) and Kirkpatrick (fullback).

=== At Penn State ===
WUP at Penn State

Team	1	2	Total
WUP	0	4	4
• Penn State	4	6	10

- Date: October 3, 1896
- Location: Beaver Stadium
  Bellefonte, PA
- Referee: Payne

On October 3, the WUP eleven made their second trip to Beaver Stadium to take on State College. The WUP defense played an excellent game, but J. A. Dunsmore of State College was able to scamper twenty yards around the end for a touchdown near the end of the first half. Clarence Thompson, State's kicker, missed the goal after and the score stood 4–0 at halftime. The second half was shortened to fifteen minutes. State received the ball first and the WUP defense held. State College attempted to punt but the WUP defense blocked the kick. Left end Al Marshall recovered the ball in the end zone for a WUP touchdown. Quarterback William Shaler missed the goal after. The State College offense then sustained a fifty yard drive culminating with another touchdown by Dunsmore. Ensminger's try for goal after was successful. The WUP offense proceeded to move the ball into State territory and tried an unsuccessful late field goal. The final score was 10–4 in favor of State College.

The WUP starting lineup for the Penn State game was Al Marshall (left end), Williams (left tackle), Charles Burheim (left guard), George Hoskins (center), Smith (right guard), Edgar Guilford (right tackle), Jay Henry (right end), William Shaler (quarterback), Donaldson (left halfback), Weakley (right halfback) and Kirkpatrick (fullback).

=== At Latrobe Athletic Association ===
WUP at Latrobe A. A.

Team	1	2	Total
WUP	0	0	0
• Latrobe A. A.	0	4	4

- Date: October 10, 1896
- Location: Latrobe A.A. Grounds
  Latrobe, PA
- Referee: Payne

The next game on the schedule was against the Latrobe Athletic Association in Latrobe, Pa. on October 10. Early in the first half the referee called a play by Latrobe illegal and a squabble ensued for close to an hour. Finally, the WUP team decided to play ball and the first half ended scoreless. After halftime Latrobe's offense controlled the game, but the stingy WUP defense held them to one touchdown. The WUP offense was unable to generate much rushing yardage and they lost the game 4–0.

The WUP starting lineup for the Latrobe game was Al Marshall (right end), Williams (right tackle), Charles Burheim (right guard), George Hoskins (center), Smith (left guard), Edgar Guilford (left tackle), Jay Henry (left end), William Shaler (quarterback), Donaldson (right halfback), Weakley (left halfback) and Kirkpatrick (fullback).

=== At Washington & Jefferson (cancelled) ===
On October 16, Chancellor William Jacob Holland wrote a letter to coach Hoskins with his concern about the number of injured WUP players. He prohibited the team from competing until they were fully healed. Coach Hoskins had to cancel the Washington & Jefferson game scheduled for the 17th, but he felt that the team would be ready for the D.C. & A.C. game on the 24th. The letter from the Chancellor stated:

"I am informed that a large number of the gentlemen composing the football team of the university have recently in games in which they have played sustained serious injury, which incapacitate them from playing. I have had no opportunity to consult you, but my information is such as to convince me that it would be very prejudicial to the health and perhaps perilous to some of these young men in their present condition to undertake to play a match game. My jurisdiction authorizes me, as the custodian of the physical as well as the intellectual interests of the young men in the institution, therefore, to decide that it is improper that these men should enter for the present into any contest which is likely to result in further and possibly permanent injury. Acting, therefore, with the advice and consent of my colleagues of the faculty, I desire to notify you that the football team will notbe allowed to play any game until the gentlemen who compose that team are restored to health. I further desire to notify you that it is the sense of the faculty of this institution that the so-called "scrub" teams of this university shall be pitted only against "scrub" teams of other institutions. We do not think it is just to our young men that beginners should be brought into competition with veterans in this sort of sport. The percentage of injuries which is likely to result from such an unequal mating of the contending forces on the football team is sufficient, in my judgement, to warrant our faculty in prohibiting contests of this sort."

=== At Duquesne Country and Athletic Club ===
WUP at D.C. & A.C.

Team	1	2	Total
WUP	0	0	0
• D.C. & A.C.	14	12	26

- Date: October 24, 1896
- Location: Exposition Park
  Pittsburgh
- Game attendance: 1,000
- Referee: E.F. Brainard

On October 24, at Exposition Park the Duquesne Country and Athletic Club (D.C. & A.C.) football team easily defeated the eleven from the Western University 26–0 in front of one thousand spectators. The WUP starting lineup had three new members – Burtt, McConkey and Riley. Halfback Ed Brown of the D.C. & A.C. notched an eight yard touchdown run on the A.C.'s first offensive possession. Young kicked the goal after and the score was 6–0 after three minutes. The WUP offense failed to move the ball. D.C. & A.C. halfback Ed Brown raced thirty-five yards for his second score. Later in the half, Young of the D.C. & A.C. plunged into the end zone from the six inch line. The score at halftime read 14–0 in favor of D.C. & A.C. The second half started like the first, as right tackle Johnson of D.C. & A.C. raced forty-five yards for a touchdown on their opening possession. On their next possession halfback Lowrey sped sixty yards for the final score of the game.

The revised WUP starting lineup for the D.C. & A.C. game was Walter Burtt (left end), Williams (left tackle), Charles Burheim (right guard), George Hoskins (center), McConkey (left guard), Edgar Guilford (right tackle), Jay Henry (right end), William Shaler (quarterback), Donaldson (left halfback), Weakley (fullback) and Riley (right halfback).

=== Western Theological Seminary ===
Allegheny A.C. at WUP

Team	1	2	Total
• Allegheny A. C.	6	0	6
WUP	0	0	0

- Date: October 30, 1896
- Location: Exposition Park
  Pittsburgh
- Referee: O. D. Thompson

The October 30 game with the Western Theological Seminary (also known as Allegheny Athletic Club) was summed up best by the reporter for The Pittsburgh Press:

"The W.U.P. - Allegheny Athletic club football game at Exposition park yesterday afternoon ended by W.U.P. leaving the field after a heated wrangle over the ruling of the officials, who by the way did not agree, but both claimed the authority to rule on the play. The trouble arose in the first half, 22 minutes after play had begun. W.U.P. had worked the ball to within seven yards of the Theologians goal. Here a quarterback kick was worked. The ball bounded over the goal line and WUP end Henry dropped on it for a touchdown. Referee O. D. Thompson promptly ruled Henry guilty of being off-side on the play and refused to allow the touchdown. Umpire S. M. Kintner decided that Henry was not guilty, and the wrangle began. Mr. Thompson firmly refused to allow the touchdown. Coach Hoskins called the players together and they left the field, forfeiting the game to the Theological students – 6–0."

The Pitt media guide lists this game as a 4-0 win.

The WUP starting lineup for the game with Allegheny A.C. was Walter Burtt (left end), Williams (left tackle), Charles Burheim (right guard), George Hoskins (center), McConkey (left guard), Edgar Guilford (right tackle), Jay Henry (right end), William Shaler (quarterback), Donaldson (left halfback), Weakley (right halfback) and Kier (fullback).

=== At Geneva ===
WUP at Geneva

Team	1	2	Total
• WUP	6	0	6
Geneva	0	0	0

- Date: November 14, 1896
- Location: Beaver Fairgrounds
  Beaver Falls, PA
- Referee: Harry C. Fry

On November 14, the W.U.P. eleven's propensity to stir up trouble resumed at Beaver Falls against Geneva College. The Pittsburg Press on November 6 reported that coach Hoskins would be the new coach of the Pittsburgh Athletic Club team. Then on November 11 coach Hoskins played for the P.A.C. against the Allegheny Athletic Association. So, when the WUP team took the field in Geneva and coach Hoskins was in his usual position at center the Geneva eleven refused to play. They felt he was now a professional and no longer eligible to compete on the intercollegiate level. The referee ordered the teams to line up and play. Geneva did not touch the pigskin. The allotted time ran out and the WUP was named the winner by forfeit.

The WUP lineup for the game with Geneva was Al Marshall (left end), Williams (left tackle), Charles Burheim (left guard), George Hoskins (center), McConkey (right guard), Edgar Guilford (right tackle), Jay Henry (right end), William Shaler (quarterback), Donaldson (left halfback), Weakley (fullback) and Johnston (right halfback).

=== At Sewickley Athletic Association ===
On November 21, the game with the Sewickley Athletic Association was free from controversy. However, the eleven from Sewickley, Pennsylvania played a better game than the spectators anticipated. The WUP team outweighed Sewickley by 25 pounds per man and subsequently proved to be the better team. Weakley, Donaldson, Burheim and Marshall all scored touchdowns for the WUP and Guilford was good on one goal after to make the final score 18–0.

The WUP lineup for the game against Sewickley A. C. was Al Marshall (left end), Williams (left tackle), Jesse Kaufman (left guard), Charles Burheim (center), McConkey (right guard), Edgar Guilford (right tackle), Jay Henry (right end), William Shaler (quarterback), Donaldson (left halfback), Weakley (right halfback) and Kirkpatrick (fullback).

=== At Wheeling Tigers ===
WUP at Wheeling Tigers

Team	1	2	Total
WUP	6	0	6
• Wheeling	5	6	11

- Date: November 26, 1896
- Location: Inter-state baseball grounds
  Wheeling, WV
- Game attendance: 1,000
- Referee: E.E. Mayer (Pittsburgh)

Controversy reappeared for the November 26 Thanksgiving day tussle between the Western University and the Wheeling Tigers in Wheeling, West Virginia on the Island baseball fields. The Pittsburgh Daily Post summarized the argument - “The game of football between the Western University of Pennsylvania and the Wheeling Tigers, which was witnessed by 1,500 people, was one continuous wrangle, and the game was not finished until after dark. Both sides claim the victory. Touchdown and goal of the Tigers in the second half are in dispute. The trouble was due to a misunderstanding between the umpire and the referee regarding their respective privileges and duties, and their evident desire to favor their own teams. W.U.P. quit once, but this action brought forth general hissing and expressions of indignation and they finished the game.” The Wheeling Daily Intelligencer gave a detailed account of the proceedings. In the first half both teams played well on defense and ball possession changed back and forth. The Tigers recovered an onside kick and their offense moved the ball close to the WUP goal. The WUP defense stiffened and Tiger captain Robert Edwards drop-kicked a goal and the Tigers led 5–0. A punting duel ensued. WUP halfback Donaldson was injured and time was called. Then the Tiger offense started to advance the pigskin. Robert Edwards scampered around the end but fumbled into the hands of WUP end Marshall, who raced down the sideline seventy yards for the touchdown. Guilford's goal after was successful and the score read 6–5 in favor of the Western University. The Tigers were able to again move the ball near the WUP goal before halftime. The second half started with the usual back and forth possessions until Guilford of the WUP was penalized for a tackle below the knee. The WUP team was not happy with the umpire, Mr. Charles Williams, and words were exchanged. When play resumed Robert Edwards was literally pushed over the goal with a mighty effort that left him injured. Sweeney kicked the goal after and the final score was 11–6 in favor of the Tigers.

The WUP starting lineup for the game against Wheeling was Al Marshall (left end), Williams (left tackle), Gruff (left guard), Jesse Kaufman (center), Charles Burheim (right guard), Edgar Guilford (right tackle), Jay Henry (right end), William Shaler (quarterback), Donaldson (left halfback), Weakley (right halfback) and Kirkpatrick (fullback).

=== At Grove City ===
WUP at Grove City

Team	1	2	Total
WUP	0	0	0
• Grove City	6	6	12

- Date: November 28, 1896
- Location: Grove City Grounds
  Grove City, PA
- Referee: Prof. James

On a muddy November 28, two days after the tough loss to Wheeling, the WUP eleven closed their season at Grove City, Pa with a game against Grove City College. Six minutes into the first half fullback Craig of Grove City scored a touchdown. Shannon kicked the goal after and the score remained 6–0 in favor of Grove City for the rest of the half. In the second stanza halfback Brandon was able to break loose on a thirty yard touchdown jaunt for Grove City. Shannon again was successful with the goal kick after. The WUP offense could not sustain a drive and time expired with Grove City again deep in WUP territory. The final score read 12–0 in favor of Grove City.

The WUP lineup for the final game of the season was Al Marshall (left end), Williams (left tackle), Charles Burheim (left guard), Jesse Kaufman (center), McConkey (right guard), Edgar Guilford (right tackle), Jay Henry (right end), William Shaler (quarterback), John Kennihan (left halfback), Judd Bruff (right halfback) and Weakley (fullback).

== Roster ==
The roster of the 1896 Western University of Pennsylvania football team:

- Edgar Guilford (right tackle/Team Captain) He received his Doctor of Medicine degree in 1899 and lived in Waterbury, Connecticut.
- A. A. Marshall (left end) received his Bachelor of Philosophy degree in 1894 and was in the Law School class of 1897. He previously played football for the Allegheny Athletic Association.
- Williams (left tackle) was a member of the class of 1900 in the Collegiate Department.
- Charles George Burheim (left guard) received his Doctor of Medicine degree in 1899.
- Jesse Kaufman (center) received his associate degree from the college in 1900. He lived in McWhorter, West Virginia.
- McConkey (right guard) was a member of the class of 1899 in the Law School. He had played football at both the University of Michigan and Grove City College prior to entering WUP.
- Jay Henry (right end) originally played football at the University of Notre Dame then enrolled at WUP for medical school. He earned his Doctor of Medicine degree in 1899.
- Donaldson (left halfback) was a member of the class of 1900 in the Collegiate Department. He played football at The Kiski School prior to entering WUP.
- Weakley (right halfback) was a member of the class of 1899 in the Medical Department. He previously played football at Grove City College.
- Kirkpatrick (fullback) was a member of the class of 1899 in the Collegiate Department.
- William Shaler (quarterback) was a member of the class of 1898 in the Collegiate Department.
- Walter Burtt (substitute lineman) received his Associate Engineering degree in 1896. He previously played football at Adrian College (Mich.).
- John Kennihan (substitute halfback) received his Doctor of Medicine degree in 1900. He lived in Sharpsburg, Pennsylvania.
- William Alexander (substitute) received his Associate College degree in 1896. He lived in Pittsburgh, Pa.
- Judd Bruff (substitute guard) earned his Associate College degree in 1899 and resided in Pittsburgh, Pa.
- S. M. Kier (fullback) earned his Electrical Engineering degree in 1898.
- Edwin "Ned" Johnston (left end) earned his Mechanical Engineering degree in 1897 and lived in Canonsburg, Pennsylvania.
- Albert Riley (end) received his Mechanical Engineering degree in 1898 and resided in Canonsburg, Pa.
- Smith (right guard)

== Coaching staff ==
- George W. Hoskins (coach/center) previously played football and coached at Pennsylvania State College.
- F. W. Miller (team manager) received his Bachelor of Arts and Masters of Arts degrees in 1897 followed by a Bachelor of Laws in 1900. He lived in Pittsburgh, Pennsylvania.
