= 1896 Lafayette football team =

American college football season

1896 Lafayette football
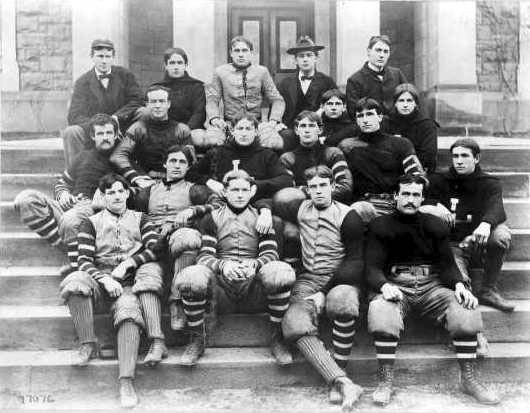

Co-national champion (NCF, Davis)
- Conference: Independent
- Record: 11–0–1
- Head coach: Parke H. Davis (2nd season)
- Captain: George Waldbridge
- Home stadium: Lafayette Field

1896 Eastern college football independents records
	Conf.			Overall
Team	W	L	T	W		L		T
Fordham		–		1	–	0	–	0
Lafayette		–		11	–	0	–	1
Princeton		–		10	–	0	–	1
Washington & Jefferson		–		8	–	0	–	1
Penn		–		14	–	1	–	0
Yale		–		13	–	1	–	0
Pittsburgh College		–		11	–	2	–	0
Buffalo		–		9	–	1	–	2
Villanova		–		10	–	4	–	0
Bucknell		–		5	–	2	–	1
Harvard		–		7	–	4	–	0
Boston College		–		5	–	3	–	0
Storrs		–		5	–	3	–	0
Cornell		–		5	–	3	–	1
Syracuse		–		5	–	3	–	2
Temple		–		3	–	2	–	0
Army		–		3	–	2	–	1
Rutgers		–		6	–	6	–	0
Carlisle		–		5	–	5	–	0
Holy Cross		–		2	–	2	–	2
Brown		–		4	–	5	–	1
Wesleyan		–		4	–	5	–	1
Dickinson		–		4	–	5	–	0
Franklin & Marshall		–		3	–	4	–	2
Geneva		–		3	–	4	–	0
Penn State		–		3	–	4	–	0
Colgate		–		3	–	4	–	1
Western Univ. Penn.		–		3	–	6	–	0
Lehigh		–		2	–	5	–	0
Tufts		–		2	–	6	–	1
Swarthmore		–		2	–	6	–	0
New Hampshire		–		1	–	4	–	0
Drexel		–		1	–	5	–	0
Massachusetts		–		0	–	4	–	0
Rhode Island		–		0	–	4	–	0

The 1896 Lafayette football team was an American football team that represented Lafayette College of Easton, Pennsylvania, as an independent during the 1896 college football season. In their second season under head coach Parke H. Davis, Lafayette compiled an 11–0–1 record, shut out 10 of 12 opponents, and outscored all opponents by a total of 240 to 10. The team was retroactively selected as the co-national champion by the National Championship Foundation and the team's own head coach, Davis, in his later role as a football historian.

Lafayette played a scoreless tie with Princeton in the second game of the year and defeated West Virginia three times in three days by a combined score of 56–0. On October 24, Lafayette defeated Penn, 6–4, breaking the Quakers' 34-game winning streak. Lafayette closed its season with an 18–6 win over Navy.

Notable players on the team included:

- Tackle Fielding H. Yost began the season playing for West Virginia and then joined Lafayette for its game against Penn. He later served as the head football coach at Michigan from 1901 to 1926.
- Guard Charles Rinehart, 6'1", 243 pounds, was described as "the life, genius and inspiration" of the team with muscles "as strong as bands of steel".
- Halfback George Barclay. Lehigh refused to play its annual rivalry game with Lehigh in protest over Barclay's eligibility and amateur status. Barclay allegedly played professional baseball the previous summer.

== Schedule ==
Date	Opponent	Site	Result	Attendance	Source
September 26	Volunteer Athletic Club of New York City	Lafayette Field; Easton, PA	W 44–0		
October 7	Princeton	Lafayette Field; Easton, PA	T 0–0	5,000	
October 15	vs. West Virginia	Fairmont, WV	W 18–0	1,600	
October 16	vs. West Virginia	Parkersburg, WV	W 6–0		
October 17	vs. West Virginia	Wheeling, WV	W 34–0		
October 24	at Penn	Franklin Field; Philadelphia, PA	W 6–4	13,000	
October 31	Dickinson	Lafayette Field; Easton, PA	W 18–0		
November 10	at Bloomsburg Normal	Normal Field; Bloomsburg, PA	W 17–0		
November 11	at Wyoming Seminary	Kingston, PA	W 23–0	600	
November 14	Franklin & Marshall	Lafayette Field; Easton, PA	W 38–0		
November 21	Wesleyan	Lafayette Field; Easton, PA	W 18–0		
November 26	at Navy	Worden Field; Annapolis, MD	W 18–6	1,800	
