= 1896 Penn Quakers football team =

American college football season

1896 Penn Quakers football
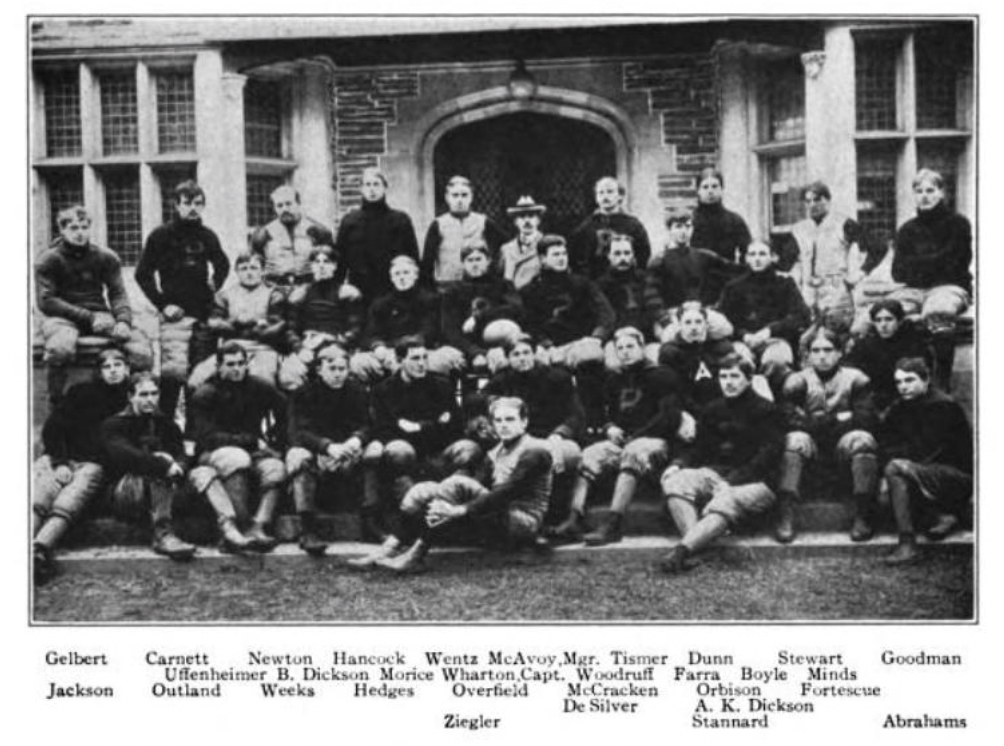
- Conference: Independent
- Record: 14–1
- Head coach: George Washington Woodruff (5th season)
- Captain: Charles Wharton
- Home stadium: Franklin Field

1896 Eastern college football independents records
	Conf.			Overall
Team	W	L	T	W		L		T
Fordham		–		1	–	0	–	0
Lafayette		–		11	–	0	–	1
Princeton		–		10	–	0	–	1
Washington & Jefferson		–		8	–	0	–	1
Penn		–		14	–	1	–	0
Yale		–		13	–	1	–	0
Pittsburgh College		–		11	–	2	–	0
Buffalo		–		9	–	1	–	2
Villanova		–		10	–	4	–	0
Bucknell		–		5	–	2	–	1
Harvard		–		7	–	4	–	0
Boston College		–		5	–	3	–	0
Storrs		–		5	–	3	–	0
Cornell		–		5	–	3	–	1
Syracuse		–		5	–	3	–	2
Temple		–		3	–	2	–	0
Army		–		3	–	2	–	1
Rutgers		–		6	–	6	–	0
Carlisle		–		5	–	5	–	0
Holy Cross		–		2	–	2	–	2
Brown		–		4	–	5	–	1
Wesleyan		–		4	–	5	–	1
Dickinson		–		4	–	5	–	0
Franklin & Marshall		–		3	–	4	–	2
Geneva		–		3	–	4	–	0
Penn State		–		3	–	4	–	0
Colgate		–		3	–	4	–	1
Western Univ. Penn.		–		3	–	6	–	0
Lehigh		–		2	–	5	–	0
Tufts		–		2	–	6	–	1
Swarthmore		–		2	–	6	–	0
New Hampshire		–		1	–	4	–	0
Drexel		–		1	–	5	–	0
Massachusetts		–		0	–	4	–	0
Rhode Island		–		0	–	4	–	0

The 1896 Penn Quakers football team represented the University of Pennsylvania in the 1896 college football season. The Quakers finished with a 14–1 record in their fifth year under head coach and College Football Hall of Fame inductee, George Washington Woodruff. Significant games included victories over Navy (8–0), Carlisle (21–0), Penn State (27–0), Harvard (8–6), and Cornell (32–10), and its sole loss against undefeated national champion Lafayette (6–4). The 1896 Penn team outscored its opponents by a combined total of 326 to 24.

Five Penn players received recognition on the 1896 College Football All-America Team: end Charlie Gelbert (consensus 1st team); guards Charles Wharton (consensus 1st team), Wylie G. Woodruff (consensus 1st team), and L. J. Uffenheimer (Leslie's Weekly, 2nd team); and fullback John Minds (Philadelphia Inquirer, 1st team).

== Schedule ==
Date	Time	Opponent	Site	Result	Attendance	Source
September 26		at Franklin & Marshall	Lancaster, PA	W 24–0		
September 30		Gettysburg	Franklin Field; Philadelphia, PA	W 32–0	1,500	
October 3		Bucknell	Franklin Field; Philadelphia, PA	W 40–0	2,500	
October 7		at Navy	Worden Field; Annapolis, MD	W 8–0		
October 10	3:37 p.m.	Dartmouth	Franklin Field; Philadelphia, PA	W 16–0	4,000	
October 14		Virginia	Franklin Field; Philadelphia, PA	W 20–0		
October 17		Lehigh	Franklin Field; Philadelphia, PA	W 34–0		
October 21		Amherst	Franklin Field; Philadelphia, PA	W 14–0	800–2,000	
October 24		Lafayette	Franklin Field; Philadelphia, PA	L 4–6	13,000	
October 28		Brown	Franklin Field; Philadelphia, PA	W 16–0	4,500	
November 3		Dickinson	Franklin Field; Philadelphia, PA	W 30–2	3,000	
November 7		Carlisle	Franklin Field; Philadelphia, PA	W 21–0		
November 14		Penn State	Franklin Field; Philadelphia, PA	W 27–0		
November 21		Harvard	Franklin Field; Philadelphia, PA (rivalry)	W 8–6		
November 26		Cornell	Franklin Field; Philadelphia, PA (rivalry)	W 32–10		
