= Frank Carney (American football) =

American football player and coach

Playing career
- 1894–1895: Boston College

Coaching career (HC unless noted)
- 1896: Boston College

Head coaching record
- Overall: 5–2

Frank Carney was an American college football player and coach. He was the fourth head football coach at Boston College, serving for one season, in 1896, and compiling a record of 5–2. His five wins included a victory over Holy Cross and a season-finale defeat of cross-town rival Boston University. Carney played for Boston College in 1894 and 1895. His hometown was Cambridgeport, Massachusetts.

== Head coaching record ==
Year	Team	Overall	Conference	Standing	Bowl/playoffs
Boston College (Independent) (1896)
1896	Boston College	5–2			
Boston College:		5–2			
Total:		5–2			
