= 1896 Carlisle Indians football team =

American college football season

1896 Carlisle Indians football
- Conference: Independent
- Record: 5–5
- Head coach: Bill Hickok (1st season)
- Captain: Bemus Pierce

1896 Eastern college football independents records
| | Conf. | | | Overall |
| Team | W | L | T | W | | L | | T |
|---|---|---|---|---|---|---|---|---|
| Fordham | | – | | 1 | – | 0 | – | 0 |
| Lafayette | | – | | 11 | – | 0 | – | 1 |
| Princeton | | – | | 10 | – | 0 | – | 1 |
| Washington & Jefferson | | – | | 8 | – | 0 | – | 1 |
| Penn | | – | | 14 | – | 1 | – | 0 |
| Yale | | – | | 13 | – | 1 | – | 0 |
| Pittsburgh College | | – | | 11 | – | 2 | – | 0 |
| Buffalo | | – | | 9 | – | 1 | – | 2 |
| Villanova | | – | | 10 | – | 4 | – | 0 |
| Bucknell | | – | | 5 | – | 2 | – | 1 |
| Harvard | | – | | 7 | – | 4 | – | 0 |
| Boston College | | – | | 5 | – | 3 | – | 0 |
| Storrs | | – | | 5 | – | 3 | – | 0 |
| Cornell | | – | | 5 | – | 3 | – | 1 |
| Syracuse | | – | | 5 | – | 3 | – | 2 |
| Temple | | – | | 3 | – | 2 | – | 0 |
| Army | | – | | 3 | – | 2 | – | 1 |
| Rutgers | | – | | 6 | – | 6 | – | 0 |
| Carlisle | | – | | 5 | – | 5 | – | 0 |
| Holy Cross | | – | | 2 | – | 2 | – | 2 |
| Brown | | – | | 4 | – | 5 | – | 1 |
| Wesleyan | | – | | 4 | – | 5 | – | 1 |
| Dickinson | | – | | 4 | – | 5 | – | 0 |
| Franklin & Marshall | | – | | 3 | – | 4 | – | 2 |
| Geneva | | – | | 3 | – | 4 | – | 0 |
| Penn State | | – | | 3 | – | 4 | – | 0 |
| Colgate | | – | | 3 | – | 4 | – | 1 |
| Amherst | | – | | 3 | – | 6 | – | 1 |
| Western Univ. Penn. | | – | | 3 | – | 6 | – | 0 |
| Lehigh | | – | | 2 | – | 5 | – | 0 |
| Tufts | | – | | 2 | – | 6 | – | 1 |
| Swarthmore | | – | | 2 | – | 6 | – | 0 |
| New Hampshire | | – | | 1 | – | 4 | – | 0 |
| Drexel | | – | | 1 | – | 5 | – | 0 |
| Massachusetts | | – | | 0 | – | 4 | – | 0 |
| Rhode Island | | – | | 0 | – | 4 | – | 0 |

The 1896 Carlisle Indians football team represented the Carlisle Indian Industrial School as an independent during the 1896 college football season. Led by Bill Hickok in his first and only season as head coach, the team compiled a record of 5–5 and outscored opponents 164 to 102.

Carlisle played games against college football's "Big Four" (Harvard, Yale, Princeton, and Penn) and nearly defeated Yale. The New York Times reported on a run by Isaac Seneca that nearly won the game against Yale:

"Seneca was given the ball to go through the centre. He got through with one or two Yale men hanging on to him. Then he squirmed and shook off the Yale men, dodged a man or two, and, making a splendid run down the field, made what was thought to be a touchdown. Nearly all on the grounds shouted themselves hoarse. Men waved their hats in the air, pretty gals clapped their hands ..."

However, the referee waved off the touchdown, ruling that Seneca was "down" when the Yale players hung on to him. The New York Times wrote the next day that the referee had made the wrong call and that Carlisle had been robbed of a touchdown, but the game went into the record books as a 12–6 win for Yale.

== Schedule ==
| Date | Time | Opponent | Site | Result | Attendance | Source |
|---|---|---|---|---|---|---|
| September 26 | 3:00 p.m. | vs. Dickinson | Carlisle, PA | W 28–6 | | |
| October 3 | | at Duquesne Country and Athletic Club | Exposition Park; Allegheny, PA | W 18–0 | 2,000 | |
| October 14 | | at Princeton | Osborne Field; Princeton, NJ | L 6–22 | | |
| October 24 | | vs. Yale | Manattan Field; New York, NY | L 6–12 | 5,000 | |
| October 31 | 3:00 p.m. | at Harvard | Soldiers' Field; Boston, MA | L 0–4 | 12,000 | |
| November 7 | | at Penn | Franklin Field; Philadelphia, PA | L 0–21 | | |
| November 14 | | at Cincinnati | League Park; Cincinnati, OH | W 28–0 | 5,000 | |
| November 21 | | vs. Penn State | Sixth Street gridiron; Harrisburg, PA | W 48–5 | 2,000 | |
| November 26 | | vs. Brown | Manhattan Field; New York, NY | L 12–24 | 15,000–18,000 | |
| December 19 | 8:00 p.m. | vs. Wisconsin | Chicago Coliseum; Chicago, IL | W 18–8 | 16,000 | |
