= 1896 Syracuse Orangemen football team =

American college football season

1896 Syracuse Orangemen football
- Conference: Independent
- Record: 5–3–2
- Head coach: George O. Redington (2nd season)
- Captain: Robert Adams
- Home stadium: Old Oval

1896 Eastern college football independents records
	Conf.			Overall
Team	W	L	T	W		L		T
Fordham		–		1	–	0	–	0
Lafayette		–		11	–	0	–	1
Princeton		–		10	–	0	–	1
Washington & Jefferson		–		8	–	0	–	1
Penn		–		14	–	1	–	0
Yale		–		13	–	1	–	0
Pittsburgh College		–		11	–	2	–	0
Buffalo		–		9	–	1	–	2
Villanova		–		10	–	4	–	0
Bucknell		–		5	–	2	–	1
Harvard		–		7	–	4	–	0
Boston College		–		5	–	3	–	0
Storrs		–		5	–	3	–	0
Cornell		–		5	–	3	–	1
Syracuse		–		5	–	3	–	2
Temple		–		3	–	2	–	0
Army		–		3	–	2	–	1
Rutgers		–		6	–	6	–	0
Carlisle		–		5	–	5	–	0
Holy Cross		–		2	–	2	–	2
Brown		–		4	–	5	–	1
Wesleyan		–		4	–	5	–	1
Dickinson		–		4	–	5	–	0
Franklin & Marshall		–		3	–	4	–	2
Geneva		–		3	–	4	–	0
Penn State		–		3	–	4	–	0
Colgate		–		3	–	4	–	1
Western Univ. Penn.		–		3	–	6	–	0
Lehigh		–		2	–	5	–	0
Tufts		–		2	–	6	–	1
Swarthmore		–		2	–	6	–	0
New Hampshire		–		1	–	4	–	0
Drexel		–		1	–	5	–	0
Massachusetts		–		0	–	4	–	0
Rhode Island		–		0	–	4	–	0

The 1896 Syracuse Orangemen football team represented Syracuse University as an independent during the 1896 college football season. The head coach was George O. Redington, coaching his second season with the Orangemen. The team finished the season with a final record of 5–3–2.

== Schedule ==
Date	Time	Opponent	Site	Result	Source
September 26		Syracuse High School	Syracuse, NY	W 24–0	
October 3		at Cornell	Ithaca, NY	L 0–22	
October 10		Elmira Athletic Association	Syracuse, NY	W 20–6	
October 17		vs. Williams	Ridgefield grounds; Albany, NY	L 6–24	
October 24		at Colgate	Hamilton, NY (rivalry)	L 0–6	
October 27		Rochester	Syracuse, NY	W 62–4	
October 31		Syracuse Athletic Association	Syracuse, NY	W 26–0	
November 7	3:30 p.m.	at Buffalo	Buffalo Athletic Field; Buffalo, NY	T 6–6	
November 14		St. John's Military Academy	Syracuse, NY	W 40–0	
November 26		at Clyde Athletic Association		T 10–10	
