= 1896 Penn State football team =

American college football season

1896 Penn State football
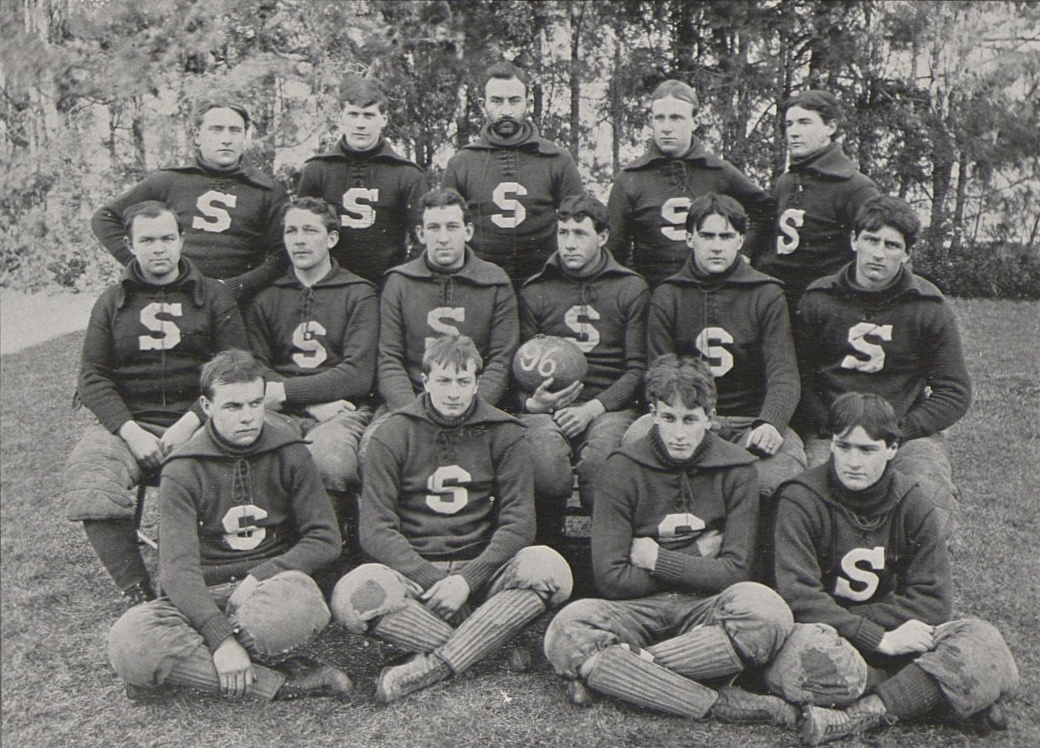
- Conference: Independent
- Record: 3–4
- Head coach: Samuel B. Newton (1st season)
- Captain: James Dunsmore
- Home stadium: Beaver Field

1896 Eastern college football independents records
	Conf.			Overall
Team	W	L	T	W		L		T
Fordham		–		1	–	0	–	0
Lafayette		–		11	–	0	–	1
Princeton		–		10	–	0	–	1
Washington & Jefferson		–		8	–	0	–	1
Penn		–		14	–	1	–	0
Yale		–		13	–	1	–	0
Pittsburgh College		–		11	–	2	–	0
Buffalo		–		9	–	1	–	2
Villanova		–		10	–	4	–	0
Bucknell		–		5	–	2	–	1
Harvard		–		7	–	4	–	0
Boston College		–		5	–	3	–	0
Storrs		–		5	–	3	–	0
Cornell		–		5	–	3	–	1
Syracuse		–		5	–	3	–	2
Temple		–		3	–	2	–	0
Army		–		3	–	2	–	1
Rutgers		–		6	–	6	–	0
Carlisle		–		5	–	5	–	0
Holy Cross		–		2	–	2	–	2
Brown		–		4	–	5	–	1
Wesleyan		–		4	–	5	–	1
Dickinson		–		4	–	5	–	0
Franklin & Marshall		–		3	–	4	–	2
Geneva		–		3	–	4	–	0
Penn State		–		3	–	4	–	0
Colgate		–		3	–	4	–	1
Western Univ. Penn.		–		3	–	6	–	0
Lehigh		–		2	–	5	–	0
Tufts		–		2	–	6	–	1
Swarthmore		–		2	–	6	–	0
New Hampshire		–		1	–	4	–	0
Drexel		–		1	–	5	–	0
Massachusetts		–		0	–	4	–	0
Rhode Island		–		0	–	4	–	0

The 1896 Penn State football team was an American football team that represented Pennsylvania State College—now known as Pennsylvania State University–as an independent during the 1896 college football season. The team was coached by Samuel B. Newton and played its home games on Beaver Field in University Park, Pennsylvania.

== Schedule ==
Date	Opponent	Site	Result	Attendance	Source
September 26	Gettysburg	Beaver Field; State College, PA	W 40–0		
October 3	Western University of Pennsylvania	Beaver Field; State College, PA (rivalry)	W 10–4		
October 10	Dickinson	Beaver Field; State College, PA	W 8–0		
October 24	at Princeton	University Field; Princeton, NJ	L 0–39	1,000	
October 31	vs. Bucknell	Athletic Park; Williamsport, PA	L 0–10	5,000	
November 14	at Penn	Franklin Field; Philadelphia, PA	L 0–27		
November 21	vs. Carlisle	Sixth Street gridiron; Harrisburg, PA	L 5–48	2,000	
