= L. N. Morris =

American football coach

Biographical details
- Education: Yale University

Coaching career (HC unless noted)
- 1896: Lehigh

Head coaching record
- Overall: 2–5

L. N. Morris was an American football coach. He was the fifth head football coach at Lehigh University in Bethlehem, Pennsylvania. He held that position for the 1896 season, compiling a record of 2–5.

== Head coaching record ==
Year	Team	Overall	Conference	Standing	Bowl/playoffs
Lehigh (Independent) (1896)
1896	Lehigh	2–5			
Lehigh:		2–5			
Total:		2–5			
