= Joseph Colnon =

American football player and coach (1870–1936)

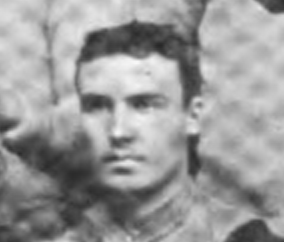
- Colnon pictured on the 1890 Cornell football team

Biographical details
- Born: August 5, 1870; Potsdam, New York, U.S.
- Died: December 8, 1936 (aged 66); New York, New York, U.S.
- Education: Cornell University (1893)

Playing career
- 1889–1893: Cornell
- Position: Guard

Coaching career (HC unless noted)
- 1895: Cornell (assistant)
- 1896: Colgate

Head coaching record
- Overall: 3–4–1

Aaron Joseph Colnon (August 5, 1870 – December 8, 1936) was an American football player and coach. He was the fifth head football coach at Colgate University, serving for one season, in 1896, and compiling a record of 3–4–1. Colnon played on the Cornell football team from 1889 to 1893. After graduating, he later played with the Duquesne and Crescent Athletic Clubs in New York. Before coaching at Colgate in 1896, he served as an assistant coach at Cornell. He was later a lawyer.

== Head coaching record ==
| Year | Team | Overall | Conference | Standing | Bowl/playoffs |
|---|---|---|---|---|---|
Colgate (Independent) (1896)
| 1896 | Colgate | 3–4–1 | | | |
| Colgate: | | 3–4–1 | | | |
| Total: | | 3–4–1 | | | |
