= 1896 Brown Bears football team =

American college football season

1896 Brown Bears football
- Conference: Independent
- Record: 4–5–1
- Head coach: Wallace Moyle (2nd season)
- Captain: E. Colby
- Home stadium: Lincoln Field, Adelaide Park

1896 Eastern college football independents records
	Conf.			Overall
Team	W	L	T	W		L		T
Fordham		–		1	–	0	–	0
Lafayette		–		11	–	0	–	1
Princeton		–		10	–	0	–	1
Washington & Jefferson		–		8	–	0	–	1
Penn		–		14	–	1	–	0
Yale		–		13	–	1	–	0
Pittsburgh College		–		11	–	2	–	0
Buffalo		–		9	–	1	–	2
Villanova		–		10	–	4	–	0
Bucknell		–		5	–	2	–	1
Harvard		–		7	–	4	–	0
Boston College		–		5	–	3	–	0
Storrs		–		5	–	3	–	0
Cornell		–		5	–	3	–	1
Syracuse		–		5	–	3	–	2
Temple		–		3	–	2	–	0
Army		–		3	–	2	–	1
Rutgers		–		6	–	6	–	0
Carlisle		–		5	–	5	–	0
Holy Cross		–		2	–	2	–	2
Brown		–		4	–	5	–	1
Wesleyan		–		4	–	5	–	1
Dickinson		–		4	–	5	–	0
Franklin & Marshall		–		3	–	4	–	2
Geneva		–		3	–	4	–	0
Penn State		–		3	–	4	–	0
Colgate		–		3	–	4	–	1
Amherst		–		3	–	6	–	1
Western Univ. Penn.		–		3	–	6	–	0
Lehigh		–		2	–	5	–	0
Tufts		–		2	–	6	–	1
Swarthmore		–		2	–	6	–	0
New Hampshire		–		1	–	4	–	0
Drexel		–		1	–	5	–	0
Massachusetts		–		0	–	4	–	0
Rhode Island		–		0	–	4	–	0

The 1896 Brown Bears football team represented Brown University as an independent in the 1896 college football season. Led by second-year head coach Wallace Moyle, Brown compiled a record of 4–5–1.

== Schedule ==
Date	Time	Opponent	Site	Result	Attendance	Source
September 26		Worcester Tech	Lincoln Field; Providence, RI	W 20–0	300	
October 7		at Yale	Yale Field; New Haven, CT	L 0–18	1,800	
October 10		Amherst	Adelaide Park; Providence, RI	W 44–6	700–1,000	
October 17	3:00 p.m.	at Harvard	Soldiers' Field; Boston, MA	L 0–12	4,000	
October 24		Lehigh	Providence, RI	W 16–0	300	
October 28		at Penn	Franklin Field; Philadelphia, PA	L 0–16	4,500	
November 3		Dartmouth	Adelaide Park; Providence, RI	T 10–10	1,000	
November 7		Yale	Adelaide Park; Providence, RI	L 6–18	2,500	
November 21		at Army	The Plain; West Point, NY	L 6–8	500	
November 26		vs. Carlisle	Manhattan Field; New York, NY	W 24–12	15,000–18,000	
