= 1896 Massachusetts Aggies football team =

American college football season

1896 Massachusetts Aggies football
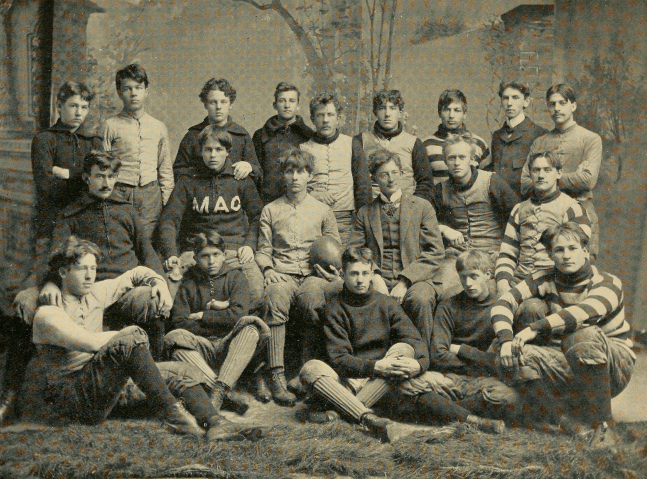
- Conference: Independent
- Record: 0–4
- Head coach: None
- Captain: John William Allen
- Home stadium: Alumni Field

1896 Eastern college football independents records
	Conf.			Overall
Team	W	L	T	W		L		T
Fordham		–		1	–	0	–	0
Lafayette		–		11	–	0	–	1
Princeton		–		10	–	0	–	1
Washington & Jefferson		–		8	–	0	–	1
Penn		–		14	–	1	–	0
Yale		–		13	–	1	–	0
Pittsburgh College		–		11	–	2	–	0
Buffalo		–		9	–	1	–	2
Villanova		–		10	–	4	–	0
Bucknell		–		5	–	2	–	1
Harvard		–		7	–	4	–	0
Boston College		–		5	–	3	–	0
Storrs		–		5	–	3	–	0
Cornell		–		5	–	3	–	1
Syracuse		–		5	–	3	–	2
Temple		–		3	–	2	–	0
Army		–		3	–	2	–	1
Rutgers		–		6	–	6	–	0
Carlisle		–		5	–	5	–	0
Holy Cross		–		2	–	2	–	2
Brown		–		4	–	5	–	1
Wesleyan		–		4	–	5	–	1
Dickinson		–		4	–	5	–	0
Franklin & Marshall		–		3	–	4	–	2
Geneva		–		3	–	4	–	0
Penn State		–		3	–	4	–	0
Colgate		–		3	–	4	–	1
Amherst		–		3	–	6	–	1
Western Univ. Penn.		–		3	–	6	–	0
Lehigh		–		2	–	5	–	0
Tufts		–		2	–	6	–	1
Swarthmore		–		2	–	6	–	0
New Hampshire		–		1	–	4	–	0
Drexel		–		1	–	5	–	0
Massachusetts		–		0	–	4	–	0
Rhode Island		–		0	–	4	–	0

The 1896 Massachusetts Aggies football team represented Massachusetts Agricultural College in the 1896 college football season. The team played its home games at Alumni Field in Amherst, Massachusetts. Massachusetts finished the season with a known record of 0–3, with the final score of one game unknown.

== Schedule ==
Note: All scores/opponents sourced from Carlson 1988.

Date	Opponent	Site	Result
October 14	Northampton YMCA	Alumni Field; Amherst, MA	L 6–10
October 17	St. Joseph's A.A.	Alumni Field; Amherst, MA	
October 21	at Mount Hermon	Mount Hermon, MA	L 0–16
October 24	at Williston Seminary	Easthampton, MA	L 6–12
