= McWhorter, West Virginia =

- Unincorporated community
- Location within West Virginia Location within the United States
- Coordinates: 39°07′38″N 80°22′58″W
- Country: United States
- State: West Virginia
- County: Harrison
- Elevation: 1,093 ft (333 m)
- Time zone: UTC-5 (Eastern (EST))
  - Summer (DST): UTC-4 (EDT)
- Area codes: 304 & 681
- GNIS feature ID: 1555092

McWhorter is an unincorporated community and coal town in Harrison County, West Virginia, United States. McWhorter is 2 miles (3.2 km) northeast of Jane Lew.

The community was named after Henry McWhorter, a pioneer settler.
