= 1896 Drexel Dragons football team =

American college football season

1896 Drexel Dragons football
- Conference: Independent
- Record: 1–5
- Head coach: None
- Captains: William Storm; R. R. Worrell
- Home stadium: West Philadelphia YMCA

1896 Eastern college football independents records
	Conf.			Overall
Team	W	L	T	W		L		T
Fordham		–		1	–	0	–	0
Lafayette		–		11	–	0	–	1
Princeton		–		10	–	0	–	1
Washington & Jefferson		–		8	–	0	–	1
Penn		–		14	–	1	–	0
Yale		–		13	–	1	–	0
Pittsburgh College		–		11	–	2	–	0
Buffalo		–		9	–	1	–	2
Villanova		–		10	–	4	–	0
Bucknell		–		5	–	2	–	1
Harvard		–		7	–	4	–	0
Boston College		–		5	–	3	–	0
Storrs		–		5	–	3	–	0
Cornell		–		5	–	3	–	1
Syracuse		–		5	–	3	–	2
Temple		–		3	–	2	–	0
Army		–		3	–	2	–	1
Rutgers		–		6	–	6	–	0
Carlisle		–		5	–	5	–	0
Holy Cross		–		2	–	2	–	2
Brown		–		4	–	5	–	1
Wesleyan		–		4	–	5	–	1
Dickinson		–		4	–	5	–	0
Franklin & Marshall		–		3	–	4	–	2
Geneva		–		3	–	4	–	0
Penn State		–		3	–	4	–	0
Colgate		–		3	–	4	–	1
Amherst		–		3	–	6	–	1
Western Univ. Penn.		–		3	–	6	–	0
Lehigh		–		2	–	5	–	0
Tufts		–		2	–	6	–	1
Swarthmore		–		2	–	6	–	0
New Hampshire		–		1	–	4	–	0
Drexel		–		1	–	5	–	0
Massachusetts		–		0	–	4	–	0
Rhode Island		–		0	–	4	–	0

The 1896 Drexel Dragons football team represented the Drexel Institute of Technology (renamed Drexel University in 1970) as an independent during the 1896 college football season. The team did not have a head coach.

== Schedule ==
Date	Opponent	Site	Result
Unknown	Central High School		W 10–0
October 14	at Chester High School	Chester Park; Chester, PA	L 0–11
October 17	at Media Shortlidge Academy	Media, PA	L 0–4
October 22	at Wilmington Art School	Wilmington, DE	L 0–10
November 6	at Northeast Manual Training School	Willow Grove, PA	L 2–6
November 18	at Media Shortlidge Academy	Media, PA	L 0–22

== Roster ==
1896 Drexel Dragons football team roster
Players
Coaches
Offense

Pos.	#	Name	Class
TE		Mills
OT		Murdaugh
G		Weihman
C		Burgess
G		S. Walter Bishop	Jr
OT		Mask
TE		Tyson
HB		Atmore
HB		William Storm (C)
FB		Jackson
QB		R. Worrell
TE, OT		Viguers

Defense

Pos.	#	Name	Class

Special teams

Pos.	#	Name	Class

Head coach

- No coach

Coordinators/assistant coaches

Legend

- (C) Team captain
- (S) Suspended
- (I) Ineligible
- Injured
- Redshirt
