= 1896 Villanova Wildcats football team =

American college football season

1896 Villanova Wildcats football
- Conference: Independent
- Record: 10–4
- Head coach: James A. McDonald (2nd season)
- Captain: James A. McDonald

1896 Eastern college football independents records
	Conf.			Overall
Team	W	L	T	W		L		T
Fordham		–		1	–	0	–	0
Lafayette		–		11	–	0	–	1
Princeton		–		10	–	0	–	1
Washington & Jefferson		–		8	–	0	–	1
Penn		–		14	–	1	–	0
Yale		–		13	–	1	–	0
Pittsburgh College		–		11	–	2	–	0
Buffalo		–		9	–	1	–	2
Villanova		–		10	–	4	–	0
Bucknell		–		5	–	2	–	1
Harvard		–		7	–	4	–	0
Boston College		–		5	–	3	–	0
Storrs		–		5	–	3	–	0
Cornell		–		5	–	3	–	1
Syracuse		–		5	–	3	–	2
Temple		–		3	–	2	–	0
Army		–		3	–	2	–	1
Rutgers		–		6	–	6	–	0
Carlisle		–		5	–	5	–	0
Holy Cross		–		2	–	2	–	2
Brown		–		4	–	5	–	1
Wesleyan		–		4	–	5	–	1
Dickinson		–		4	–	5	–	0
Franklin & Marshall		–		3	–	4	–	2
Geneva		–		3	–	4	–	0
Penn State		–		3	–	4	–	0
Colgate		–		3	–	4	–	1
Amherst		–		3	–	6	–	1
Western Univ. Penn.		–		3	–	6	–	0
Lehigh		–		2	–	5	–	0
Tufts		–		2	–	6	–	1
Swarthmore		–		2	–	6	–	0
New Hampshire		–		1	–	4	–	0
Drexel		–		1	–	5	–	0
Massachusetts		–		0	–	4	–	0
Rhode Island		–		0	–	4	–	0

The 1896 Villanova Wildcats football team represented Villanova University during the 1896 college football season. The team's captain was James A. McDonald.

== Schedule ==
Date	Time	Opponent	Site	Result	Attendance	Source
September 30		at Swarthmore	Swarthmore, PA	W 16–0		
October 3	3:30 p.m.	at Delaware	Riverview; Wilmington, DE (rivalry)	W 14–0		
October 7		at Penn scrub team	Franklin Field; Philadelphia, PA	L 5–36		
October 10		Ursinus	Villanova, PA	W 21–0		
October 14		at Haverford	Haverford, PA	W 5–4		
October 21		Swarthmore	Villanova, PA	W 10–0		
		Philadelphia Dental College	Villanova, PA	W 10–0		
October 24		at West Chester	West Chester, PA	L 0–18		
October 28		at Ursinus	Collegeville, PA	W 12–4		
October 31		at Philadelphia Dental College	Y. M. C. A. grounds; Philadelphia, PA	W 12–0		
November 7		Jefferson Medical College	Villanova, PA	W 28–0		
November 14		at Pennsylvania Military	College grounds; Chester, PA	W 24–6		
November 18		South Jersey Institute	Bridgeton, NJ	L 4–6		
November 26	2:30 p.m.	Warren A.A.	Wilmington, DE	L 0–22	3,000–4,000	
All times are in Eastern time
