= 1896 Dickinson Red and White football team =

American college football season

1896 Dickinson Red and White football
- Conference: Independent
- Record: 4–5
- Head coach: Nathan Stauffer (1st season)

1896 Eastern college football independents records
	Conf.			Overall
Team	W	L	T	W		L		T
Fordham		–		1	–	0	–	0
Lafayette		–		11	–	0	–	1
Princeton		–		10	–	0	–	1
Washington & Jefferson		–		8	–	0	–	1
Penn		–		14	–	1	–	0
Yale		–		13	–	1	–	0
Pittsburgh College		–		11	–	2	–	0
Buffalo		–		9	–	1	–	2
Villanova		–		10	–	4	–	0
Bucknell		–		5	–	2	–	1
Harvard		–		7	–	4	–	0
Boston College		–		5	–	3	–	0
Storrs		–		5	–	3	–	0
Cornell		–		5	–	3	–	1
Syracuse		–		5	–	3	–	2
Temple		–		3	–	2	–	0
Army		–		3	–	2	–	1
Rutgers		–		6	–	6	–	0
Carlisle		–		5	–	5	–	0
Holy Cross		–		2	–	2	–	2
Brown		–		4	–	5	–	1
Wesleyan		–		4	–	5	–	1
Dickinson		–		4	–	5	–	0
Franklin & Marshall		–		3	–	4	–	2
Geneva		–		3	–	4	–	0
Penn State		–		3	–	4	–	0
Colgate		–		3	–	4	–	1
Amherst		–		3	–	6	–	1
Western Univ. Penn.		–		3	–	6	–	0
Lehigh		–		2	–	5	–	0
Tufts		–		2	–	6	–	1
Swarthmore		–		2	–	6	–	0
New Hampshire		–		1	–	4	–	0
Drexel		–		1	–	5	–	0
Massachusetts		–		0	–	4	–	0
Rhode Island		–		0	–	4	–	0

The 1896 Dickinson Red and White football team was an American football team that represented Dickinson College as an independent during the 1896 college football season. The team compiled a 4–5 record and outscored opponents by a total of 130 to 90. Nathan Stauffer was the team's head coach.

== Schedule ==
Date	Time	Opponent	Site	Result	Attendance	Source
September 26	3:00 p.m.	vs. Carlisle	Athletic field; Carlisle, PA	L 6–28		
October 3		Ursinus	Carlisle, PA	W 40–0		
October 10		at Penn State	Beaver Field; State College, PA	L 0–8		
October 17		Susquehanna	Carlisle, PA	W 40–0		
October 31		at Lafayette	March Field; Easton, PA	L 0–18		
November 3		at Penn	Franklin Field; Philadelphia, PA	L 2–30	3,000	
November 7		Haverford	Carlisle, PA	W 32–0		
November 21	2:55 p.m.	vs. Bucknell	Sunbury, PA	L 0–6	350–1,000	
November 26	2:10 p.m.	at York YMCA	Association Field / Small's Meadow; York, PA	W 10–0	600–1,200	
