= 1896 Buffalo football team =

American college football season

1896 Buffalo football
- Conference: Independent
- Record: 9–1–2
- Head coach: Fred D. Townsend (1st season)
- Captain: Irving Johnson
- Home stadium: Buffalo Athletic Field, Olympic Park

1896 Eastern college football independents records
	Conf.			Overall
Team	W	L	T	W		L		T
Fordham		–		1	–	0	–	0
Lafayette		–		11	–	0	–	1
Princeton		–		10	–	0	–	1
Washington & Jefferson		–		8	–	0	–	1
Penn		–		14	–	1	–	0
Yale		–		13	–	1	–	0
Pittsburgh College		–		11	–	2	–	0
Buffalo		–		9	–	1	–	2
Villanova		–		10	–	4	–	0
Bucknell		–		5	–	2	–	1
Harvard		–		7	–	4	–	0
Boston College		–		5	–	3	–	0
Storrs		–		5	–	3	–	0
Cornell		–		5	–	3	–	1
Syracuse		–		5	–	3	–	2
Temple		–		3	–	2	–	0
Army		–		3	–	2	–	1
Rutgers		–		6	–	6	–	0
Carlisle		–		5	–	5	–	0
Holy Cross		–		2	–	2	–	2
Brown		–		4	–	5	–	1
Wesleyan		–		4	–	5	–	1
Dickinson		–		4	–	5	–	0
Franklin & Marshall		–		3	–	4	–	2
Geneva		–		3	–	4	–	0
Penn State		–		3	–	4	–	0
Colgate		–		3	–	4	–	1
Amherst		–		3	–	6	–	1
Western Univ. Penn.		–		3	–	6	–	0
Lehigh		–		2	–	5	–	0
Tufts		–		2	–	6	–	1
Swarthmore		–		2	–	6	–	0
New Hampshire		–		1	–	4	–	0
Drexel		–		1	–	5	–	0
Massachusetts		–		0	–	4	–	0
Rhode Island		–		0	–	4	–	0

The 1896 Buffalo football team represented the University of Buffalo as an independent during the 1896 college football season. The team compiled an 9–1–2 record. Buffalo's coach was Fred D. Townsend and played its home games at Buffalo Athletic Field and Olympic Park in Buffalo, New York.

== Schedule ==
Date	Time	Opponent	Site	Result	Source
September 26		25th Separate Company of Tonawanda	Buffalo Athletic Field; Buffalo, NY	W 30–0	
October 7		at Company C, National Guard	Bradford, PA	W 18–0	
October 10	3:30 p.m.	Rochester	Buffalo Athletic Field; Buffalo, NY	W 62–6	
October 14		Buffalo High School	Buffalo Athletic Field; Buffalo, NY	W 30–0	
October 17		Elmira Athletic Club	Buffalo Athletic Field; Buffalo, NY	W 18–0	
October 24		Lancaster Football Club	Olympic Park; Buffalo, NY	W 16–4	
October 31		St. Bonaventure	Buffalo Athletic Field; Buffalo, NY	W 6–4	
November 3		St. John's Military Academy	Buffalo Athletic Field; Buffalo, NY	W 22–5	
November 7	3:30 p.m.	Syracuse	Buffalo Athletic Field; Buffalo, NY	T 6–6	
November 11	3:30 p.m.	at Rochester YMCA	Rochester, NY	W 16–0	
November 18		Lancaster Football Club	Buffalo Athletic Field; Buffalo, NY	L 6–10	
November 26		Hobart	Buffalo Athletic Field; Buffalo, NY	T 6–6	
