= 1896 Rutgers Queensmen football team =

American college football season

1896 Rutgers Queensmen football
- Conference: Independent
- Record: 5–7
- Head coach: John C. B. Pendleton (1st season)
- Captain: John N. Mills
- Home stadium: Neilson Field

1896 Eastern college football independents records
	Conf.			Overall
Team	W	L	T	W		L		T
Fordham		–		1	–	0	–	0
Lafayette		–		11	–	0	–	1
Princeton		–		10	–	0	–	1
Washington & Jefferson		–		8	–	0	–	1
Penn		–		14	–	1	–	0
Yale		–		13	–	1	–	0
Pittsburgh College		–		11	–	2	–	0
Buffalo		–		9	–	1	–	2
Villanova		–		10	–	4	–	0
Bucknell		–		5	–	2	–	1
Harvard		–		7	–	4	–	0
Boston College		–		5	–	3	–	0
Storrs		–		5	–	3	–	0
Cornell		–		5	–	3	–	1
Syracuse		–		5	–	3	–	2
Temple		–		3	–	2	–	0
Army		–		3	–	2	–	1
Rutgers		–		6	–	6	–	0
Carlisle		–		5	–	5	–	0
Holy Cross		–		2	–	2	–	2
Brown		–		4	–	5	–	1
Wesleyan		–		4	–	5	–	1
Dickinson		–		4	–	5	–	0
Franklin & Marshall		–		3	–	4	–	2
Geneva		–		3	–	4	–	0
Penn State		–		3	–	4	–	0
Colgate		–		3	–	4	–	1
Amherst		–		3	–	6	–	1
Western Univ. Penn.		–		3	–	6	–	0
Lehigh		–		2	–	5	–	0
Tufts		–		2	–	6	–	1
Swarthmore		–		2	–	6	–	0
New Hampshire		–		1	–	4	–	0
Drexel		–		1	–	5	–	0
Massachusetts		–		0	–	4	–	0
Rhode Island		–		0	–	4	–	0

The 1896 Rutgers Queensmen football team represented Rutgers University as an independent during the 1896 college football season. In their first season under head coach John C. B. Pendleton, the Queensmen compiled a 5–7 record. The team captain was John N. Mills.

== Schedule ==
Date	Time	Opponent	Site	Result	Attendance	Source
October 3		at Princeton	Princeton, NJ (rivalry)	L 0–44		
October 7	4:15 p.m.	Ursinus	New Brunswick, NJ	W 20–0		
October 10		at Elizabeth Athletic Club	Elizabeth, NJ	L 0–28	500	
October 14		at Lehigh	South Bethlehem, PA	L 0–44		
October 17		Haverford	Neilson Field; New Brunswick, NJ	W 6–2		
October 21		Stevens	Neilson Field; New Brunswick, NJ	W 10–0		
October 24		at Swarthmore	Whittier Field; Swarthmore, PA	W 16–10		
October 31		at Navy	Worden Field; Annapolis, MD	L 6–40		
November 3		at Irvington Athletic Club	Eastern Park; Brooklyn, NY	L 0–24	1,000	
November 7		vs. Union (NY)	Albany, NY	L 0–10		
November 11		at Stevens	St. George's Cricket Club grounds; Hoboken, NJ	L 0–10		
November 14		Newark Athletic Club	New Brunswick, NJ	W 4–0		
