= 1896 Geneva Covenanters football team =

American college football season

1896 Geneva Covenanters football
- Conference: Independent
- Record: 3–4
- Head coach: William McCracken (7th season)
- Home stadium: Geneva Park

1896 Eastern college football independents records
	Conf.			Overall
Team	W	L	T	W		L		T
Fordham		–		1	–	0	–	0
Lafayette		–		11	–	0	–	1
Princeton		–		10	–	0	–	1
Washington & Jefferson		–		8	–	0	–	1
Penn		–		14	–	1	–	0
Yale		–		13	–	1	–	0
Pittsburgh College		–		11	–	2	–	0
Buffalo		–		9	–	1	–	2
Villanova		–		10	–	4	–	0
Bucknell		–		5	–	2	–	1
Harvard		–		7	–	4	–	0
Boston College		–		5	–	3	–	0
Storrs		–		5	–	3	–	0
Cornell		–		5	–	3	–	1
Syracuse		–		5	–	3	–	2
Temple		–		3	–	2	–	0
Army		–		3	–	2	–	1
Rutgers		–		6	–	6	–	0
Carlisle		–		5	–	5	–	0
Holy Cross		–		2	–	2	–	2
Brown		–		4	–	5	–	1
Wesleyan		–		4	–	5	–	1
Dickinson		–		4	–	5	–	0
Franklin & Marshall		–		3	–	4	–	2
Geneva		–		3	–	4	–	0
Penn State		–		3	–	4	–	0
Colgate		–		3	–	4	–	1
Amherst		–		3	–	6	–	1
Western Univ. Penn.		–		3	–	6	–	0
Lehigh		–		2	–	5	–	0
Tufts		–		2	–	6	–	1
Swarthmore		–		2	–	6	–	0
New Hampshire		–		1	–	4	–	0
Drexel		–		1	–	5	–	0
Massachusetts		–		0	–	4	–	0
Rhode Island		–		0	–	4	–	0

The 1896 Geneva Covenanters football team was an American football team that represented Geneva College as an independent during the 1896 college football season. William McCracken was in his seventh and final year as head coach. Geneva's football record book claims a record of 3–4.

Geneva's records omit one of three games played in 1896 against the local Nonpareil Athletic Club. According to The Pittsburgh Post, the second of the three games (on October 24) was an unscheduled exhibition played "just for the fun of the thing", with neither team fielding its best lineup, in advance of a "real game" between the two teams on November 3. However, Geneva lists an 8–0 loss and a 12–0 win against Nonpareil, which match the scores of the second and third games.

Geneva also excludes from its records an unplayed game against the Western University of Pennsylvania (WUP, later the University of Pittsburgh) on November 14. According to The Pittsburgh Press, the referee awarded the game to the WUP 6–0 after Geneva refused to play against WUP's allegedly professional player-coach, George W. Hoskins. The University of Pittsburgh counts the game as a 6–0 forfeit win.

== Schedule ==
Date	Opponent	Site	Result	Attendance	Source
September 23	vs. Nonpareil Athletic Club	Fair grounds; Beaver, PA	L 4–8 or 4–10		
September 26	at West Virginia	Morgantown, WV	L 0–6	800	
October 10	Washington & Jefferson	Geneva Park; Beaver Falls, PA	L 0–34		
October 17	Grove City	Geneva Park; Beaver Falls, PA	W 32–0	300	
October 24	Nonpareil Athletic Club	Geneva Park; Beaver Falls, PA	L 0–8		
November 3	at Nonpareil Athletic Club	Junction Park; Beaver Falls, PA	W 12–0		
November 7	at Westminster (PA)	New Wilmington, PA	W 16–4		
November 14	Western University of Pennsylvania	Geneva Park; Beaver Falls, PA	L 0–6 (forfeit)		
November 21	at Grove City	Grove City, PA	L 6–10		
