= 1896 New Hampshire football team =

American college football season

1896 New Hampshire football
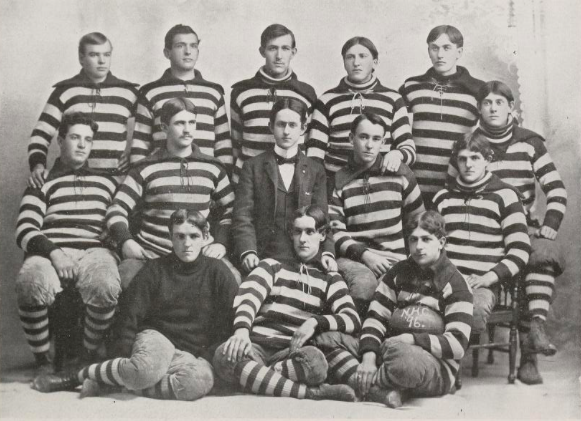
- Team captain Hayes at bottom right, holding football
- Conference: Independent
- Record: 1–4 (Note: per the University's media guide; 1896 sources differ)
- Head coach: None
- Captain: Fred F. Hayes
- Home stadium: Burgett Park, Dover, NH; College grounds, Durham, NH

1896 Eastern college football independents records
	Conf.			Overall
Team	W	L	T	W		L		T
Fordham		–		1	–	0	–	0
Lafayette		–		11	–	0	–	1
Princeton		–		10	–	0	–	1
Washington & Jefferson		–		8	–	0	–	1
Penn		–		14	–	1	–	0
Yale		–		13	–	1	–	0
Pittsburgh College		–		11	–	2	–	0
Buffalo		–		9	–	1	–	2
Villanova		–		10	–	4	–	0
Bucknell		–		5	–	2	–	1
Harvard		–		7	–	4	–	0
Boston College		–		5	–	3	–	0
Storrs		–		5	–	3	–	0
Cornell		–		5	–	3	–	1
Syracuse		–		5	–	3	–	2
Temple		–		3	–	2	–	0
Army		–		3	–	2	–	1
Rutgers		–		6	–	6	–	0
Carlisle		–		5	–	5	–	0
Holy Cross		–		2	–	2	–	2
Brown		–		4	–	5	–	1
Wesleyan		–		4	–	5	–	1
Dickinson		–		4	–	5	–	0
Franklin & Marshall		–		3	–	4	–	2
Geneva		–		3	–	4	–	0
Penn State		–		3	–	4	–	0
Colgate		–		3	–	4	–	1
Amherst		–		3	–	6	–	1
Western Univ. Penn.		–		3	–	6	–	0
Lehigh		–		2	–	5	–	0
Tufts		–		2	–	6	–	1
Swarthmore		–		2	–	6	–	0
New Hampshire		–		1	–	4	–	0
Drexel		–		1	–	5	–	0
Massachusetts		–		0	–	4	–	0
Rhode Island		–		0	–	4	–	0

The 1896 New Hampshire football team (Note: The school did not adopt the Wildcats nickname until February 1926; before then, they were generally referred to as "the blue and white".) was an American football team that represented New Hampshire College of Agriculture and the Mechanic Arts (Note: The school was often referred to as New Hampshire College or New Hampshire State College in newspapers of the era.) during the 1896 college football season—the school became the University of New Hampshire in 1923. The team played a five-game schedule and finished with a record of 2–3 or 1–4, per 1896 sources or modern sources, respectively.

== Schedule ==
Scoring during this era awarded 4 points for a touchdown, 2 points for a conversion kick (extra point), and 5 points for a field goal. Teams played in the one-platoon system and the forward pass was not yet legal. Games were played in two halves rather than four quarters.

Date	Opponent	Site	per 1896 sources		per modern sources	
Date	Opponent	Site	Result	Source	Result	Source
September 26	at Brewster Academy	Wolfeboro, NH	W 12–0		not listed	
October 9	Bates	Burgett Park · Dover, NH	L 6–10		L 6–10	
October 14	at Colby	Waterville, ME	L 0–28		L 0–28	
October 17	at Andover Academy	Andover, MA	L 0–16		L 0–16	
October 23	Brewster Academy	Durham, NH	W 32–0		W 32–0	
October 30	Somersworth High School	Burgett Park · Dover, NH	NH second team		L 0–10	
Overall record			(2–3)		(1–4)	

College Football Data Warehouse and the University's media guide do not list the game against Brewster Academy, but do list the game against Somersworth. The New Hampshire College Monthly provides a summary of the Brewster Academy game, and refers to the Bates contest as the "second game this season". The College Monthly notes that the Somersworth game was contested by New Hampshire's second team (backups) rather than the varsity.

The October 14 game was the first meeting between the New Hampshire and Colby football programs.

Maine State College (now the University of Maine) released a football schedule in September that listed a game against New Hampshire to be played on November 7. However, that game was not played, and the first Maine–New Hampshire game would not occur until 1903.

== Roster ==
Name	Position	Team photo location
Richard C. Butterfield	left tackle	seated, far left
Arthur W. Colburn	left end	seated, right-center (next to Demerritt)
G. S. Demerritt	student manager	seated, center (in suit)
Arthur Given	center	standing, center
A. G. Gordon	substitute	seated, right-end behind Hayes
Hayden	right end	standing, leftmost
Fred F. Hayes (captain)	right halfback	on floor, right (with football)
J. Norton Hunt	left end	on floor, left
Rane	fullback	seated, second from left
Fred D. Sanborn	right tackle	seated, extreme right
Everett S. Whittemore	left guard	standing, second from right
C. F. Willard	right guard	standing, second from left
Wilson	quarterback	on floor, center
Wright	left halfback	standing, rightmost
