= 1896 Bucknell football team =

American college football season

1896 Bucknell football
- Conference: Independent
- Record: 5–2–1
- Head coach: Will Young (4th season)
- Captain: Emmanuel Cober

1896 Eastern college football independents records
	Conf.			Overall
Team	W	L	T	W		L		T
Fordham		–		1	–	0	–	0
Lafayette		–		11	–	0	–	1
Princeton		–		10	–	0	–	1
Washington & Jefferson		–		8	–	0	–	1
Penn		–		14	–	1	–	0
Yale		–		13	–	1	–	0
Pittsburgh College		–		11	–	2	–	0
Buffalo		–		9	–	1	–	2
Villanova		–		10	–	4	–	0
Bucknell		–		5	–	2	–	1
Harvard		–		7	–	4	–	0
Boston College		–		5	–	3	–	0
Storrs		–		5	–	3	–	0
Cornell		–		5	–	3	–	1
Syracuse		–		5	–	3	–	2
Temple		–		3	–	2	–	0
Army		–		3	–	2	–	1
Rutgers		–		6	–	6	–	0
Carlisle		–		5	–	5	–	0
Holy Cross		–		2	–	2	–	2
Brown		–		4	–	5	–	1
Wesleyan		–		4	–	5	–	1
Dickinson		–		4	–	5	–	0
Franklin & Marshall		–		3	–	4	–	2
Geneva		–		3	–	4	–	0
Penn State		–		3	–	4	–	0
Colgate		–		3	–	4	–	1
Amherst		–		3	–	6	–	1
Western Univ. Penn.		–		3	–	6	–	0
Lehigh		–		2	–	5	–	0
Tufts		–		2	–	6	–	1
Swarthmore		–		2	–	6	–	0
New Hampshire		–		1	–	4	–	0
Drexel		–		1	–	5	–	0
Massachusetts		–		0	–	4	–	0
Rhode Island		–		0	–	4	–	0

The 1896 Bucknell football team was an American football team that represented Bucknell University as an independent during the 1896 college football season. Led by Will Young in his fourth and final season as head coach, Bucknell compiled a record of 5–2–1. Emmanuel Cober was the team captain.

== Schedule ==
Date	Time	Opponent	Site	Result	Attendance	Source
September 26	2:00 p.m.	Wyoming Seminary	Bucknell campus; Lewisburg, PA	W 10–0	600	
October 3		at Penn	Franklin Field; Philadelphia, PA	L 0–40	2,500	
October 17	2:30 p.m.	Penn reserves	Bucknell campus; Lewisburg, PA	W 10–0		
October 31		vs. Penn State	Athletic Park; Williamsport, PA	W 10–0	5,000	
November 7		at Cornell	Percy Field; Ithaca, NY	L 0–54		
November 14	2:30 p.m.	Bloomsburg Normal	Bucknell campus; Lewisburg, PA	W 18–6		
November 21	2:55 p.m.	vs. Dickinson	Sunbury, PA	W 6–0	350–1,000	
November 26	3:00 p.m.	at Franklin & Marshall	College grounds; Lancaster, PA	T 0–0	5,000	
