= 1896 Storrs Aggies football team =

American college football season

1896 Storrs Aggies football
- Conference: Independent
- Record: 5–3
- Head coach: None
- Captain: Beardsley
- Home stadium: Athletic Fields

1896 Eastern college football independents records
	Conf.			Overall
Team	W	L	T	W		L		T
Fordham		–		1	–	0	–	0
Lafayette		–		11	–	0	–	1
Princeton		–		10	–	0	–	1
Washington & Jefferson		–		8	–	0	–	1
Penn		–		14	–	1	–	0
Yale		–		13	–	1	–	0
Pittsburgh College		–		11	–	2	–	0
Buffalo		–		9	–	1	–	2
Villanova		–		10	–	4	–	0
Bucknell		–		5	–	2	–	1
Harvard		–		7	–	4	–	0
Boston College		–		5	–	3	–	0
Storrs		–		5	–	3	–	0
Cornell		–		5	–	3	–	1
Syracuse		–		5	–	3	–	2
Temple		–		3	–	2	–	0
Army		–		3	–	2	–	1
Rutgers		–		6	–	6	–	0
Carlisle		–		5	–	5	–	0
Holy Cross		–		2	–	2	–	2
Brown		–		4	–	5	–	1
Wesleyan		–		4	–	5	–	1
Dickinson		–		4	–	5	–	0
Franklin & Marshall		–		3	–	4	–	2
Geneva		–		3	–	4	–	0
Penn State		–		3	–	4	–	0
Colgate		–		3	–	4	–	1
Amherst		–		3	–	6	–	1
Western Univ. Penn.		–		3	–	6	–	0
Lehigh		–		2	–	5	–	0
Tufts		–		2	–	6	–	1
Swarthmore		–		2	–	6	–	0
New Hampshire		–		1	–	4	–	0
Drexel		–		1	–	5	–	0
Massachusetts		–		0	–	4	–	0
Rhode Island		–		0	–	4	–	0

The 1896 Storrs Aggies football team represented Storrs Agricultural College, now the University of Connecticut, as an independent during the 1896 college football season. This was the first year that the school fielded a football team. The Aggies completed the season with a record of 5–3, against a mix of nearby high school and YMCA teams.

== Schedule ==
Date	Opponent	Site	Result	Source
October 3	at Rockville High School	Rockville, CT	W 16–6	
October 10	at Norwich Free Academy	Norwich, CT	L 6–22	
October 17	Willimantic YMCA	Athletic Fields; Storrs, CT	W 16–0	
October 24	Willimantic YMCA	Athletic Fields; Storrs, CT	W 6–0	
October 31	Middletown High School	Athletic Fields; Storrs, CT	L 0–4	
November 7	at Willimantic High School	Willimantic, CT	W 16–8	
November 14	Willimantic High School	Athletic Fields; Storrs, CT	W 4–0	
November 26	at Middletown High School	Pameacha grounds; Middletown, CT	L 0–16	

== Roster ==
Storrs 1896 roster
Guards: Clark; Savage; Tackles: Minor; W. N. Hawley	Center: Parker; Ends: C. B. Hawley; Pentecost	Backs: Edwin S. Mansfield; Beardsley (C); Ontrop; Webb
