= 1896 Boston College football team =

American college football season

1896 Boston College football
- Conference: Independent
- Record: 5–3
- Head coach: Frank Carney (1st season)
- Captain: Joe Walsh
- Home stadium: South End Grounds

1896 Eastern college football independents records
	Conf.			Overall
Team	W	L	T	W		L		T
Fordham		–		1	–	0	–	0
Lafayette		–		11	–	0	–	1
Princeton		–		10	–	0	–	1
Washington & Jefferson		–		8	–	0	–	1
Penn		–		14	–	1	–	0
Yale		–		13	–	1	–	0
Pittsburgh College		–		11	–	2	–	0
Buffalo		–		9	–	1	–	2
Villanova		–		10	–	4	–	0
Bucknell		–		5	–	2	–	1
Harvard		–		7	–	4	–	0
Boston College		–		5	–	3	–	0
Storrs		–		5	–	3	–	0
Cornell		–		5	–	3	–	1
Syracuse		–		5	–	3	–	2
Temple		–		3	–	2	–	0
Army		–		3	–	2	–	1
Rutgers		–		6	–	6	–	0
Carlisle		–		5	–	5	–	0
Holy Cross		–		2	–	2	–	2
Brown		–		4	–	5	–	1
Wesleyan		–		4	–	5	–	1
Dickinson		–		4	–	5	–	0
Franklin & Marshall		–		3	–	4	–	2
Geneva		–		3	–	4	–	0
Penn State		–		3	–	4	–	0
Colgate		–		3	–	4	–	1
Amherst		–		3	–	6	–	1
Western Univ. Penn.		–		3	–	6	–	0
Lehigh		–		2	–	5	–	0
Tufts		–		2	–	6	–	1
Swarthmore		–		2	–	6	–	0
New Hampshire		–		1	–	4	–	0
Drexel		–		1	–	5	–	0
Massachusetts		–		0	–	4	–	0
Rhode Island		–		0	–	4	–	0

The 1896 Boston College football team was an American football team that represented Boston College as an independent during the 1896 college football season. Led by Frank Carney in his first and only season as head coach, Boston College compiled a record of 5–3.

This was the first year of the Boston College–Holy Cross football rivalry and produced one of its most controversial games. BC and HC both claim to have won their November 14 matchup at the South End Grounds, after each one refused to follow referees', instructions following a disputed play with three minutes remaining in the game. Holy Cross was leading 6–4 when Boston College scored what its players, and a raucous home crowd, asserted was the go-ahead touchdown; Holy Cross maintained the runner had been tackled for a loss. Officials initially ruled in favor of Holy Cross, and Boston College's players refused to take the field, leading the officials to declare a 6–4 Holy Cross win. Under pressure from the Boston crowd, however, they reversed their decision and asked Holy Cross, which had now left the field itself, to resume play. Holy Cross players refused. The game restarted with only Boston College players, who promptly scored a touchdown (then worth 4 points) to end the game with an 8–6 victory. Decades later, the two colleges continued to disagree on who had won the game.

== Schedule ==
Date	Opponent	Site	Result	Attendance	Source
October 3	at Campello	Brockton Fairgrounds; Brockton, MA	L 0–24		
October 7	at Exeter Academy		W 8–0		
October 10	Andover Academy		W 14–6		
October 14	at Tufts	Tufts Oval; Somerville, MA	L 8–22		
October 24	at Whitman Athletic Club		L 0–4		
November 7	at Holy Cross	Worcester College Grounds; Worcester, MA (rivalry)	W 6–2		
November 14	Holy Cross	South End Grounds; Boston, MA	W 8–6	500	
November 28	Boston University	South End Grounds; Boston, MA (rivalry)	W 10–0		
