= 1896 Cornell Big Red football team =

American college football season

1896 Cornell Big Red football
- Conference: Independent
- Record: 5–3–1
- Head coach: George Sanford (1st season)
- Captain: Joseph Beacham
- Home stadium: Percy Field

1896 Eastern college football independents records
	Conf.			Overall
Team	W	L	T	W		L		T
Fordham		–		1	–	0	–	0
Lafayette		–		11	–	0	–	1
Princeton		–		10	–	0	–	1
Washington & Jefferson		–		8	–	0	–	1
Penn		–		14	–	1	–	0
Yale		–		13	–	1	–	0
Pittsburgh College		–		11	–	2	–	0
Buffalo		–		9	–	1	–	2
Villanova		–		10	–	4	–	0
Bucknell		–		5	–	2	–	1
Harvard		–		7	–	4	–	0
Boston College		–		5	–	3	–	0
Storrs		–		5	–	3	–	0
Cornell		–		5	–	3	–	1
Syracuse		–		5	–	3	–	2
Temple		–		3	–	2	–	0
Army		–		3	–	2	–	1
Rutgers		–		6	–	6	–	0
Carlisle		–		5	–	5	–	0
Holy Cross		–		2	–	2	–	2
Brown		–		4	–	5	–	1
Wesleyan		–		4	–	5	–	1
Dickinson		–		4	–	5	–	0
Franklin & Marshall		–		3	–	4	–	2
Geneva		–		3	–	4	–	0
Penn State		–		3	–	4	–	0
Colgate		–		3	–	4	–	1
Amherst		–		3	–	6	–	1
Western Univ. Penn.		–		3	–	6	–	0
Lehigh		–		2	–	5	–	0
Tufts		–		2	–	6	–	1
Swarthmore		–		2	–	6	–	0
New Hampshire		–		1	–	4	–	0
Drexel		–		1	–	5	–	0
Massachusetts		–		0	–	4	–	0
Rhode Island		–		0	–	4	–	0

The 1896 Cornell Big Red football team was an American football team that represented Cornell University during the 1896 college football season. In their first season under head coach George Sanford, the Big Red compiled a 5–3–1 record and outscored all opponents by a combined total of 162 to 82.

== Schedule ==
Date	Time	Opponent	Site	Result	Attendance	Source
September 26		Colgate	Percy Field; Ithaca, NY (rivalry)	W 6–0		
October 3		Syracuse	Percy Field; Ithaca, NY	W 22–0		
October 10		Western Reserve	Percy Field; Ithaca, NY	W 48–0		
October 17		Tufts	Percy Field; Ithaca, NY	W 18–0		
October 24		Harvard	Percy Field; Ithaca, NY	L 4–13		
October 31		at Princeton	Princeton, NJ	L 0–37	6,000	
November 7		Bucknell	Percy Field; Ithaca, NY	W 54–0		
November 14	2:30 p.m.	vs. Williams	Buffalo Athletic Field; Buffalo, NY	T 0–0	5,000	
November 26		at Penn	Franklin Field; Philadelphia, PA (rivalry)	L 10–32		
