= 1896 Pittsburgh College football team =

American college football season

1896 Pittsburgh College football
- Conference: Independent
- Head coach: Ernest Brown (1st season)

1896 Eastern college football independents records
	Conf.			Overall
Team	W	L	T	W		L		T
Fordham		–		1	–	0	–	0
Lafayette		–		11	–	0	–	1
Princeton		–		10	–	0	–	1
Washington & Jefferson		–		8	–	0	–	1
Penn		–		14	–	1	–	0
Yale		–		13	–	1	–	0
Pittsburgh College		–		11	–	2	–	0
Buffalo		–		9	–	1	–	2
Villanova		–		10	–	4	–	0
Bucknell		–		5	–	2	–	1
Harvard		–		7	–	4	–	0
Boston College		–		5	–	3	–	0
Storrs		–		5	–	3	–	0
Cornell		–		5	–	3	–	1
Syracuse		–		5	–	3	–	2
Temple		–		3	–	2	–	0
Army		–		3	–	2	–	1
Rutgers		–		6	–	6	–	0
Carlisle		–		5	–	5	–	0
Holy Cross		–		2	–	2	–	2
Brown		–		4	–	5	–	1
Wesleyan		–		4	–	5	–	1
Dickinson		–		4	–	5	–	0
Franklin & Marshall		–		3	–	4	–	2
Geneva		–		3	–	4	–	0
Penn State		–		3	–	4	–	0
Colgate		–		3	–	4	–	1
Amherst		–		3	–	6	–	1
Western Univ. Penn.		–		3	–	6	–	0
Lehigh		–		2	–	5	–	0
Tufts		–		2	–	6	–	1
Swarthmore		–		2	–	6	–	0
New Hampshire		–		1	–	4	–	0
Drexel		–		1	–	5	–	0
Massachusetts		–		0	–	4	–	0
Rhode Island		–		0	–	4	–	0

The 1896 Pittsburgh College football team was an American football team that represented Pittsburgh Catholic College of the Holy Ghost—now known as Duquesne University—during the 1896 college football season. Ernest Brown served in his first and only season as the team's head coach. Duquesne University claims a season record of 12–1 based on the first 13 of 15 games played by its reserve (second) team – but does not acknowledge the first team or its record of 2–4–1 or 1–5–1.

In advance of the season, the college rebranded its sports teams from Holy Ghost College to Pittsburg(h) College. This change was prompted by concerns that the religious name was being used disrespectfully or flippantly in sporting contexts.

== Schedule ==
=== First team ===
Date	Opponent	Site	Result	Source
October 3	Sewickley Athletic Association	Pittsburgh College grounds; Pittsburgh, PA	W 22–0	
October 10	at Duquesne Country and Athletic Club	Exposition Park; Allegheny, PA	L 0–24	
October 17	at Carnegie Athletic Club	Carnegie Athletic Park; Braddock, PA	T 6–6	
October 24	at Emerald Athletic Club	Emerald Park; Pittsburgh, PA	disputed (Note: The Pittsburg Post and the Pittsburgh Commercial Gazette reported a 9–8 Emerald win (protested by the College), while The Pittsburg Press reported a disputed final score of either 6–5 in favor of College or 9–6 in favor of Emerald.)	
November 6	at Mahoning Cycle Club	Youngstown, OH	L 0–16	
November 14	J. F. Lalus Athletic Club	Pittsburgh College grounds; Pittsburgh, PA	L 0–6 (forfeit)	
November 26	at Nonpareil Athletic Club	Junction Park; Beaver Falls, PA	L 0–16	

=== Reserve team ===
Date	Opponent	Site	Result	Source
October 3	Emerald Athletic Club reserves	Pittsburgh College grounds; Pittsburgh, PA	W 8–0	
October 7	Allegheny High School	Pittsburgh College grounds; Pittsburgh, PA	W 6–0 (forfeit)	
October 10	J. F. Lalus Athletic Club	Pittsburgh College grounds; Pittsburgh, PA	L 0–52	
October 15	at Park Institute	Recreation Park; Allegheny, PA	W 10–8	
October 17	Emerald Athletic Club reserves	Pittsburgh College grounds; Pittsburgh, PA	W 20–0	
October 21	Etna Our Boys	Pittsburgh College grounds; Pittsburgh, PA	W 12–0	
October 24	Arion Athletic Club	Pittsburgh College grounds; Pittsburgh, PA	W 4–0 (forfeit)	
October 28	Keystone Tigers	Pittsburgh College grounds; Pittsburgh, PA	W 28–0	
October 31	Orange Athletic Club (PA)	Pittsburgh College grounds; Pittsburgh, PA	W 20–0	
November 7	Imperial Athletic Club reserves	Pittsburgh College grounds; Pittsburgh, PA	W 20–6	
November 12	Pittsburgh Times	Pittsburgh College grounds; Pittsburgh, PA	W 69–0	
November 14	Keystone Tigers	Pittsburgh College grounds; Pittsburgh, PA	W 33–0	
November 18	Henderson Athletic Club	Pittsburgh College grounds; Pittsburgh, PA	W 38–0	
November 24	Keystone Tigers	Pittsburgh College grounds; Pittsburgh, PA	W 4–0 (forfeit)	
November 26	Press Young Folks' League	Pittsburgh College grounds; Pittsburgh, PA	L 4–6	

=== Discrepancies in records ===
The Duquesne University football record book gives the 1896 season record as 12–1 on the basis of games that, according to 1896 newspapers, were played by the reserve (second) team. The schedule in the record book is identical to that in the November 1896 issue of the Holy Ghost College Bulletin, which listed results of games played "up to the time of going to press". Neither source includes the first-team results or the last two reserve-team games, which were against the Keystone Tigers (November 24) and Press Young Folks' League (November 26). College Football Data Warehouse lists a similar schedule but omits the forfeit win against Allegheny High School and adds a supposed 10–0 loss against the Allegheny Athletic Association on November 10, for a season record of 11–2. Pittsburgh newspapers of 1896 reported that the Allegheny Athletic Association's opponent on November 10 was the Duquesne Country and Athletic Club, with Allegheny winning 12–0.
