= 1896 Lehigh football team =

American college football season

1896 Lehigh football
- Conference: Independent
- Record: 2–5
- Head coach: L. N. Morris (1st season)

1896 Eastern college football independents records
	Conf.			Overall
Team	W	L	T	W		L		T
Fordham		–		1	–	0	–	0
Lafayette		–		11	–	0	–	1
Princeton		–		10	–	0	–	1
Washington & Jefferson		–		8	–	0	–	1
Penn		–		14	–	1	–	0
Yale		–		13	–	1	–	0
Pittsburgh College		–		11	–	2	–	0
Buffalo		–		9	–	1	–	2
Villanova		–		10	–	4	–	0
Bucknell		–		5	–	2	–	1
Harvard		–		7	–	4	–	0
Boston College		–		5	–	3	–	0
Storrs		–		5	–	3	–	0
Cornell		–		5	–	3	–	1
Syracuse		–		5	–	3	–	2
Temple		–		3	–	2	–	0
Army		–		3	–	2	–	1
Rutgers		–		6	–	6	–	0
Carlisle		–		5	–	5	–	0
Holy Cross		–		2	–	2	–	2
Brown		–		4	–	5	–	1
Wesleyan		–		4	–	5	–	1
Dickinson		–		4	–	5	–	0
Frankin & Marshall		–		3	–	4	–	2
Geneva		–		3	–	4	–	0
Penn State		–		3	–	4	–	0
Colgate		–		3	–	4	–	1
Amherst		–		3	–	6	–	1
Western Univ. Penn.		–		3	–	6	–	0
Lehigh		–		2	–	5	–	0
Tufts		–		2	–	6	–	1
Swarthmore		–		2	–	6	–	0
New Hampshire		–		1	–	4	–	0
Drexel		–		1	–	5	–	0
Massachusetts		–		0	–	4	–	0
Rhode Island		–		0	–	4	–	0

The 1896 Lehigh football team was an American football team that represented Lehigh University as an independent during the 1896 college football season. In its first and only season under head coach L. N. Morris, the team compiled a 2–5 record and was outscored by a total of 130 to 80.

== Schedule ==
Date	Opponent	Site	Result	Attendance	Source
October 10	at Princeton	Princeton, NJ	L 0–16		
October 14	Rutgers	South Bethlehem, PA	W 44–0		
October 17	at Penn	Franklin Field; Philadelphia, PA	L 0–34		
October 24	at Brown	Providence, RI	L 0–16	300	
October 31	vs. Michigan	Detroit Athletic Club; Detroit, MI	L 0–40	2,000–3,000	
November 7	at Navy	Worden Field; Annapolis, MD	L 10–24		
November 14	Maryland Athletic Club	Bethlehem, PA	W 26–0		
