= Fred T. Murphy =

American college football player (1872–1948)

Yale Bulldogs
- Position: Tackle
- Class: Graduate

Personal information
- Born: October 23, 1872; Detroit, Michigan, U.S.
- Died: January 10, 1948 (aged 75); Grosse Pointe, Michigan, U.S.

Career information
- College: Yale University (1893–1896)

Awards and highlights
- 2× Consensus All-American (1895, 1896)

Fred Towsley Murphy (October 23, 1872 – January 10, 1948) was an American college football and college baseball player and physician. He played football at Yale University from 1893 to 1896. He was named to the 1895 College Football All-America Team and the 1896 College Football All-America Team as a tackle.

== Playing career ==
Murphy attended Yale University, where he played tackle for the school's football team. He was selected as an All-American at that position in 1895. In 1894, Murphy was injured in the Harvard–Yale football game that became known as the "Hampden Park Blood Bath." The game had become increasingly brutal with the introduction of mass formation. In the 1894 game, four players on each team suffered serious injuries, resulting in the cancellation of the football rivalry between the two schools. Murphy was left unconscious for five hours in a hospital as a result of the beating he took in the game.

In addition to football, he also played on the Yale baseball team during his junior year.

== Education and medical career ==
Murphy was educated at Phillips Academy, graduated from Yale with a Bachelor of Arts in 1897, and studied at Harvard Medical School (M.D. 1901). He was assistant in anatomy at the Harvard Medical School, 1903–4; Austin teaching fellow in surgery, 1905; visiting surgeon to the clinic, 1909–11, and assistant in surgery 1910–11. From 1904 to 1908 he was assistant surgeon at the Infants Hospital, Boston, and from 1907 to 1911 surgeon to out-patients at the Massachusetts General Hospital. In 1911 he was appointed professor of surgery at the School of Medicine at Washington University in St. Louis and, in 1914, chief surgeon of the Barnes Hospital and consulting surgeon of the City Hospital, St. Louis, but resigned in 1919 to become a practicing surgeon in Detroit. During World War I he was 'director and commanding officer of Base Hospital 21 in France (1917–8), and later was director of the medical and surgical department of the American Red Cross, representing the chief surgeon of the American Expeditionary Forces, with the rank of colonel. He was awarded the Distinguished Service Medal.
