= 1896 Washington & Jefferson football team =

American college football season

1896 Washington & Jefferson football
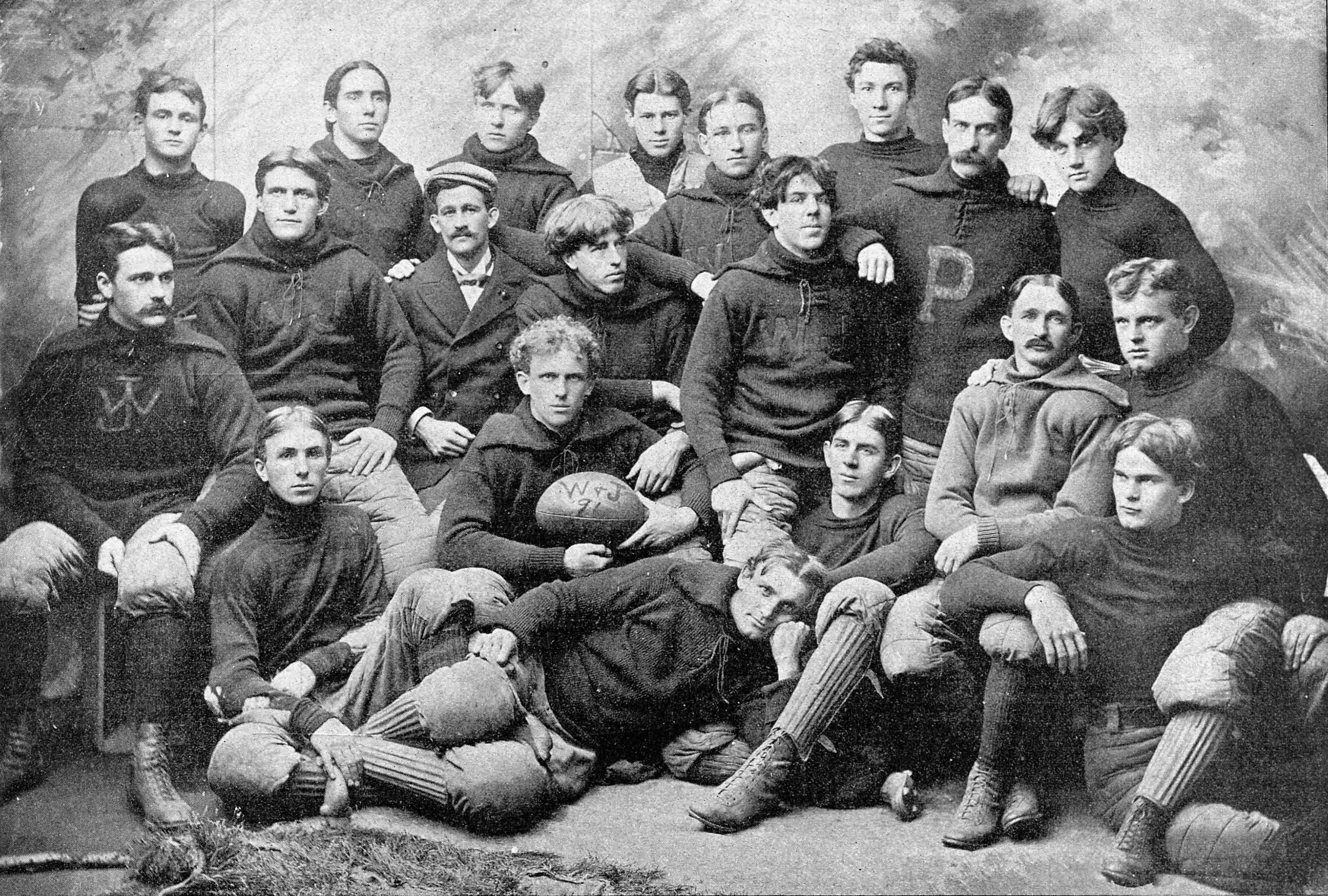
- Conference: Independent
- Record: 8–0–1
- Head coach: Clinton Wood (1st season)
- Captain: William D. Inglis

1896 Eastern college football independents records
	Conf.			Overall
Team	W	L	T	W		L		T
Fordham		–		1	–	0	–	0
Lafayette		–		11	–	0	–	1
Princeton		–		10	–	0	–	1
Washington & Jefferson		–		8	–	0	–	1
Penn		–		14	–	1	–	0
Yale		–		13	–	1	–	0
Pittsburgh College		–		11	–	2	–	0
Buffalo		–		9	–	1	–	2
Villanova		–		10	–	4	–	0
Bucknell		–		5	–	2	–	1
Harvard		–		7	–	4	–	0
Boston College		–		5	–	3	–	0
Storrs		–		5	–	3	–	0
Cornell		–		5	–	3	–	1
Syracuse		–		5	–	3	–	2
Temple		–		3	–	2	–	0
Army		–		3	–	2	–	1
Rutgers		–		6	–	6	–	0
Carlisle		–		5	–	5	–	0
Holy Cross		–		2	–	2	–	2
Brown		–		4	–	5	–	1
Wesleyan		–		4	–	5	–	1
Dickinson		–		4	–	5	–	0
Franklin & Marshall		–		3	–	4	–	2
Geneva		–		3	–	4	–	0
Penn State		–		3	–	4	–	0
Colgate		–		3	–	4	–	1
Amherst		–		3	–	6	–	1
Western Univ. Penn.		–		3	–	6	–	0
Lehigh		–		2	–	5	–	0
Tufts		–		2	–	6	–	1
Swarthmore		–		2	–	6	–	0
New Hampshire		–		1	–	4	–	0
Drexel		–		1	–	5	–	0
Massachusetts		–		0	–	4	–	0
Rhode Island		–		0	–	4	–	0

The 1896 Washington & Jefferson football team was an American football team that represented Washington & Jefferson College as an independent during the 1896 college football season. Led by first-year head coach Clinton Wood, the team compiled a record of 8–0–1 and did not allow their opponents to score all season.

== Schedule ==
Date	Time	Opponent	Site	Result	Attendance	Source
September 26		Bethany (WV)	Washington, PA	W 36–0	1,000	
October 3	4:05 p.m.	Pittsburgh Athletic Club	Washington, PA	T 0–0		
October 10		at Geneva	Beaver Falls, PA	W 34–0		
October 17		Thiel	Washington, PA	W 54–0		
October 24		Otterbein	Washington, PA	W 16–0		
October 31		at Pittsburgh Athletic Club	P. A. C. Park; Pittsburgh, PA	W 21–0	3,000	
November 7		Allegheny Athletic Club (Note: This was a team of students from Pittsburgh-area seminaries, not the professional Allegheny Athletic Association team that won both of its two games in 1896.)	Washington, PA	W 17–0		
November 14		at Western Reserve	Cleveland, OH	W 8–0		
November 26		at Duquesne Country and Athletic Club	Exposition Park; Pittsburgh, PA	W 4–0	12,000	
