= 1896 Holy Cross football team =

American college football season

1896 Holy Cross football
- Conference: Independent
- Record: 2–2–2
- Head coach: Alfred C. N. Petersen (1st season)
- Captain: John J. Finn
- Home stadium: Worcester Agricultural Fairgrounds, Worcester College Grounds

1896 Eastern college football independents records
| | Conf. | | | Overall |
| Team | W | L | T | W | | L | | T |
|---|---|---|---|---|---|---|---|---|
| Fordham | | – | | 1 | – | 0 | – | 0 |
| Lafayette | | – | | 11 | – | 0 | – | 1 |
| Princeton | | – | | 10 | – | 0 | – | 1 |
| Washington & Jefferson | | – | | 8 | – | 0 | – | 1 |
| Penn | | – | | 14 | – | 1 | – | 0 |
| Yale | | – | | 13 | – | 1 | – | 0 |
| Pittsburgh College | | – | | 11 | – | 2 | – | 0 |
| Buffalo | | – | | 9 | – | 1 | – | 2 |
| Villanova | | – | | 10 | – | 4 | – | 0 |
| Bucknell | | – | | 5 | – | 2 | – | 1 |
| Harvard | | – | | 7 | – | 4 | – | 0 |
| Boston College | | – | | 5 | – | 3 | – | 0 |
| Storrs | | – | | 5 | – | 3 | – | 0 |
| Cornell | | – | | 5 | – | 3 | – | 1 |
| Syracuse | | – | | 5 | – | 3 | – | 2 |
| Temple | | – | | 3 | – | 2 | – | 0 |
| Army | | – | | 3 | – | 2 | – | 1 |
| Rutgers | | – | | 6 | – | 6 | – | 0 |
| Carlisle | | – | | 5 | – | 5 | – | 0 |
| Holy Cross | | – | | 2 | – | 2 | – | 2 |
| Brown | | – | | 4 | – | 5 | – | 1 |
| Wesleyan | | – | | 4 | – | 5 | – | 1 |
| Dickinson | | – | | 4 | – | 5 | – | 0 |
| Frankin & Marshall | | – | | 3 | – | 4 | – | 2 |
| Geneva | | – | | 3 | – | 4 | – | 0 |
| Penn State | | – | | 3 | – | 4 | – | 0 |
| Colgate | | – | | 3 | – | 4 | – | 1 |
| Amherst | | – | | 3 | – | 6 | – | 1 |
| Western Univ. Penn. | | – | | 3 | – | 6 | – | 0 |
| Lehigh | | – | | 2 | – | 5 | – | 0 |
| Tufts | | – | | 2 | – | 6 | – | 1 |
| Swarthmore | | – | | 2 | – | 6 | – | 0 |
| New Hampshire | | – | | 1 | – | 4 | – | 0 |
| Drexel | | – | | 1 | – | 5 | – | 0 |
| Massachusetts | | – | | 0 | – | 4 | – | 0 |
| Rhode Island | | – | | 0 | – | 4 | – | 0 |

The 1896 Holy Cross football team was an American football team that represented the College of the Holy Cross as an independent in the 1896 college football season. In their first year under head coach Alfred C. N. Petersen, the team compiled a 2–2–2 record. John J. Finn was the team captain.

Holy Cross' record book considers this its first season of varsity football play. It also featured the first game in the Boston College–Holy Cross football rivalry, as well as the most controversial game in the history of the rivalry – and of Holy Cross football. BC and HC each claim to have won the November 14 rematch game, after both teams refused to follow referees' instructions following a controversial play with three minutes remaining in the game. Holy Cross was leading 6-4 when Boston College scored what its players, and a raucous home crowd, asserted was the go-ahead touchdown; Holy Cross maintained the runner had been tackled for a loss. Officials initially ruled in favor of Holy Cross, and Boston College's players protested by refusing to take the field, leading the officials to declare a 6-4 Holy Cross win. Under pressure from the South End Grounds crowd, however, they reversed their decision and asked Holy Cross, whose players were already celebrating their win, to resume play. Holy Cross refused. The game restarted with only Boston College players, who promptly scored a touchdown (then worth 4 points) to end the game with an 8-6 victory. Decades later, the two colleges continued to disagree on who had won the game. Because of the disputed win, some statisticians list Holy Cross with a 1–3–2 record in 1896.

One of Holy Cross' star players this year was Louis Sockalexis, a multi-sport athlete who later found fame as the first Native American player in Major League Baseball.

Holy Cross played its home games at two off-campus fields in Worcester, Massachusetts, the Worcester Agricultural Fairgrounds and the Worcester College Grounds.

== Schedule ==
| Date | Opponent | Site | Result | Attendance | Source |
|---|---|---|---|---|---|
| October 17 | Worcester Tech | Worcester Agricultural Fairgrounds; Worcester, MA | L 0–10 | | |
| October 24 | Boston University | Worcester College Grounds; Worcester, MA | T 0–0 | 500 | |
| October 31 | Newton A.A. | Worcester College Grounds; Worcester, MA | T 0–0 | | |
| November 7 | Boston College | Worcester College Grounds; Worcester, MA (rivalry) | L 2–6 | | |
| November 14 | at Boston College | South End Grounds; Boston, MA | W 6–4 | 500 | |
| November 27 | Worcester Academy | Worcester College Grounds; Worcester, MA | W 14–0 | | |
