= Joseph J. O'Donnell Field =

Baseball field in Boston, Massachusetts

- O'Donnell Field
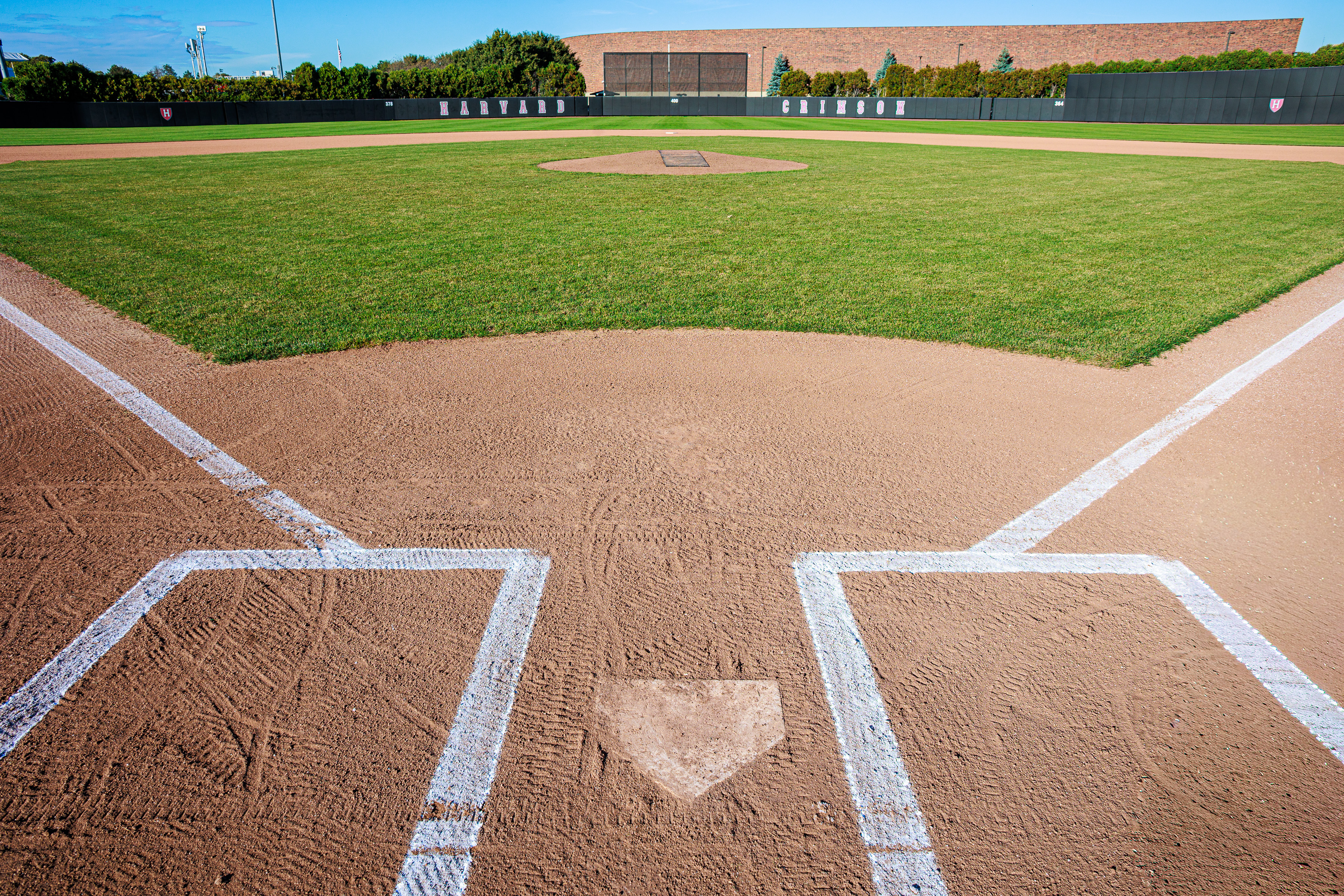
- View from home plate
- Interactive map of Joseph J. O'Donnell Field
- Former names: Soldier's Field (1898–1997)
- Location: 65 North Harvard Street, Boston, Massachusetts, USA
- Coordinates: 42.366566°N 71.12884°W
- Owner: Harvard University
- Operator: Harvard University
- Capacity: 1,600
- Surface: Natural grass
- Scoreboard: Electronic
- Field size: Left field: 335 feet (102 m); Left center field: 370 feet (110 m); Center field: 415 feet (126 m); Right center field: 370 feet (110 m); Right field: 335 feet (102 m)

Construction
- Opened: April 27, 1898
- Renovated: 2004

Tenant
- Harvard Crimson baseball (NCAA DI Ivy) (1898–present)

1.47.0-wmf.17 (ea3055a)

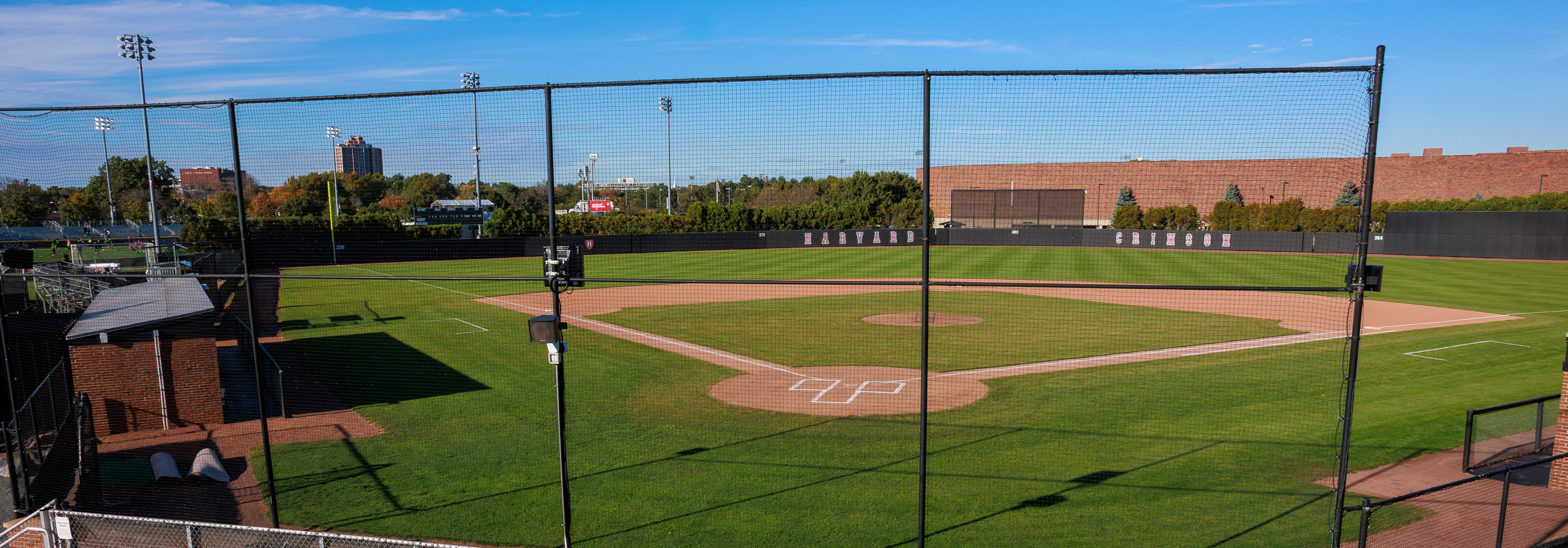
View from the visitor stands

Joseph J. O'Donnell Field is a baseball venue in Boston, Massachusetts, United States. It is home to the Harvard Crimson baseball team of Harvard University. Formerly known as Soldier's Field, the location has been home to Harvard baseball since 1898. The venue is named for Joseph J. O'Donnell, a Harvard alumnus who played baseball and football while attending the school. It has a capacity of 1,600 spectators.

== History ==
=== Donation and dedication ===
The land on which O'Donnell sits was donated to Harvard in 1890 by Major Henry Lee Higginson; Higginson named the site Soldier's Field after six of his friends who died fighting in the Civil War– James Savage, Jr., Charles Russell Lowell, Edward Barry Dalton, Stephen George Perkins, James Jackson Lowell, Robert Gould Shaw. At the site's dedication, Higginson said in an address to Harvard's students:

This field means more than a playground to me, for I ask to make it a memorial to some dear friends who gave their lives, and all that they had or hoped for, to their country and to their fellow men in the hour of great need—the War of the Rebellion. They gave their lives in the cause of virtue and good government, and to save our nation from the great sins of disunion and of slavery. This is what we claim for our northern men.

=== Use ===
The Harvard baseball program moved to the location in 1898; from 1884–1897, it had played at Holmes Field, which Harvard also used for football games and track and field competitions. The Harvard Crimson football and track and field teams continued to share Soldier's Field until moving to Harvard Stadium.

On April 27, 1898, in the first game played on the field, Harvard defeated Dartmouth 13–7.

Prior to a doubleheader against Dartmouth on May 4, 1997, the field was dedicated to Joseph J. O'Donnell, Harvard class of 1967. O'Donnell played baseball and football at Harvard, captaining the baseball team during his senior season. He donated $2.5 million to the baseball program in 1995, allowing it to hire a head coach on a full-time basis. In 2012, O'Donnell donated an additional $30 million to the university.

The 1998 Harvard team had a 15–0 record at O'Donnell Field and is the only team in program history to have an undefeated home record.

== Features ==
The field features a natural grass surface, bullpens, and shrubbery beyond the outfield fence. Bleacher seating is located behind home plate and on the first base side of the field. In 2004, a new backstop and dugouts were added to the field. Additionally, the height of the outfield fence was raised from three feet to four feet.

Harvard Stadium stands next to the field on the first base side.

== Other uses ==
The field has hosted the baseball tournament of the summer Bay State Games on several occasions. It also hosts high school baseball showcases.

== See also ==
- List of NCAA Division I baseball venues
