= Head III =

1949 painting by Francis Bacon

- Artist: Francis Bacon
- Year: 1949
- Medium: Oil on canvas
- Dimensions: 81 cm × 66 cm (32 in × 26 in)
- Location: Private collection

Head III is an oil painting by Francis Bacon, one of series of works made in 1949 for his first one-man exhibition at the Hanover Gallery, in London. As with the other six paintings in the series, it focuses on the disembodied head of a male figure, who looks out with a penetrating gaze, but is fixed against an isolating, flat, nondescript background, while also enfolded by hazy horizontal foreground curtain-like folds, which seem to function like a surrounding cage.

Head III was first exhibited in November 1949 at the Hanover in a showing commissioned by one of the artist's early champions, Erica Brausen. The six head paintings were painted during a short period of time, when Bacon was under pressure to provide works for the Hanover exhibition. Of the series, Head I, Head II, and Head VI are today seen as artistically successful, with Head VI as groundbreaking, and a direct precursor to Bacon's seminal 1950s many representations of Popes. Head III is important as the first of the series in which Bacon masters the effect of the horizontal folds, and the ambiguous facial expression of the subject nears that of Diego Velázquez's Portrait of Innocent X; his primary source for these paintings.

The painting is in a private collection, having been sold at auction at Sotheby's in 2013 for £10,442,500.

== Description ==
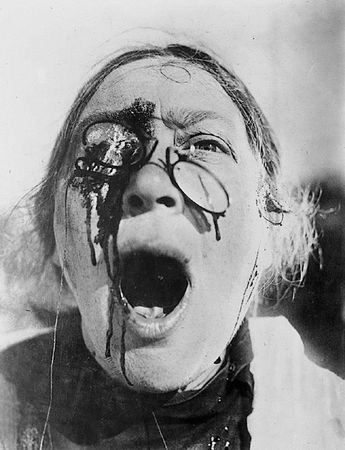
Image from Battleship Potemkin (1925)

The painting measures 81 by 66 centimetres (32 in × 26 in). Perhaps a portrait of Bacon's lover Eric Hall, the grisaille work depicts a bald man's head with pock-marked discoloured off-white face, partially concealed by diaphanous curtains.

The face has an enigmatic expression, with his cold eyes - emphasised by bright marks of zinc white - looking out through broken pince-nez spectacles. This is the first occasion when the motif of broken glasses appears in Bacon's work, inspired by the image of an injured nurse in the 1925 film Battleship Potemkin. The open-mouthed scream of the nurse in the film would also become a theme of Bacon's work, including Head VI, and Fragment of a Crucifixion.

== Commission and provenance ==
The 1949 Hanover gallery exhibition included the six Head paintings, and four other important early works by Bacon: Three Studies for Figures at the Base of a Crucifixion, Figure in a landscape, Study from the Human Body (also known as Study for Figure) and Study for Portrait (also known as Man in a Blue Box).

They are usually interpreted as intermediate steps from the preliminary images in Head I and Head II towards the final image of Head VI, the first of Bacon's paintings to reference Velázquez and his Portrait of Innocent X of 1650. Head III was the first of the six paintings to be sold at the Hanover Gallery exhibition. It was acquired by US art collector Wright Saltus Ludington (brother of Charles Townsend Ludington) in October 1949, shortly before the exhibition opened in November 1949. It was later sold to Sir Edward and Lady Hulton, and passed through the hands of several private collectors. It was included in Bacon's retrospective at the Tate Gallery in 1985, and sold again at Sotheby's in London in 2013.

== Reception ==
Head III was described by Wyndham Lewis in The Listener on 12 May 1949, page 811: "Bacon's picture, as usual, is in lamp-black monochrome, the zinc white of the monster’s eyes glittering in the cold crumbling grey of the face. Bacon is a Grand Guignol artist: the mouths in his heads are unpleasant places, evil passions make a glittering white mess of the lips." and then in The Listener on 17 November 1949, page 860. He later wrote that "part of the head is rotting away into space".

== See also ==
- List of paintings by Francis Bacon
