= Study after Velázquez =

1950 painting by Francis Bacon

- Artist: Francis Bacon
- Year: 1950
- Subject: Pope Innocent X

Study after Velázquez is a large 1950 panel painting by the Irish-born English artist Francis Bacon. After Head VI (1949), it is the second of Bacon's many paintings based on the depiction of Pope Innocent X, head of the Catholic Church from 1644 to 1655, in Diego Velázquez's Portrait of Innocent X (c. 1650).

Study after Velázquez shows a full length view of the pope, engulfed in vertical folds that may be either the linings of a curtain or the bars of a cage. The folds serve to emphasise the figure's isolation, and were drawn from devices used by Edgar Degas in the late 19th century, which Bacon described as "shuttering". He said that, to him the device meant that the "sensation doesn't come straight out at you but slides slowly and gently across".

The painting was intended as part of a series of Popes for an exhibition at the Hanover Gallery in September 1950. Following a crisis of confidence, Bacon withdrew and destroyed the canvasses he had been working on. A number of works in the series, including this painting, re-emerged in the late 1990s, and are considered among the finest of his output. Before it re-emerged, it was often reproduced in low quality as a black and white photograph.

== See also ==
- List of paintings by Francis Bacon

== Sources ==
- Arya, Rina. "Painting the Pope: An Analysis of Francis Bacon's Study After Velazquez's Portrait of Innocent X". Literature and Theology, volume 23, No. 1, 2009. JSTOR 23927139
- Davies, Hugh & Yard, Sally, Francis Bacon. (New York) Cross River Press. ISBN 0-89659-447-5
- Dawson, Barbara; Sylvester, David. Francis Bacon in Dublin. London: Thames & Hudson, 2000. ISBN 0-500-28254-4
- Farr, Dennis; Peppiatt, Michael; Yard, Sally. Francis Bacon: A Retrospective. NY: Harry N Abrams, 1999. ISBN 978-0-8109-2925-8
