= Figure with Meat =

1954 painting by Francis Bacon

- Artist: Francis Bacon
- Year: 1954
- Medium: Oil on canvas
- Dimensions: 129.9 cm × 121.9 cm (51.1 in × 48.0 in)
- Location: Art Institute of Chicago; Chicago

Figure with Meat is a 1954 painting by the Irish-born artist Francis Bacon. The figure is based on Pope Innocent X's depiction by Diego Velázquez in Portrait of Innocent X (c. 1650); in Bacon's painting the Pope is shown as a gruesome figure and placed between two bisected halves of a cow. The carcass is likely derived from Rembrandt's Slaughtered Ox (1655). Bacon had previously depicted cow carcasses in Painting 1946.

Figure with Meat is in the permanent collection of the Art Institute of Chicago.

== Description ==
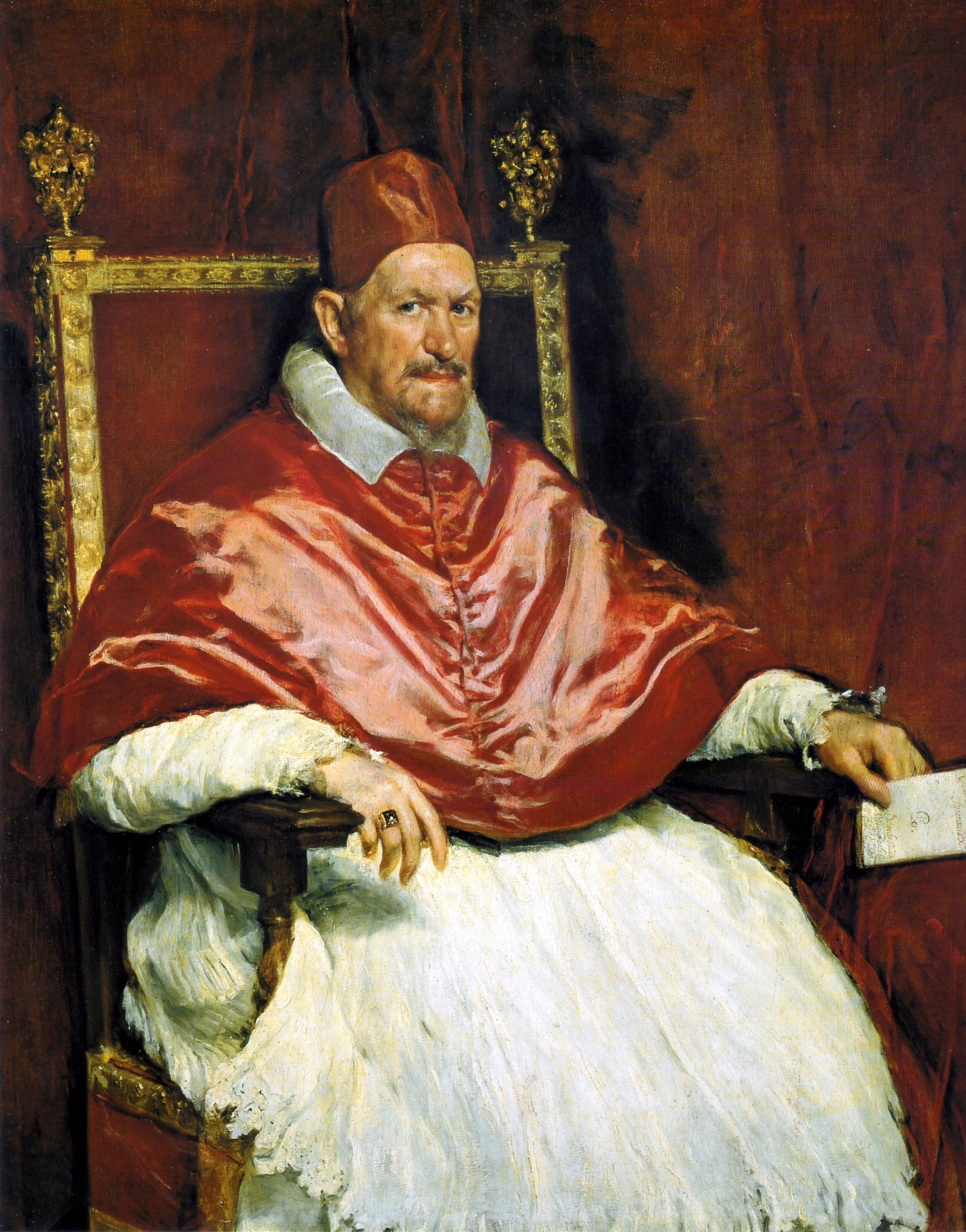
Pope Innocent X's depiction in Diego Velázquez's Portrait of Innocent X (1650) was used by Bacon as a reference for Figure with Meat

According to Mary Louise Schumacher of the Milwaukee Journal Sentinel, "Bacon appropriated [Portrait of Innocent X], with its subject, enthroned and draped in satins and lace, his stare stern and full of authority. In Bacon's version, animal carcasses hang at the pope's back, creating a raw and disturbing Crucifixion-like composition. The pope's hands, elegant and poised in Velázquez's version, are rough hewn and gripping the church's seat of authority in apparent terror. His mouth is held in a scream and black striations drip down from the pope's nose to his neck. The fresh meat recalls the lavish arrangements of fruits, meats and confections in 17th-century vanitas paintings, which usually carried subtle moralizing messages about the impermanence of life and the spiritual dangers of sensual pleasures. Sometimes, the food itself showed signs of being overripe or spoiled, to make the point. Bacon weds the imagery of salvation, worldly decadence, power and carnal sensuality, and he contrasts those things with his own far more palpable and existential view of damnation".

== Influence ==
The painting is featured in Tim Burton's 1989 film Batman. Criminals led by the Joker break into an art museum and vandalize various works of art; but upon seeing Figure with Meat, the Joker stops one of his men from damaging it, remarking "I kind of like this one, Bob. Leave it." Craig Shaw Gardner's novelization explains that it was in that art that Joker saw "A black-and-white figure, screaming with pain and anguish and madness, a creature both pitiful and terrifying in its intensity, as if it contained all the pain and anguish and madness in the world."

== See also ==
- List of paintings by Francis Bacon
