= Head VI =

1949 painting by Francis Bacon

Head VI, 1949. 93.2 × 76.5 cm (36.7 × 30.1 in), Arts Council collection, Hayward Gallery, London

Head VI is an oil-on-canvas painting by Irish-born figurative artist Francis Bacon, the last of six panels making up his "1949 Head" series. It shows a bust view of a single figure, modelled on Diego Velázquez's Portrait of Innocent X. Bacon applies forceful, expressive brush strokes and places the figure within a glass cage structure, behind curtain-like drapery. This gives the effect of a man trapped and suffocated by his surroundings, screaming into an airless void.

Head VI was the first of Bacon's paintings to reference Velázquez, whose portrait of Pope Innocent X haunted him throughout his career and inspired his series of "screaming popes", a loose series of which there are around 45 surviving individual works. Head VI contains many motifs that were to reappear in Bacon's work. The hanging object, which may be a light switch or curtain tassel, can be found even in his late paintings. The geometric cage is a motif that appears as late as his 1985–86 masterpiece Study for a Self-Portrait—Triptych.

Head VI was first exhibited in November 1949 at the Hanover Gallery in London, in a showing organised by one of the artist's early champions, Erica Brausen. At the time, Bacon was a highly controversial but respected artist, best known for his 1944 Three Studies for Figures at the Base of a Crucifixion, which made him the enfant terrible of British art. Head VI drew a mixed reaction from art critics; John Russell, later Bacon's biographer, at the time dismissed it as a cross between "an alligator shorn of its jaws and an accountant in pince-nez who has come to a bad end". In 1989 Lawrence Gowing wrote that the "shock of the picture, when it was seen with a whole series of heads ... was indescribable. It was everything unpardonable. The paradoxical appearance at once of pastiche and iconoclasm was indeed one of Bacon's most original strokes." Art critic and curator David Sylvester described it as a seminal piece from Bacon's unusually productive 1949–50 period, and one of Bacon's finest popes.

== 1949 Head series ==
Bacon's output is characterised by sequences of images. He told Sylvester that his imagination was stimulated by sequences and that "images breed other images in me". His series were not always planned or painted in sequence; sometimes paintings are grouped for convenience but vary in execution and tone. The idea for the head series came after he returned penniless, late in 1948, from a stay in Tangier. In the previous three years he had been unable to find a voice; the last surviving canvas from this period is his Painting (1946). Although he continued to paint, he was a ruthless self-critic, given to slashing canvases with blades, and no works survive from between 1947 and the winter of 1948. Gallerist Erica Brausen offered Bacon the opportunity of a solo show for the opening of her new Hanover Gallery. He agreed, but had nothing in reserve to hang. In following years, Brausen became perhaps the most important of Bacon's early champions; she arranged this showing—his debut solo exhibition—publicised him widely and organised viewings for international buyers.

Already 40 years old, Bacon viewed the exhibition as his last chance and applied himself to the task with determination. Because he had destroyed all his output of the last three years, he had little choice but to present new works. He did not have a grand plan when he agreed to the show, but eventually found themes that interested him in his Head I of the previous year, and executed five progressively stronger variants in the final weeks before the November exhibition, completing the series barely in time for the opening.

Head I, 1948. The first in the series and painted in 1948. This painting contains outlines of shoulders but they are collapsed. As in Head II, the upper head has dissolved into a void.

The paintings depict isolated figures enclosed in undefined, overwhelmingly claustrophobic, reductive, and eerie spaces. Coming early in Bacon's career, they are uneven in quality, but show a clear progression, especially in how they utilise and present ideas he was still clearly developing and coming to terms with. Head I (actually begun in the winter of 1948) and Head II show formless pieces of flesh that broadly resemble human heads; they have half-open eyes and a pharynx, though it is positioned much higher than would be expected in a human. Heads III, IV and V show fully formed busts recognisable as men, and are characterised by a haunted atmosphere. These two broad ideas coalesce in Head VI, which is as physiologically tortured as the first two paintings, and as spectral as the middle three. In Head VI the figure has developed and is now shown wearing vestments, the first indication in Bacon's work of the influence of Velázquez, while the focus has become the open mouth and the study of the human scream.

Bacon said that chance played a significant role in his work, and that he often approached a canvas without having a clear idea of what might emerge. This was especially the case in the mid- to late 1940s, a period when he was drinking heavily and spending most nights in Soho casinos and poker rooms. The following morning he would often approach his canvas "in a bad mood of drinking ... under tremendous hangovers and drink; I sometimes hardly knew what I was doing." He incorporated his appetite for chance into his work: an image often would morph midway through into something quite different from what he had first intended. He actively sought out this freedom and felt it was crucial to his artistic progression. To him, lifestyle and art were intertwined; he said that "perhaps the drink helped me to be a bit freer." This is very evident in the 1949 series, which began as a rather morbid study of a collapsed head, but evolved over the six surviving panels into a reworking of Velázquez masterpieces, and arrived at an image that was to preoccupy Bacon for the subsequent 20 years.

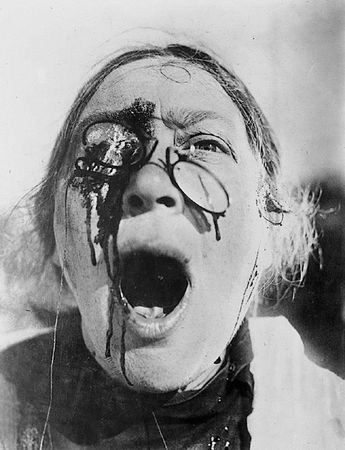
Still from Eisenstein's Battleship Potemkin (1925). Bacon described this still from the silent film as a key catalyst for his work.

The series marks Bacon's first attempt at depicting lone figures in rooms. For him, the key aspect was that it appeared that the subject felt isolated and unobserved, and had abandoned the need to present an outward face. He believed that under these circumstances all pretence falls away, and the social being becomes the sum of its neuroses, which Bacon attempted to convey by reducing the subject to its bare-bones features: a mouth, ears, eyes, a jaw. According to Russell, "the view out front ceases to be the only one, and our person is suddenly adrift, fragmented, and subject to strange mutation." Russell observed that while the depiction of figures in rooms is common through all eras of painting, the figures are always posed, and usually seemingly aware that they are being portrayed. This conceit is abandoned in Bacon's series.

Head I, completed late in 1948, is considered more successful than Head II. Although it is well-regarded critically, Head II is seen as something of a creative cul-de-sac, while Heads III, IV and V are usually considered as merely intermediate steps towards Head VI. It is exceptional in Bacon's oeuvre that works of their relative poor quality survive; he was ruthlessly self-critical and often slashed or abandoned canvasses before they were completed. When pressed again by Brausen in 1953 to produce works for a New York show that she had been publicising for a year, he was full of doubt and destroyed most of what he had been working on, including several other popes.

Brausen commissioned another showing to be held in 1950, for which Bacon painted three large popes modelled on Velázquez's portrait. The gallery advertised the show as "Francis Bacon: Three Studies from the Painting of Innocent X by Velázquez", but in the end Bacon was dissatisfied with the works and destroyed them before the show opened.

== Description ==
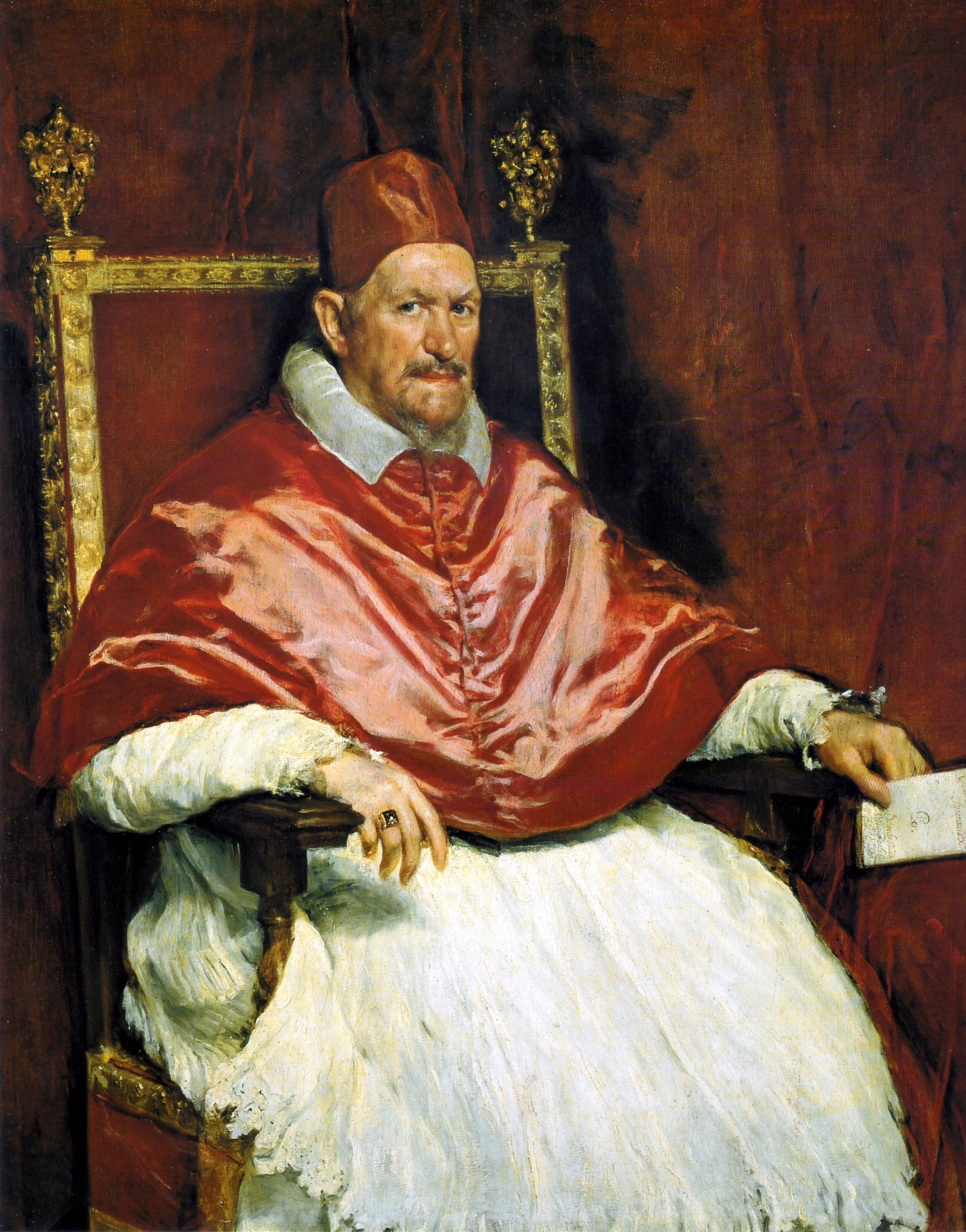
Velázquez's Portrait of Innocent X, 1650. Although Bacon avoided seeing the original, it remained the painting that most affected him, and one to which he referred over and over.

The figure is identifiable as a pope from his clothing, and seems trapped and isolated within the outlines of an abstract three-dimensional glass cage. This framing device, described by Sylvester as a "space-frame", was to feature heavily throughout Bacon's later career. A cord hangs from the upper edge of the glass case, falling in front of the pope's face and partially covering his eyes. It is too indistinctly drawn to identify with certainty, but given the presence of similar objects in Bacon's later works, may be either the end of a hanging light switch or the tassel of a curtain; the hanging cord was to become a signature for the artist. Apart from its symbolic meaning, the cord has a compositional function, framing the painting with further vertical lines. Similar objects reappear in other of his works, most prominently as the a dangling light bulb in the centre panel of his 1973 Triptych, May–June 1973. For Bacon, these elements were intended to make the figure waver in and out of sight for the viewer, alluding to the fact that bulbs can be on or off, curtains open or closed.

His mouth is opened wide as if screaming, an expression Bacon took from a still he kept of the nurse screaming in Sergei Eisenstein's Odessa Steps massacre sequence in his 1925 silent film Battleship Potemkin. In 1984, the broadcaster Melvyn Bragg asked Bacon about the still, and observed that in his earlier career the artist seemed preoccupied with the physicality of the human mouth. Bacon replied, "I had always thought that I would be able to make the mouth with all the beauty of a Monet landscape though I never succeeded in doing so." When Bragg asked why he thought he had failed, Bacon said, "It should be all much more colour, should have got more of the interior of the mouth, with all the colours of the interior of the mouth, but I didn't happen to get it." His interest in the mouth was further stimulated by a medical textbook of diseased oral cavities bought in a second-hand bookshop, which he kept in his studio and to which he often referred.

The glass cage might imply a vacuum that the figure's voice is unable to escape; as if it is screaming in silence. Rueful later in life, Bacon said that he had "wanted to paint the scream more than the horror. I think, if I had really thought about what causes somebody to really scream, it would have made the scream ... more successful". The work evokes memories of the Second World War. The glass enclosure of his 1949 Chicago Study for a Portrait is often seen as prophesying photographs of Adolf Eichmann's 1961 trial before a Jerusalem District Court, when he was held within a similar cage. Bacon strongly resisted literal comparisons though, and stated that he used the device so he could frame and "really see the image—for no other reason. I know it's been interpreted as being many other things." Other critics saw similarities between the glass case and the radio booths of late 1930s broadcasters who warned against the impending calamity. Denis Farr notes that Bacon was sympathetic to George Orwell and referred in interviews to Orwellian "shouting voices ... and trembling hands ... convey[ing] the harsh atmosphere of an interrogation."

== Influences ==
The so-called "space frame" had already been used by Alberto Giacometti in the 1930s, and the two artists became friends in the 1960s. However, Giacometti had by 1949 used it only in surrealist contexts before Bacon's adaption, and in turn influenced his use in The Cage of 1950. A similar two-dimensional construct is found in Henry Moore's works, notably his maquette for King and Queen, constructed three years after Bacon's Head. It is difficult to untangle how these artists influenced and informed each other. What is notable is that Bacon continued to use the motif, with intervals until the end of his life. Sylvester suggests his finest example is the 1970 Three Studies of the Male Back.

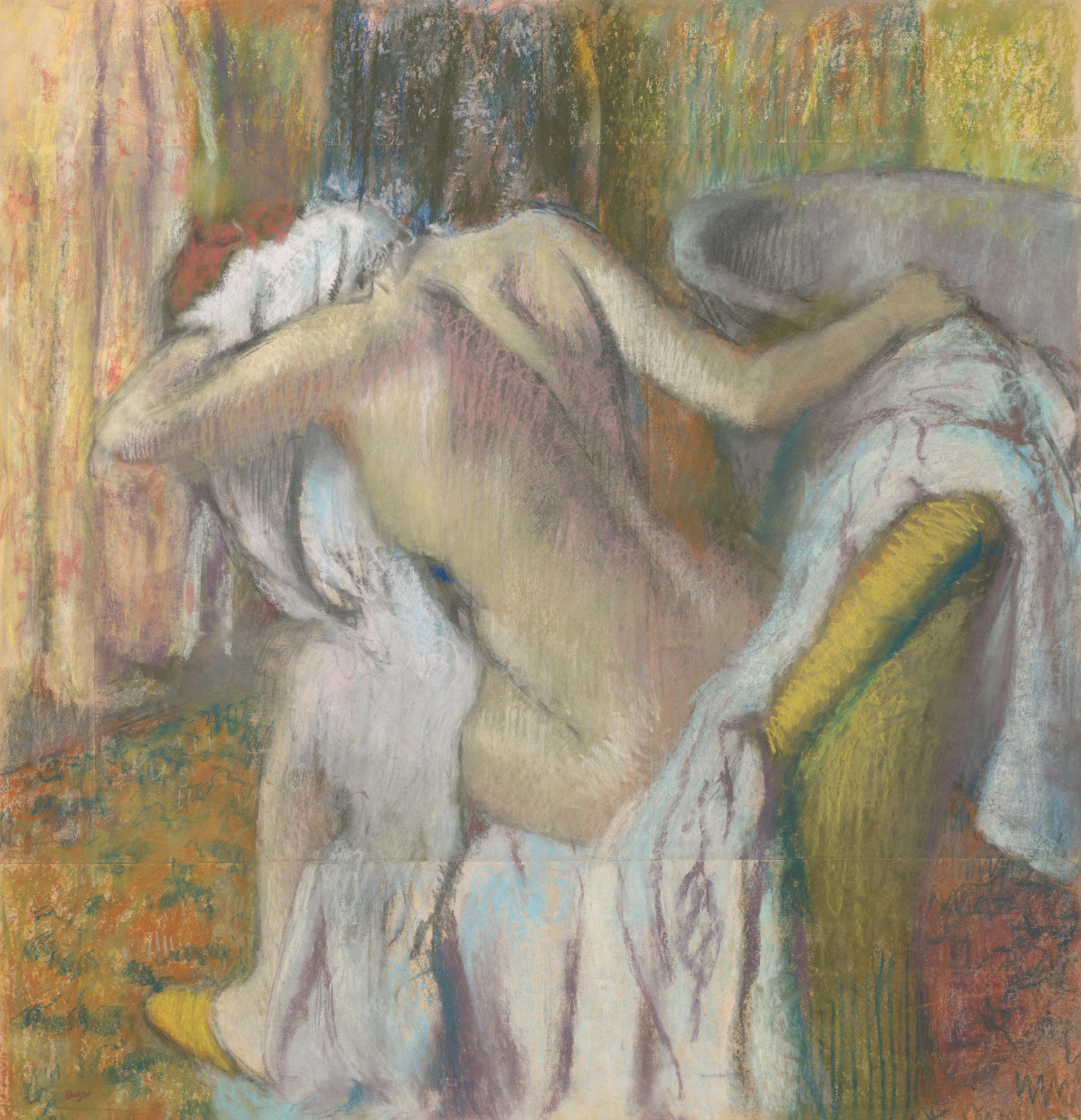
Edgar Degas, After the Bath, Woman Drying Herself, 1884

The full-length golden curtain-like folds painted in heavy brush strokes are in part influenced by Degas but also similar to Titian's 1558 Portrait of Cardinal Filippo Archinto. Bacon adapts the Old Master's device to isolate and distance the sitter from the viewer; the black ground-paint is visible through the folds, making the separation all the more affecting. Bacon had already used similar forms in his Chicago panel. They were to become a feature of his most acclaimed 1950s works, especially in his "screaming popes". He became fascinated with the veil or curtain as a motif in painting. He collected many reproductions of works by Titian and Degas in which it is employed. He had begun his career as an interior decorator and designer of furniture and rugs in the mid-1930s, and later said that he liked "rooms hung all round with just curtains hung in even folds". Veils or curtains appear in Bacon's earliest works, notably the 1949 Study from the Human Body, always in portraits and always in front of, rather than behind, the figure.

Head VI is closely modelled on Velázquez's c. 1650 Portrait of Innocent X, today in the Doria Pamphilj Gallery, Rome. Bacon cautiously avoided seeing the original, even when he spent three months in Rome in 1954. Critics speculate he was afraid of being disappointed, or thought that an intimate knowledge of the painting would dull his imagination. Yet his fascination was all-consuming, and he reproduced variants of it obsessively for almost two decades – an examination and homage described as "without parallel in the history of art". Bacon's approach differs from Velázquez's in a number of ways: both artists were expressive, yet Bacon's broad brush-strokes and freedom with paint contrast with Velázquez's tight and controlled treatment. He adapts Velázquez's positioning of the pope to place him above the viewer's point of view, elevating and distancing him. This was already a common technique in commercial, promotional photography but in Bacon's hands, art historian Weiland Schmied argues, the angle places the pope on a kind of stage for the viewer to coldly observe.

Although Bacon revered Velázquez's portrait, he did not try to reproduce the earlier painting. In interviews, he said that he saw flaws in Velázquez's work and that he viewed that social structure and order as, according to Schmied, "obsolete and decayed". Bacon's approach was to elevate his subject so he could knock him down again, thereby making a sly comment on the treatment of royalty in both Old Master and contemporary painting. Yet Velázquez's influence is apparent in many aspects of the painting. The sitter's pose closely echoes the original, as does the violet and white colouring of his cope, which is built up through broad, thick, brush-strokes. The influence can be further seen in the gold-coloured ornaments on the back of the seat that extend on both sides of the figure. Art historian Armin Zweite describes the work as a mixture of reverence and subversion that pays tribute to Velázquez, while at the same time deconstructs his painting.

Sylvester detects the influence of late works by Titian in other aspects, especially in the deep and rich colouring, and Velázquez's portrayals of Philip IV, such as Portrait of Philip IV in Fraga, and agrees with identification of pastels of Degas as a source. He believes Bacon borrowed from Degas the use of parallel heavy folds to create the illusion of what Degas described as "shuttering", as seen in the earlier artist's After the Bath, Woman drying herself. Sylvester makes a further direct link between the folds and the transparent veil in Titian's Portrait of Cardinal Filippo Archinto. He believes the folds serve to "push the viewer back", creating a distance from the subject, an effect he sees as similar to the separation between an orchestra and setting; others view the folds as more closely resembling the bars of a prison. Sylvester describes them as an accentuation of background verticals into stripes that are made to appear as if they pass through the sitter. In his series of books "Interviews with Francis Bacon", he asked Bacon why he found the effect so poignant. The artist replied, "Well, it means that the sensation doesn't come straight out at you but slides slowly and gently through the gaps."

When asked why he was compelled to revisit the Velázquez so often, Bacon replied that he had nothing against popes per se, but merely sought "an excuse to use these colours, and you can't give ordinary clothes that purple colour without getting into a sort of false fauve manner." Schmied sees Head VI as a reaction against Velázquez, and a commentary on how the papacy is "obsolete and decayed", with a pope resistant to both modernisation and secularisation. To him, the figure seems to "resist the maltreatment of image and tries to halt the impending collapse of the established work order. He screams and grimaces, clutching at arms of his throne." Sylvester notes that Bacon was impressed by Picasso's figuration and handling of paint, especially in Picasso's 1930s works; and suggests that the white blobs around the pope's cape may be influenced by the 1913 Woman in a Slip Seated in an Armchair.

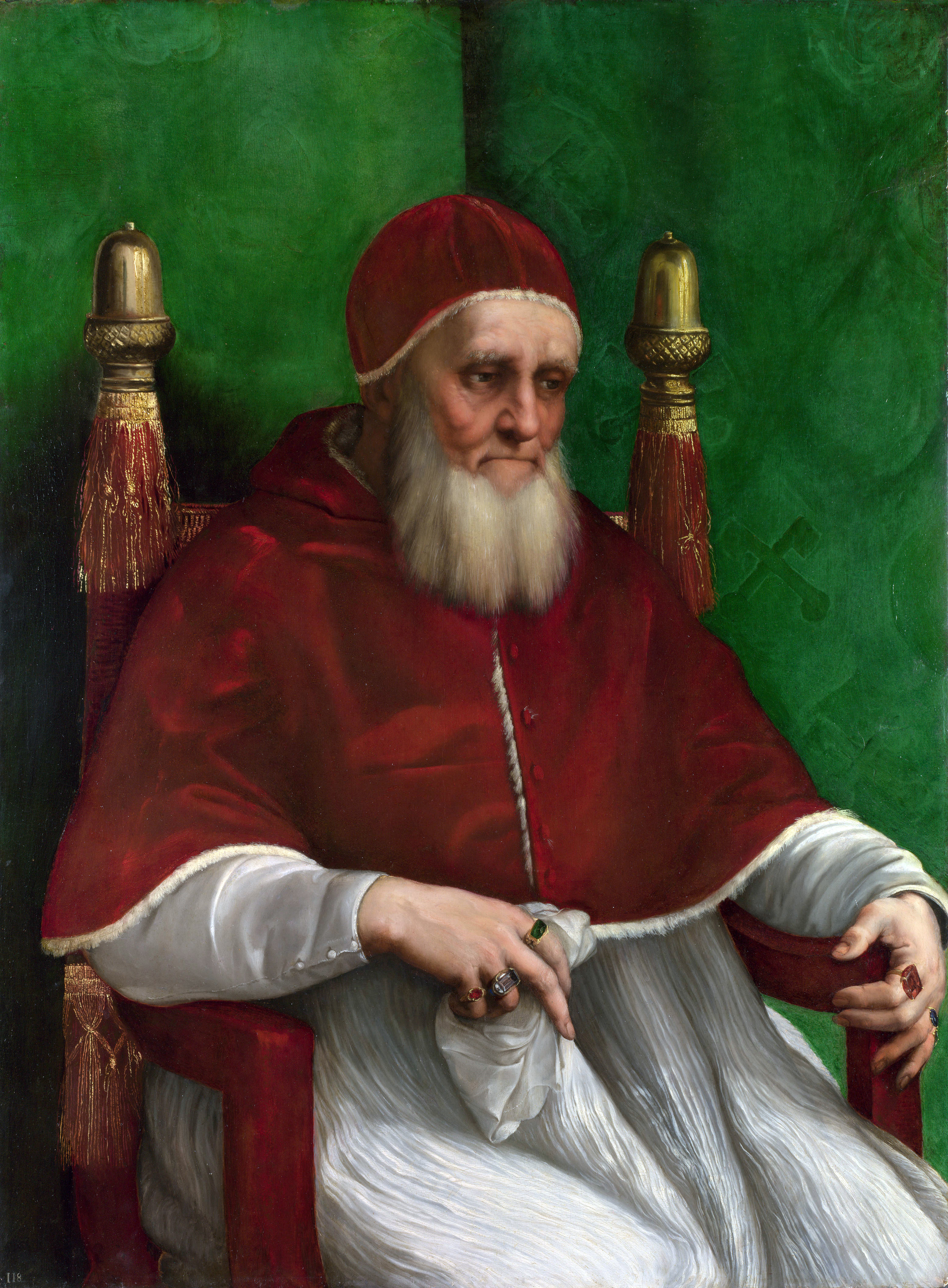
Raphael, Portrait of Pope Julius II, 1511–12

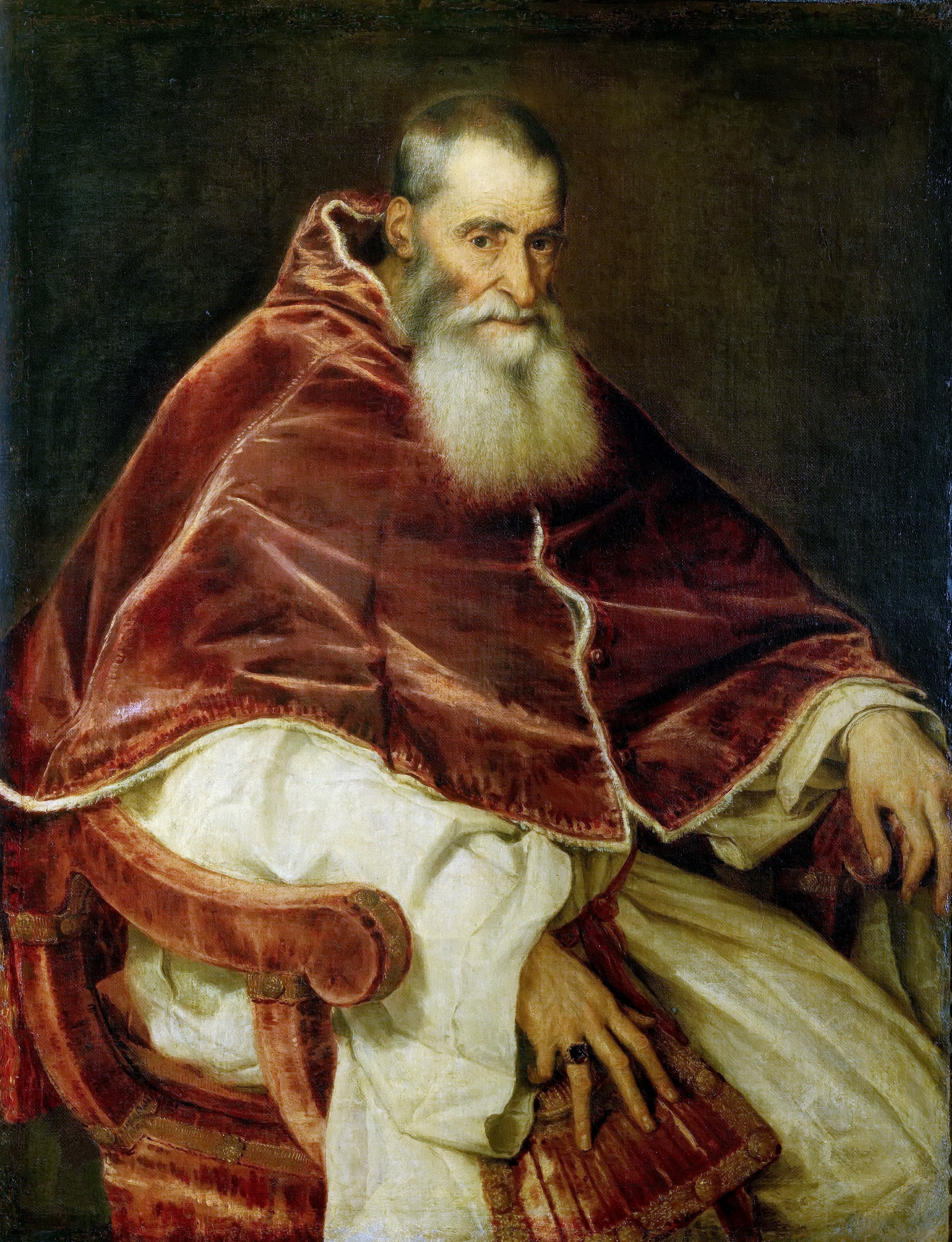
Titian, Portrait of Pope Paul III, 1543

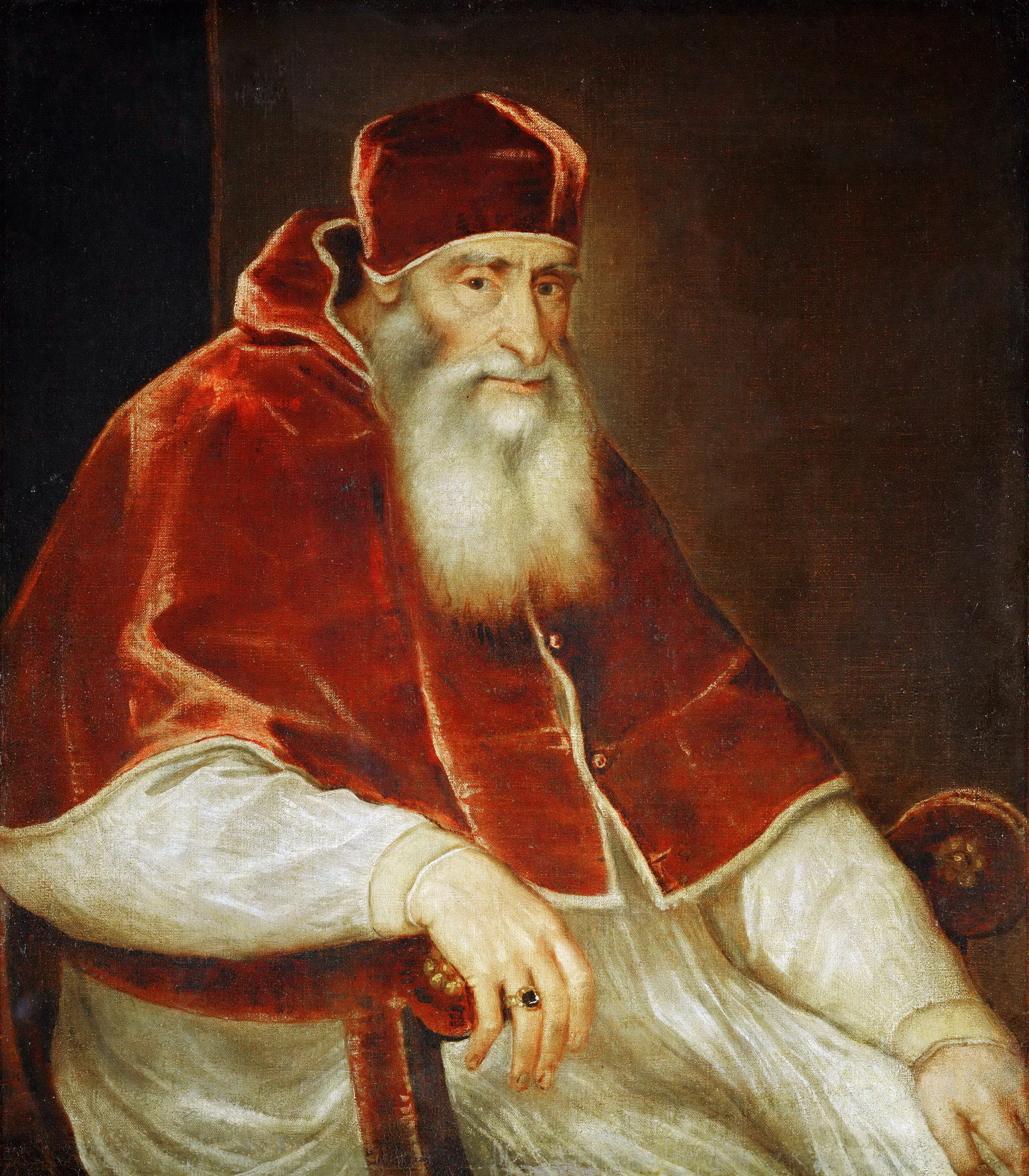
Titian, Portrait of Pope Paul III, 1545–46

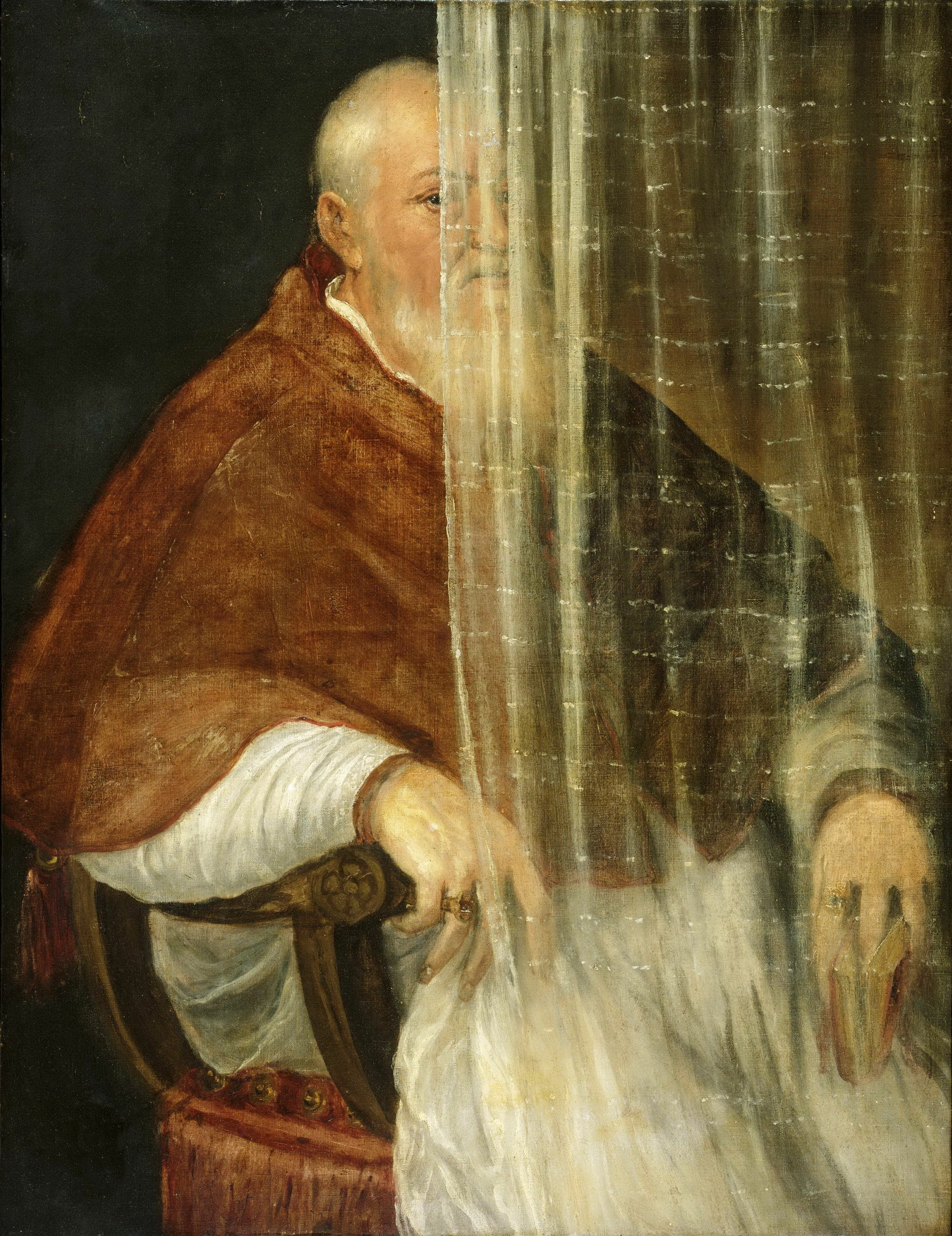
Titian, Portrait of Cardinal Filippo Archinto, 1558

== Critical reception ==
When Bacon undertook the series late in 1948, he was something of a two-hit wonder. He had had success in 1944 with Three Studies for Figures at the Base of a Crucifixion and to a lesser extent with Painting (1946), both of which were highly regarded but viewed as sensationalist. The exhibition was a success, and marked his critical breakthrough. Until then, he had been highly regarded but capable of only occasional brilliance. While some found his images horrifying and unnerving, they wrote about him all the same, sealing his reputation as the enfant terrible of post-war British art. The critic for The Observer wrote, "The recent paintings ... horrifying as they are, cannot be ignored. Technically they are superb, and the masterly handling of large areas of pearly grey, flushed with a sudden pink or green, only makes me regret the more that the artist's gift should have been brought to subjects so esoteric".

Most critics focused on Head I and Head VI, remarking favourably on the progression between the two. While some found their inherent violence distasteful, Brausen was a skilled publicist and turned this bad press into notoriety and brought Bacon's work to national attention. Peppiatt notes that the exhibition showed that Bacon no longer needed sensationalist material to make an impact. He further wrote that Bacon was then capable of evoking an intense emotional response through more subtle means and had found a way of presenting the human condition "in a vestigial setting, a cage or [behind] a parted curtain...the rest, the most essential, lay in the manipulation of the infinitely suggestive medium of oil paint".

After the show Bacon gradually became "less the outsider with an occasional image of horrifying brilliance and more a force to be reckoned with on the contemporary scene". His reputation and the value of his panels rose dramatically, and after the showing, he was sought after by European, American and African collectors and galleries, commanding prices as high as £400 for single works; unusual for a British artist of the time.

== Provenance ==
Head VI was first exhibited at the Hanover Gallery, London, in 1949. It was acquired by the Arts Council's Hayward Gallery in 1952. The Hayward has loaned it out a number of times since, including for major retrospectives at the Grand Palais, Paris, in 1971, and the Hugh Lane Gallery, Dublin, in 2000.

In May 1996, the National Gallery took on loan Velázquez's Innocent X portrait and hung it alongside four Bacon paintings; Head VI, Pope I (1951), Pope 1961 and Pope 1965. Peppiatt believes that Bacon would have disapproved of such a showing with a work he considered one of the finest ever painted, but writes that two, including Head VI, "stood up to it, and even enhanced its authority as one of the most penetrating studies of human nature and human power".
