= Study after Velázquez's Portrait of Pope Innocent X =

1953 painting by Francis Bacon

- Artist: Francis Bacon
- Year: 1953
- Type: Oil on canvas
- Subject: Pope Innocent X
- Dimensions: 153 cm × 118 cm (60 in × 46 in)
- Location: Des Moines Art Center, Des Moines

Study after Velázquez's Portrait of Pope Innocent X is a 1953 painting by Irish-British artist Francis Bacon. It shows a distorted version of Pope Innocent X, head of the Catholic Church from 1644 to 1655, as depicted in Spanish artist Diego Velázquez's Portrait of Innocent X (c. 1650). After Head VI (1949), the work is one of the first (Note: Bacon's first fully realised pope is 1949's Head VI.) in a series of around 50 variants of Velázquez's portrait which Bacon painted from 1949 to 1971.

Of the old masters, Bacon favoured Velázquez, Titian, Rembrandt, and Francisco Goya's late works. He kept an extensive inventory of images for source material but preferred not to confront the major works in person. Having deliberately avoided it for years, he saw Portrait of Innocent X in person only much later in his life.

Study after Velázquez's Portrait has been the subject of detailed analysis by several scholars. David Sylvester described it as, along with Head VI, "the finest pope Bacon produced".

== Pope series ==
Velázquez was commissioned by Innocent X to paint the portrait as from life, the pope's motive being to increase his prestige. However, Velázquez did not flatter his sitter, and the painting is noted for its realism. It is an unflinching portrait of a highly intelligent and shrewd but aging man.

Bacon never painted from life, preferring to use a variety of visual source material, including photographs taken from film stills, medical textbooks and 19th-century journals and those commissioned from his friend John Deakin. Equally, Bacon rarely worked from commission and could portray the pope in an even less flattering light; according to art critic Armin Zweite, "in a sinister manner, in cavernous dungeons, afflicted by an emotional outburst and devoid of any authority". (Note: Excerpting 1982's Three Studies for Portrait (Mick Jagger), a series he produced specifically for showings at the Hanover Gallery in the late 1940s and early 1950s.)

Although Bacon avoided seeing the original, the painting remained the single most significant influence on his work; its presence is evident in many of his best works from the late 1940s to the early 1960s. In Bacon's version of the 17th-century masterpiece, the Pope is shown screaming, yet his voice is "silenced" by the enclosing drapes and dark, rich colours. The dark background lends a grotesque and nightmarish tone to the painting. Although a noted bon vivant, Bacon closely guarded his private life, working habits, and thought processes. He produced some 50 paintings of popes but destroyed a great many that he was unhappy with.

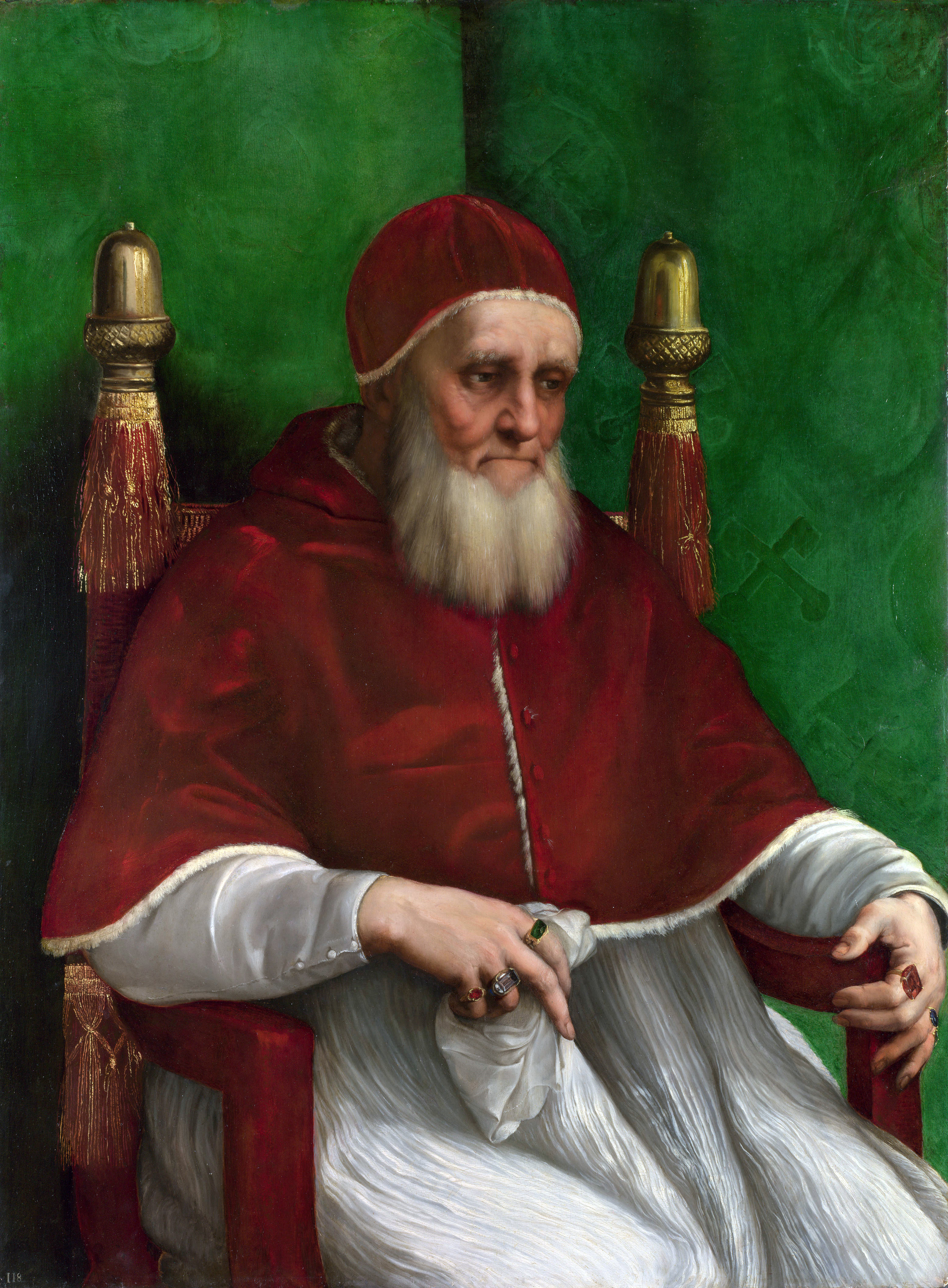
Raphael, Portrait of Pope Julius II, 1511–12. National Gallery, London

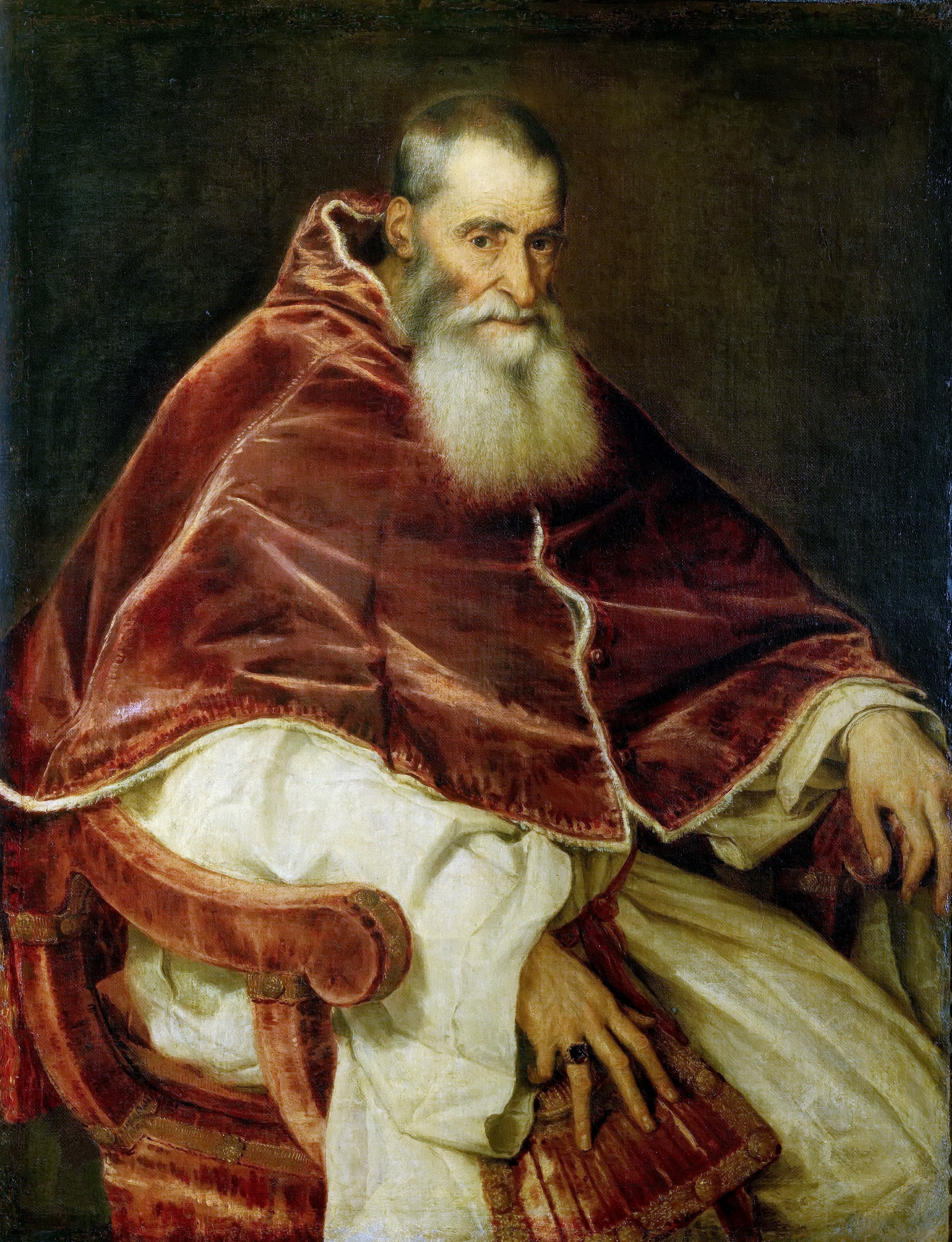
Titian, Portrait of Pope Paul III, 1545–46

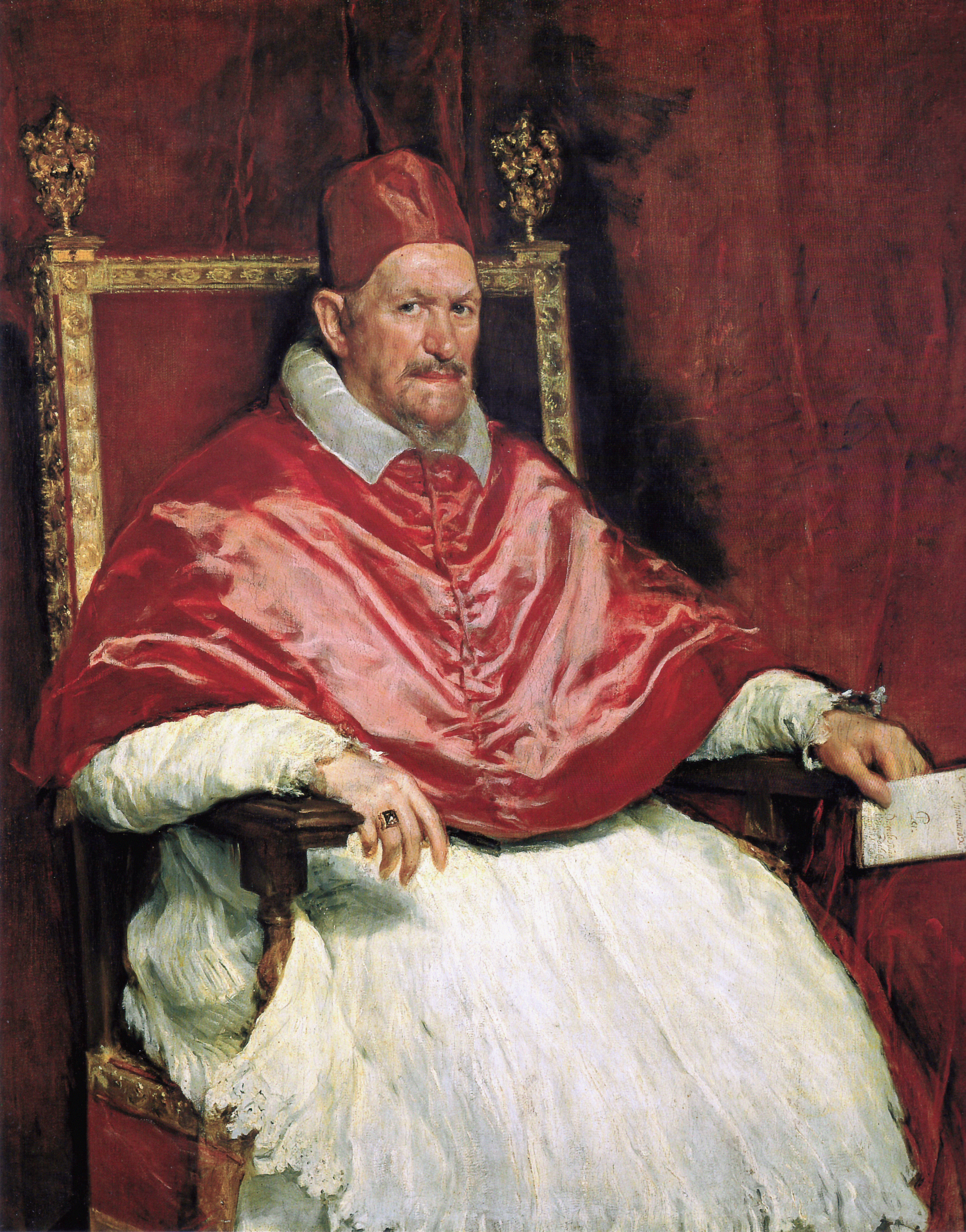
Diego Velázquez, Portrait of Innocent X, 1650. Galleria Doria Pamphilj, Rome

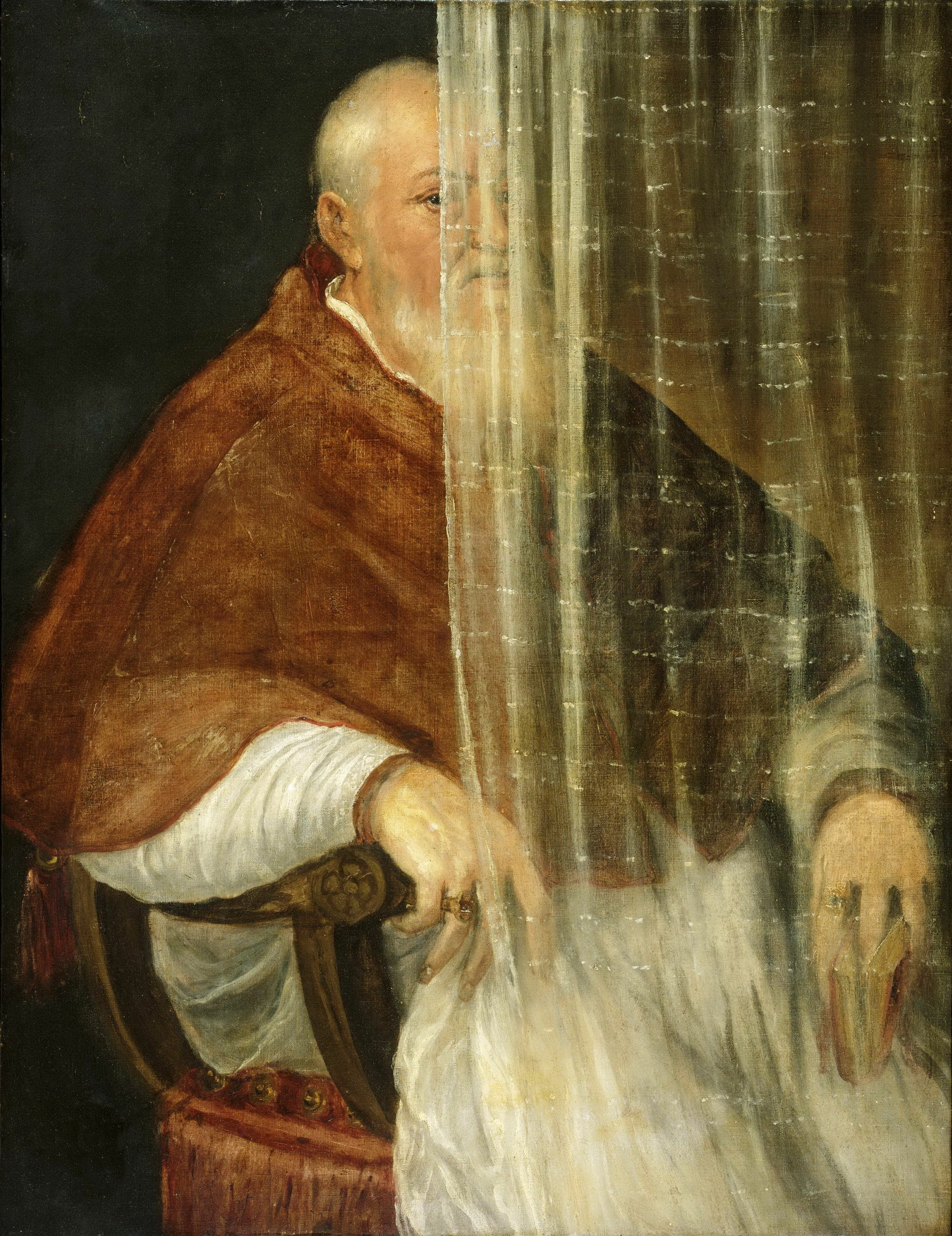
Titian, Portrait of Cardinal Filippo Archinto, 1558. Philadelphia Museum of Art

== Description and themes ==
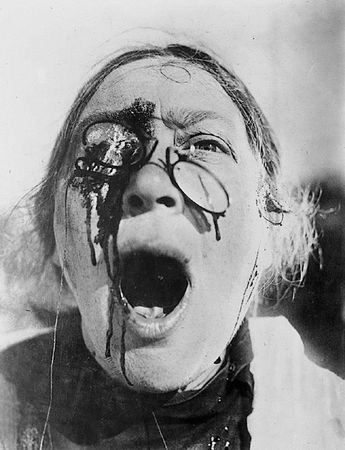
Still from Sergei Eisenstein's 1925 silent film The Battleship Potemkin. Bacon called the image a key catalyst for his work.

As with many of Bacon's popes, the painting is dominated by purple vestments. Bacon's palette changed in 1953, and his paintings became darker. The earlier blues were replaced by velvet purples, and his overall tone became more nocturnal. The soft-focus and filled-in backgrounds disappeared, replaced by flat dark spaces, which in some cases were merely the untreated blank canvas. The pleated curtains of the backdrop are rendered transparent and appear to fall through and encircle the Pope's screaming face.

Although his earlier works were dominated by harsh orange pigments, they were hardly cheerful; it has been suggested a reason his palette became darker is that he was scarred by the ending of his tumultuous and sometimes violent relationship with Peter Lacy, whom he later described as the love of his life. This partly explains why Bacon began to focus on representations of father figures such as popes - Lacy was a much older and accomplished man and had been the dominant partner.

The man is identifiable as a pope from his clothing. He seems trapped and isolated within the outlines of an abstract three-dimensional glass cage. The framing device, described by Sylvester as a "space-frame", features heavily throughout Bacon's later career.

=== Cage ===
Horizontal metal frames and draped curtains often featured in Bacon's 1950s and 1960s paintings. The motif may have been borrowed from the sculptors Alberto Giacometti and Henry Moore, both of whom Bacon greatly admired; he often corresponded and met with Giacometti. Giacometti had employed the device in The Nose (1947) and The Cage (1950), while Moore used similar frames in his 1952 bronze Maquette for King and Queen. Bacon's use of frames suggests imprisonment to many critics.

=== Vertical folds ===
The vertical folds resemble curtains. Veils, curtains, and similar structures appear in Bacon's earliest works, notably the 1949 Study from the Human Body, always in front of, rather than behind, the figure. Their source may be Titian's 1558 Portrait of Cardinal Filippo Archinto.

The folds emphasise the figure's isolation and were drawn from devices used by Edgar Degas in the late 19th century, which Bacon described as "shuttering". Bacon said that, to him, the device meant that the "sensation doesn't come straight out at you but slides slowly and gently across".

== Meaning ==
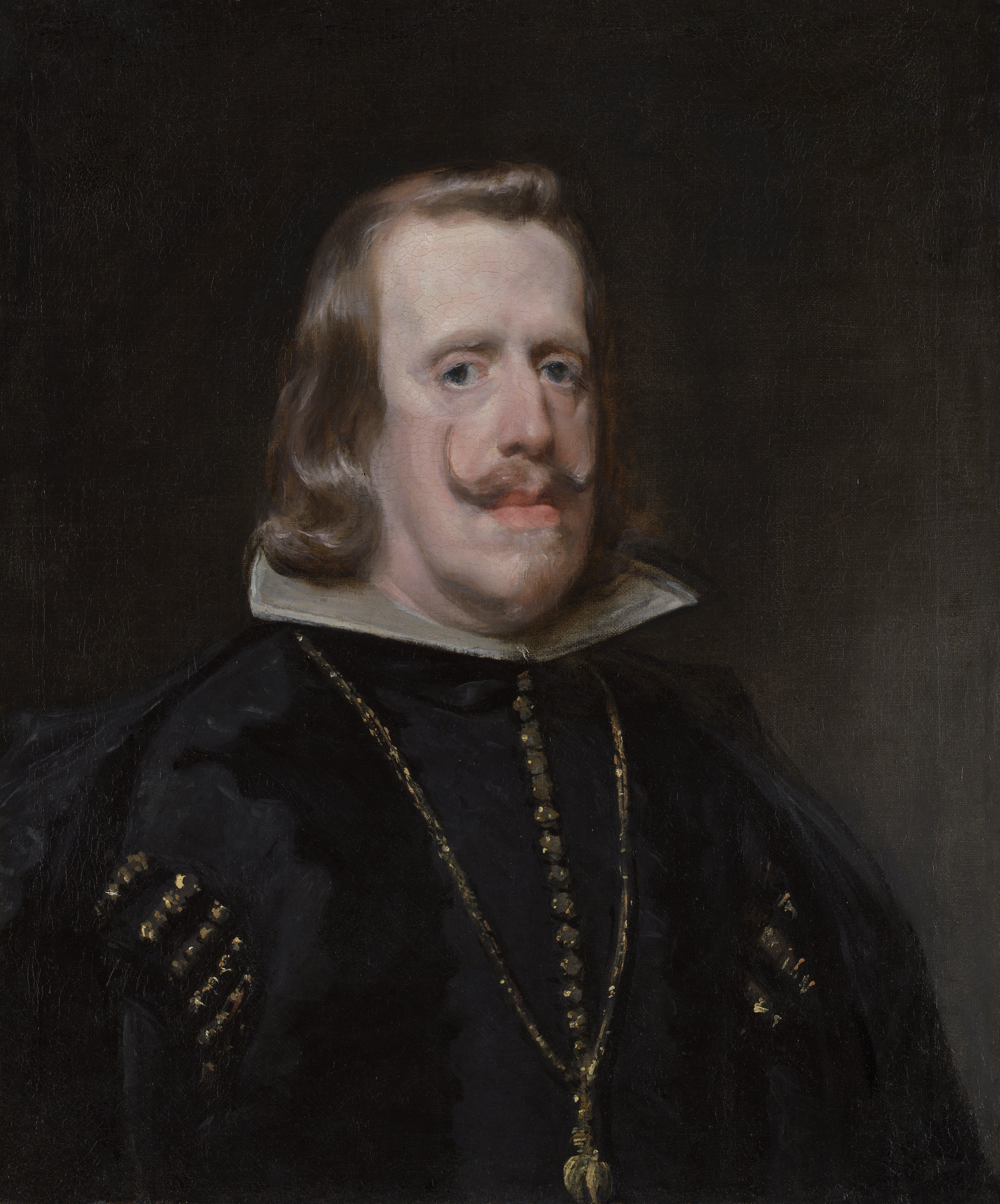
Diego Velázquez, Philip IV of Spain, 1656

When asked why he was compelled to revisit Velázquez's Portrait again and again, Bacon replied that he had nothing against popes but merely sought "an excuse to use these colours, and you can't give ordinary clothes that purple colour without getting into a sort of false fauve manner". At the time Bacon was coming to terms with the death of a cold, disciplinarian father, his early, illicit sexual encounters, and a very destructive sadomasochistic approach to sex.

Almost all the popes are depicted within cage-like structures, screaming or about to scream. Bacon identified as a Nietzschean and atheist, and some contemporary critics saw the series as symbolic execution scenes as if Bacon sought to enact Friedrich Nietzsche's declaration that "God is dead" by killing his representative on Earth. Other critics see the series as symbolising the killing of a father figure. However, Bacon balked at such literal translations and said that it was Velázquez himself he sought to "triumph over". He said that in the same way that Velázquez cooled Titian, he sought to "cool" Velázquez.

== Provenance ==
The painting was given to Carter Burden as a wedding present by his uncle, William A. M. Burden, and it hung in the entrance hall of Carter and Amanda Burden's Dakota apartment directly opposite the front door. The painting was included in the 1974 exhibition Selected Works from the Collection of Carter Burden at Marlborough Gallery in New York.

It was purchased by the Des Moines Art Center in 1980 with funds from the Coffin Fine Arts Trust and is currently displayed there.

== See also ==
- Head VI, 1949
- List of paintings by Francis Bacon
