= Toto Koopman =

Dutch-Javanese model, intelligence agent and gallerist (1908–1991)

- Born: Catharina Johanna Anne Koopman; 28 October 1908; Salatiga, Dutch East Indies
- Died: 27 August 1991 (aged 82); London, UK
- Occupations: Model; intelligence agent; gallerist; archaeologist
- Partner: Erica Brausen (from 1945)
- Relatives: Ody Koopman (brother)

Catharina "Toto" Johanna Anne Koopman (28 October 1908 – 27 August 1991) was a Dutch-Javanese model, intelligence agent, gallerist and archaeologist. During the Second World War, Koopman worked as a spy for both the Italian Resistance and the Allied powers and was deported to Ravensbrück concentration camp. Koopman later settled in London and established the Hanover Gallery with her partner Erica Brausen.

== Early life and education ==
Koopman was born Catharina Johanna Anne Koopman in Salatiga, Dutch East Indies (present-day Indonesia) to Jan George Koopman (1878–1941) and Catharina Johanna Westrik (1880–1933). Koopman's Dutch father was a Colonel in the Royal Netherlands East Indies Army, and her mother was of Chinese Indonesian descent. The younger sister of the tennis player Ody Koopman, Koopman was known from birth as "Toto" after her father's favourite horse.

Koopman left Java in 1920 to attend a boarding school in the Netherlands where she developed a talent for languages and became fluent in English, French, German and Italian. After a year at an English finishing school, she moved to Paris to work as a model.

== Career ==
In Paris, Koopman worked as a house model for Coco Chanel but quit after only six months. She worked for the designers Rochas, Mainbocher and Madeleine Vionnet, appeared regularly in Vogue Paris and was photographed by Edward Steichen and George Hoyningen-Huene.

Koopman had a small part in the film The Private Life of Don Juan and although this was cut from the final production she still attended the film's premiere with Tallulah Bankhead, who introduced her to Lord Beaverbrook. Although Beaverbrook was thirty years her senior, he and Koopman began, in 1934, an affair that lasted some years. He was happy to pay for her travels throughout Europe in the 1930s and she often attended opera performances in Germany and Italy. When Beaverbrook discovered that Koopman was also in a relationship with his son, Max Aitken, he ran a series of stories in the newspapers he owned, including the Daily Express and the London Evening Standard, that made Koopman an outcast in London high-society. Koopman and the younger Aitken lived together for four years but he ended the relationship when she refused to marry him. In fact Koopman had signed an agreement with Beaverbrook which granted her a pension for life from him provided she did not marry his son.

== World War II ==
Koopman left London in 1939 to live in Italy. There she began a relationship with a leader of the anti-Mussolini resistance. When World War II broke out, she agreed to use her contacts and language skills to spy for the Italian Resistance. She infiltrated meetings of the Black Shirts but was captured. After spells in prisons in Milan and Lazio she was sent to the Massa Martina detention camp but escaped and hid in the mountains around Perugia, where she worked with a local resistance group. She was recaptured, promptly escaped again, and made her way to Venice. There, in October 1944, Koopman was caught spying on high-ranking German officers in the Danieli Hotel and quickly deported to the Ravensbrück concentration camp. Very shortly before the camp was liberated in April 1945, the Nazi authorities released several hundred prisoners, including Koopman, to the care of the Red Cross in Sweden. A former boyfriend, Randolph Churchill went to Gothenburg and helped the emaciated Koopman obtain new clothes, a new passport and a wig for her shaved head.

== Later years and death ==
While recuperating in Ascona in 1945, Koopman met the art dealer Erica Brausen. The two became lovers and would remain together for the rest of their lives. Brausen was about to open her own commercial gallery in London, and the two women worked to get the Hanover Gallery established. In due course the Hanover became one of the most influential galleries in Europe, most notably by nurturing the early career of Francis Bacon. During the 1950s Koopman studied at the University of London and took part in several archaeological excavations. She made a donation of books to the Institute of Archaeology in London. In 1959 Koopman and Brausen bought a property on the island of Panarea where they built six villas amongst extensive gardens and entertained very lavishly. They continued to live together until Koopman's death in August 1991, eighteen months before Brausen's death.
