= Head I =

1948 painting by Francis Bacon

- Artist: Francis Bacon
- Year: 1948
- Medium: Oil on canvas
- Dimensions: 100.3 cm × 74.9 cm (39.5 in × 29.5 in)
- Location: Collection of Richard S. Zeisler; New York

Head I is a small oil and tempera on hardboard painting by the Irish-born British figurative artist Francis Bacon. Completed in 1948, it is the first in a series of six heads, the remainder of which were painted the following year in preparation for a November 1949 exhibition at the Hanover Gallery in London.

Bacon began the Head series out of necessity; he was granted the 1949 exhibition at the Hayward a year in advance, but had not painted at all in 1947, and had only a few works he was happy with from 1948. Over time, the series became something quite apart from his initial idea; Head VI turned into the first of his many examinations of Velázquez's c. 1650 Portrait of Innocent X.

== Description ==
Like the others in the series, it shows a screaming figure alone in a room, and focuses on the open mouth. The work shows a skull which has disintegrated on itself and is largely a formless blob of flesh. The entire upper half has disappeared, leaving only the jaw, mouth and teeth and one ear still intact. It is the first of Bacon's paintings to feature gold background railings or bars; later to become a prominent feature of his 1950s work, especially in the papal portraits where they would often appear as enclosing or cages around the figures. It is not known what influences were behind the image; most likely they were multiple – press or war photography, and critic Denis Farr detects the influence of Matthias Grünewald.

Bacon juxtaposes traditional elements of portraiture with loose, spontaneous brushwork. In some passages he has rubbed or brushed out (perhaps with a cloth) the paint, a technique art historian Armin Zweite describes as "productive vandalism". There are a number of ambiguous elements in the work. The hanging tassel rest just above the figure's right ear, giving the impression that it has hooked the head and is pulling it sideways. The gold railings suggest in the top right suggest the corner of a room, while those in the center background may be the headboard of a bed. The upper half is largely void of detail, while the lower portion, particularly the lower third has been heavily reworked, and consists of a blending of white, gray and black pigments.

The use of heavy impasto gives the impression of animal skin; critic Robert Melville described the "color of wet, black snakes lightly powdered with dust". In 1951 Bacon said of his choice of colour and gloss; "One of the problems is to paint like Velázquez, but with the texture of a hippopotamus skin", and later "I had an idea in those days that textures should be very much thicker, and therefore the texture of, for instance a rhinoceros skin would help me to think about the texture of the human skin". Furthering this impression, the mouth and teeth resemble those of a howling fanged animal.

== See also ==
- List of paintings by Francis Bacon

== Sources ==
- Davies, Hugh; Yard, Sally. Francis Bacon. New York: Cross River Press, 1986. ISBN 978-0-89659-447-0
- Dawson, Barbara; Sylvester, David. Francis Bacon in Dublin. London: Thames & Hudson, 2000. ISBN 978-0-500-28254-0
- Farr, Dennis; Peppiatt, Michael; Yard, Sally. Francis Bacon: A Retrospective. NY: Harry N Abrams, 1999. ISBN 978-0-8109-2925-8
- Peppiatt, Michael. Anatomy of an Enigma. London: Westview Press, 1996. ISBN 978-0-8133-3520-9
- Russell, John. Francis Bacon (World of Art). NY: Norton, 1971. ISBN 978-0-500-20169-5
- Sylvester, David. Looking back at Francis Bacon. London: Thames and Hudson, 2000. ISBN 0500019940
- Zweite, Armin (ed). The Violence of the Real. London: Thames and Hudson, 2006. ISBN 0-500-09335-0
