= Ody Koopman =

Dutch–Javanese tennis player (1902–1949)

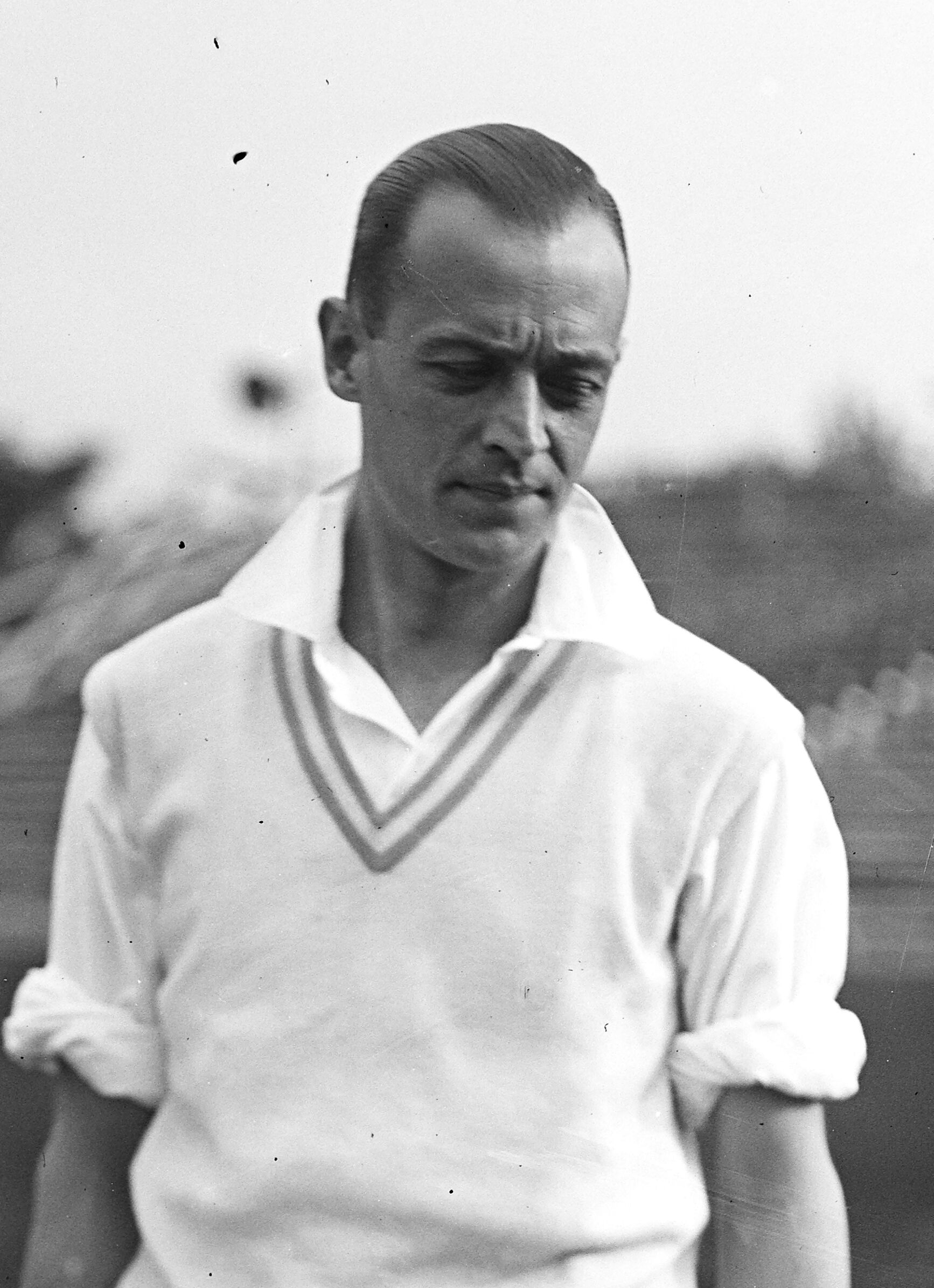
- Koopman in 1928
- Full name: Henri Lodewijk George Koopman
- Country (sports): Netherlands
- Born: 19 July 1902 Salatiga, Dutch East Indies
- Died: 20 May 1949 (aged 46) Mendrisio, Switzerland

Henri Lodewijk George "Ody" Koopman (19 July 1902 – 20 May 1949) was a Dutch–Javanese tennis player.

== Early life ==
Koopman was born Henri Lodewijk George Koopman in Salatiga, Dutch East Indies (present-day Indonesia) to Jan George Koopman (1878–1941) and Catharina Johanna Westrik (1880–1933). Koopman's father was a Dutch Colonel in the Royal Netherlands East Indies Army, and his mother was of Chinese Indonesian descent. Koopman's younger sister was the model, spy and gallerist Toto Koopman.

== Career ==
Koopman was four times Dutch champion. In 1930, he won the title in the mixed doubles with Mence Canters. In 1931, 1932 (both with Joop Knottenbelt and in 1933 (with Hendrik Timmer) he won the gentlemen's double. He competed in 1931 and 1934 at the Wimbledon tournament. In 1931 he reached the third round at Wimbledon, losing to Cam Malfroy of New Zealand 5–7, 3–6, 4–6.

Koopman was a member of the Dutch Davis Cup team in the days of the Dutch champion Henk Timmer.

== Personal life ==
On 6 January 1925, Koopman married Anna Enthoven before later divorcing in 1928. On 28 January 1930, Koopman married Elisabeth Haas with whom he had two sons.

Although not divorced from his second wife, in 1949 Koopman lived with a girlfriend and their baby in Ascona, Switzerland. In May of that year his girlfriend was found murdered and Koopman was missing. He was tracked down and arrested a week later, and died a couple of days later of 'total exhaustion' in a mental institute in Mendrisio.
