= Head II =

Painting by Francis Bacon

- Artist: Francis Bacon
- Year: 1949
- Medium: Oil on canvas
- Dimensions: 80.5 cm × 65 cm (31.7 in × 26 in)
- Location: Ulster Museum; Belfast

Head II is an oil and tempera on hardboard painting by the Irish-born British figurative artist Francis Bacon, from 1948. It the second in a series of six heads, painted from the winter of 1948 in preparation for a November 1949 exhibition at the Hanover Gallery, London.

== Description ==
The figure seems half human, half animal, and has disintegrated to an extent that, like the preceding Head I of the series, the entire upper head has disappeared, leaving only mouth and jaw. The figure is set in a shallow pictorial space, and is positioned behind curtains that borrow from Titian's 1558 Portrait of Cardinal Filippo Archinto. The curtains are fastened at one point by a safety pin. John Russell sees the curtains as enclosing the figure, as if the walls of a prison or execution dock. Remarking on their dreary and drab appearance, he further speculates that they seem "stiffened by fifty years' crassness of a tenth-rate lodging-house; or they could be sliding shutters that have been pulled apart to admit a new victim."

The painting's overall grisaille appearance gives the impression of x-ray photographs, and K.C. Clark's Positioning may have inspired the look in Radiography, a book Bacon often acknowledged as a key source for his work. The painting contains a small arrow just below the figure's mouth; the first appearance of a motif the artist was to continue using for the rest of his career.

== See also ==
- List of paintings by Francis Bacon

== Sources ==
- Dawson, Barbara; Sylvester, David. Francis Bacon in Dublin. London: Thames & Hudson, 2000. ISBN 978-0-500-28254-0
- Farr, Dennis; Peppiatt, Michael; Yard, Sally. Francis Bacon: A Retrospective. NY: Harry N Abrams, 1999. ISBN 978-0-8109-2925-8
- Peppiatt, Michael. Anatomy of an Enigma. London: Westview Press, 1996. ISBN 978-0-8133-3520-9
- Russell, John. Francis Bacon (World of Art). NY: Norton, 1971. ISBN 978-0-500-20169-5
