= Tate Publishing Ltd =

Tate Publishing
- Parent company: Tate Gallery
- Founded: 1911
- Country of origin: United Kingdom
- Headquarters location: London
- Distribution: self-distributed (UK); Interart (France); Exhibitions International (Belgium); Roli Books (India); David Krut (South Africa); Abrams Books (US); Thames & Hudson (Australia)
- Publication types: Books
- Nonfiction topics: Art
- Official website: www.tate.org.uk/about-us/tate-publishing

Tate Publishing is a publisher of visual arts books, associated with the Tate Gallery in London, England. It was established in 1911; nowadays it is a division of Tate Enterprises Ltd, an independent company wholly owned by the Trustees of Tate, and is based at Tate Britain, Millbank, London. In 2001, it produced 30 new book titles and had gross sales of £4 million, a large increase over previous years due to the opening of the Tate Modern branch of the Tate Gallery.
