= Painting 1946 =

1946 painting by Francis Bacon

- Artist: Francis Bacon
- Year: 1946
- Catalogue: 79204
- Type: Oil on linen
- Dimensions: 198 cm × 132 cm (78 in × 52 in)
- Location: Museum of Modern Art, New York
- Accession: 229.1948

Painting 1946, also known as Painting or Painting (1946), is an oil-on-linen painting by the Ireland-born British artist Francis Bacon. It was originally intended to depict a chimpanzee in long grass (parts of which may be still visible); Bacon then attempted to paint a bird of prey landing in a field. Bacon described the work as his most unconscious, the figurations forming without his intention.

In 1945, Nicolas Poussin's painting The Adoration of the Golden Calf (1633–1634) had been taken into the National Gallery collection and Bacon almost certainly had this painting in the back of his mind in respect of the garlands, the calf (now slaughtered) and the tented Israelite encampment, now transmuted into an umbrella.

Graham Sutherland saw Painting 1946 in the Cromwell Place studio, and urged his dealer, Erica Brausen, then of the Redfern Gallery, to go to see the painting and to buy it. Brausen wrote to Bacon several times and visited his studio in the early Autumn of 1946, promptly buying the work for £200. It was shown in several group showings, including the British section of Exposition internationale d'arte moderne (18 November – 28 December 1946) at the Musée National d'Art Moderne, for which Bacon travelled to Paris.

Within a fortnight of the sale of Painting 1946 to the Hanover gallery, Bacon had used the proceeds to decamp from London to Monte Carlo. After staying at a succession of hotels and flats, including the Hôtel de Ré, Bacon settled in a large villa, La Frontalière, in the hills above the town. Eric Hall and Nanny Lightfoot would come to stay. Bacon spent much of the next few years in Monte Carlo, apart from short visits to London. From Monte Carlo, Bacon wrote to Graham Sutherland and Erica Brausen. His letters to Erica Brausen show that he did paint there, but no paintings are known to survive.

In 1948, Painting 1946 sold to Alfred Barr for the Museum of Modern Art in New York. Bacon wrote to Sutherland asking that he apply fixative to the patches of pastel on Painting 1946 before it was shipped to New York. Painting 1946 is now too fragile to be moved from the museum for exhibition elsewhere.

Bacon later depicted a cow carcass in Figure with Meat (1954).

== Inspiration ==
In 2007, artist Damien Hirst, a fan of Bacon's, modeled his vitrine installation School: The Archaeology of Lost Desires, Comprehending Infinity and the Search for Knowledge after Painting 1946, featuring sides of beef, birds, a chair and an umbrella all within the vitrine.

== See also ==
- List of paintings by Francis Bacon
