= Erica Brausen =

German art dealer (1908–1992)

- Born: 31 January 1908; Düsseldorf, German Empire
- Died: 16 December 1992 (aged 84); London, England
- Known for: Art dealer

Erica Brausen (31 January 1908 – 16 December 1992), was an art dealer and gallerist who established the Hanover Gallery in London in 1948. She was an early champion of several influential contemporary artists, most notably Francis Bacon.

== Biography ==
Brausen was born in Düsseldorf to a father who was a merchant and the master of the local fox-hounds. Brausen left Germany in the early 1930s for Paris where she rented a room in Montparnasse. There she became friends with many of the artists living in the area including Joan Miró and Alberto Giacometti. In 1935 Brausen moved to Majorca, where she ran a bar popular with artists, writers and visiting sailors. She used these contacts to assist Jewish and socialist friends in escaping from Franco's forces during the Spanish Civil War. She persuaded a US Navy submarine captain to take Michel Leiris and his family to safety in Marseille. Brausen herself escaped on a fishing boat and arrived, penniless, in England at the start of World War II.

In London, Brausen began organising small art exhibitions, often in artist studios, but as a German national she encountered many difficulties and restrictions. A gay artist friend married her which allowed her to work legally and she, later, obtained a job at The Redfern Gallery. In 1948, with the financial support of Arthur Jeffress, a collector she had met at a party, Brausen opened the Hanover Gallery in St. George Street off Hanover Square in central London with a solo exhibition of works by Graham Sutherland. From 1946 until its closure in 1973, the Hanover Gallery was among the most influential galleries in Europe. The partnership with Jeffress broke up around the end of 1953, and he left to found his own gallery. A new sponsor, Michael Behrens, stepped in shortly afterwards to support the Hanover.

Brausen had bought a number of Francis Bacon early works, including Painting (1946), and he held his first one-man show at the Hanover in November 1947. Brausen became Alberto Giacometti's principal dealer in London, selling more than seventy of his works over the lifetime of the Gallery. Exhibitions at the Hanover included works by Lucian Freud, Marcel Duchamp and Max Ernst. Works by Henry Moore regularly featured in the Hanovers' annual sculpture shows.

Brausen was a lesbian and for most of her life her partner was Catharina Koopman, known as 'Toto', a one-time Chanel model and film actress. The two met in 1945 in Ascona, Switzerland, where Koopman was recuperating after surviving seven months in the Ravensbrück concentration camp. Koopman had been sent there after she was caught spying for the Italian Resistance during the Second World War. She had been caught on two previous occasions and escaped both times but she was captured a third time in October 1944 in Venice and quickly deported to the camp. Koopman helped Brausen run the Hanover and the two women lived, openly, together until Koopman's death in 1991.
