= Hanover Gallery =

London art gallery

Coordinates: 51.5121°N 0.1428°W

The Hanover Gallery was an art gallery in London. It was opened in June 1948 by the German art expert Erica Brausen and financier and art collector Arthur Jeffress at 32A St. George's Street, W1, and closed on 31 March 1973. It was named after nearby Hanover Square. The Hanover Gallery was an important centre for modern art.

== History ==
Erica Brausen arrived in London before the Second World War and worked at the Redfern Gallery in the West End of London. She ran the Hanover Gallery, together with her partner Toto Koopman, from 1948 onward. One of the exhibitions in 1949 was of work by the then-little known British painter Francis Bacon, his first solo exhibition. Bacon's close relationship with Brausen and the gallery ended by 1958, when he defected to Marlborough Fine Art.

In 1953, Brausen and Jeffress decided to part ways. The financier Michael Behrens was visiting the gallery one evening when Brausen mentioned in passing that she would be closing up the next day, so Behrens bought it from Jeffress.

The French historian Jean-Yves Mock joined the staff in 1956. Mock still holds a large collection of photographs from that time.

Among the artists who exhibited at the gallery, some for the first time ever, were Marcel Duchamp, Max Ernst, Alberto Giacometti, Henri Matisse, Joan Miró, Henry Moore, Man Ray and William Scott.

Brausen closed the gallery in 1973, and continued to work through the Gimpel und Hanover Galerie in Zürich until it too closed in 1984.
