= Francis Bacon (artist) =

Irish-born British figurative painter (1909–1992)

- Bacon in the early 1950s
- Born: 28 October 1909; Dublin, Ireland
- Died: 28 April 1992 (aged 82); Madrid, Spain
- Occupation: Painter
- Works: List

Francis Bacon (28 October 1909 – 28 April 1992) was an Irish-born British figurative painter known for his raw, unsettling imagery. Focusing on the human form, his subjects included crucifixions, portraits of popes, self-portraits, and portraits of close friends, with abstracted figures sometimes isolated in geometrical structures.

He said that he saw images "in series", and his work, which numbers in the region of 590 extant paintings along with many others he destroyed, typically focused on a single subject for sustained periods, often in triptych or diptych formats. His output can be broadly described as sequences or variations on single motifs; including the 1930s Picasso-influenced bio-morphs and Furies, the 1940s male heads isolated in rooms or geometric structures, the 1950s "screaming popes", the mid-to-late-1950s animals and lone figures, the early-1960s crucifixions, the mid-to-late-1960s portraits of friends, the 1970s self-portraits, and the cooler, more technical 1980s paintings.

Bacon did not begin to seriously focus on painting until his late twenties, having drifted in the late 1920s and early 1930s as an interior decorator, bon vivant and gambler. He said that his artistic career was delayed because he spent too long looking for subject matter that could sustain his interest. His breakthrough came with the 1944 triptych Three Studies for Figures at the Base of a Crucifixion, which sealed his reputation as a uniquely bleak chronicler of the human condition. From the mid-1960s, he mainly produced portraits of friends and drinking companions, either as single, diptych or triptych panels. Following the suicide of his lover George Dyer in 1971 (memorialised in his Black Triptychs, and a number of posthumous portraits), his art became more sombre, inward-looking and preoccupied with the passage of time and death. The climax of his later period is marked by the masterpieces Study for Self-Portrait (1982) and Study for a Self-Portrait—Triptych, 1985–86.

Despite his existentialist and bleak outlook, Bacon was charismatic, articulate and well read. A bon vivant, he spent his middle age eating, drinking and gambling in London's Soho with like-minded friends including Lucian Freud (although they fell out in the mid-1970s, for reasons neither ever explained), John Deakin, Muriel Belcher, Henrietta Moraes, Daniel Farson, Tom Baker and Jeffrey Bernard. After Dyer's suicide, he largely distanced himself from this circle, and while still socially active and his passion for gambling and drinking continued, he settled into a platonic and somewhat fatherly relationship with his eventual heir, John Edwards. Since his death, Bacon's reputation has grown steadily, and his work is among the most acclaimed, expensive and sought-after on the art market. In the late 1990s, a number of major works, previously assumed destroyed, including early 1950s pope paintings and 1960s portraits, re-emerged to set record prices at auction.

== Biography ==
=== Early life ===
Francis Bacon was born on 28 October 1909 in 63 Lower Baggot Street in Dublin. At that time, all of Ireland was part of the United Kingdom of Great Britain and Ireland. His father, Army Captain Anthony Edward "Eddy" Mortimer Bacon, was born in Adelaide, South Australia, to an English father and an Australian mother. Eddy was a veteran of the Second Boer War, a racehorse trainer, and the grandson of Major-General Anthony Bacon, who claimed descent from Sir Nicholas Bacon, elder half-brother of Francis Bacon, 1st Viscount St Albans, who is better known as Sir Francis Bacon, the Elizabethan statesman, philosopher, and essayist. Bacon's mother, Christina Winifred "Winnie" Firth, was heiress to a Sheffield steel business and coal mine. He had an older brother, Harley, two younger sisters, Ianthe and Winifred, and a younger brother, Edward.

Bacon was raised by the family nanny, Jessie Lightfoot, from Cornwall, known as "Nanny Lightfoot", a maternal figure who remained close to him until her death. During the early 1940s, he rented the ground floor of 7 Cromwell Place, South Kensington, John Everett Millais's old studio. Lightfoot helped him install an illicit roulette wheel there, organised by Bacon and his friends. It is believed by art critics that Bacon's interest in a working-class perspective developed due to his relationship with Nanny Lightfoot.

The family moved between Ireland and England several times, leading to a sense of displacement which remained with Bacon throughout his life. They lived in Cannycourt House in County Kildare from 1911, later moving to Westbourne Terrace in London, close to where Bacon's father worked at the Territorial Force Records Office. They returned to Ireland after the First World War. Bacon lived with his maternal grandmother and step-grandfather, Winifred and Kerry Supple, at Farmleigh, Abbeyleix, County Laois, although the rest of the family again moved to Straffan Lodge near Naas, County Kildare.

Bacon was a shy child and enjoyed dressing up. This, and his effeminate manner, angered his father. A story emerged in 1992 of his father having had Bacon horsewhipped by their grooms. He was often ill as a child, suffering from asthma and an allergy to horses. His poor health meant his formal education was sporadic; he received lessons at home from a private tutor, and from 1924 to 1926 attended Dean Close, a boarding school in Cheltenham. At a fancy-dress party at the family home, Bacon dressed as a flapper with an Eton crop, beaded dress, lipstick, high heels, and a long cigarette holder. Later that year, Bacon was thrown out of Straffan Lodge following an incident in which his father found him admiring himself in front of a large mirror wearing his mother's underwear.

=== London, Berlin and Paris ===
Bacon spent the latter half of 1926 in London, on an allowance of £3 a week from his mother's trust fund, reading Friedrich Nietzsche. He found that by avoiding rent and engaging in petty theft, he could survive. To supplement his income, he briefly tried his hand at domestic service, but although he enjoyed cooking, he became bored and resigned. He was sacked from a telephone-answering position at a shop selling women's clothes in Poland Street in Soho after writing a poison pen letter to the owner.

Bacon found himself drifting through London's homosexual underworld, aware that he was able to attract a certain type of rich man, something he was quick to take advantage of, having developed a taste for good food and wine. One was a relative of Winnie Harcourt-Smith, another breeder of racehorses, who was renowned for his manliness. Bacon claimed his father had asked this "uncle" to take him 'in-hand' and 'make a man of him'. Bacon had a difficult relationship with his father, once admitting to being sexually attracted to him. He moved to Berlin in 1927, where he saw Fritz Lang's Metropolis and Sergei Eisenstein's Battleship Potemkin, both later to be influences on his work. He spent two months in Berlin, though Harcourt-Smith left after one: "He soon got tired of me, of course, and went off with a woman ... I didn't really know what to do, so I hung on for a while."

Bacon, then 17, spent the next year and a half in Paris. He met Yvonne Bocquentin, pianist and connoisseur, at the opening of an exhibition. Aware of his own need to learn French, Bacon lived for three months with Madame Bocquentin and her family at their house near Chantilly, Oise. He travelled into Paris to visit the city's art galleries. At the Château de Chantilly (Musée Condé) he saw Nicolas Poussin's Massacre of the Innocents, a painting which he often referred to in his later work.

Bacon moved back to London in the winter of 1928/29 to work as an interior designer. He took a studio at 17 Queensberry Mews West, South Kensington, sharing the upper floor with Eric Allden—his first collector—and his childhood nanny, Jessie Lightfoot. In 1929, he met Eric Hall, his patron and lover in an often torturous and abusive relationship. Bacon left the Queensberry Mews West studio in 1931 and had no settled space for some years. He probably shared a studio with Roy De Maistre circa 1931/32 in Chelsea.

=== Designer of furniture and rugs ===
Crucifixion (1933)

Crucifixion (1933) was his first painting to attract public attention, and was in part based on Pablo Picasso's The Three Dancers of 1925. When not well received, Bacon became disillusioned and abandoned painting for nearly a decade and attempted to destroy or suppress his earlier works. He visited Paris in 1935 where he bought a secondhand book on anatomical diseases of the mouth containing high-quality hand-coloured plates of both open mouths and oral interiors, which haunted and obsessed him for the remainder of his life. These and the scene with the nurse screaming on the Odessa steps from the Battleship Potemkin later became recurrent parts of Bacon's iconography, with the angularity of Eisenstein's images often combined with the thick red palette of his recently purchased medical tome.

In the winter of 1935–36, Roland Penrose and Herbert Read, making a first selection for the International Surrealist Exhibition, visited his studio at 71 Royal Hospital Road, Chelsea, saw "three or four large canvases including one with a grandfather clock", but found his work "insufficiently surreal to be included in the show". Bacon claimed Penrose told him "Mr. Bacon, don't you realise a lot has happened in painting since the Impressionists?" In 1936 or 1937 Bacon moved from 71 Royal Hospital Road to the top floor of 1 Glebe Place, Chelsea, which Eric Hall had rented. Bacon exhibited in a group show in January 1937 at Thomas Agnew and Sons, 43 Old Bond Street, London, titled Young British Painters, which included Graham Sutherland and Roy De Maistre. Eric Hall organised the show. He showed four works: Figures in a Garden (1936); Abstraction; Abstraction from the Human Form (known from magazine photographs); and Seated Figure (also lost). These paintings prefigure Three Studies for Figures at the Base of a Crucifixion (1944) in alternatively representing a tripod structure (Abstraction), bared teeth (Abstraction from the Human Form), and both being biomorphic in form.

On 1 June 1940, Bacon's father died. Bacon was named sole trustee/executor of his father's will, which requested the funeral be as "private and simple as possible". Unfit for active wartime service, Bacon volunteered for civil defence and worked full-time in the Air Raid Precautions (ARP) rescue service; the fine dust of bombed London worsened his asthma and he was discharged. At the height of the Blitz, Eric Hall rented a cottage for Bacon and himself at Bedales Lodge in Steep, near Petersfield, Hampshire. Figure Getting Out of a Car (ca. 1939/1940) was painted here but is known only from an early 1946 photograph taken by Peter Rose Pulham. The photograph was taken shortly before the canvas was painted over by Bacon and retitled Landscape with Car. An ancestor to the biomorphic form of the central panel of Three Studies for Figures at the Base of a Crucifixion (1944), the composition was suggested by a photograph of Hitler getting out of a car at one of the Nuremberg rallies. Bacon claims to have "copied the car and not much else". Bacon and Hall took the ground floor of 7 Cromwell Place, South Kensington, formerly the house and studio of John Everett Millais, in 1943. High-vaulted and north-lit, its roof was recently bombed—Bacon was able to adapt a large old billiard room at the back as his studio. Lightfoot, lacking an alternative location, slept on the kitchen table. They held illicit roulette parties, organised by Bacon with the assistance of Hall.

=== Early success ===
By 1944 Bacon had gained confidence and moved toward developing his unique signature style. His Three Studies for Figures at the Base of a Crucifixion had summarised themes explored in his earlier paintings, including his examination of Picasso's biomorphs, his interpretations of the Crucifixion, and the Greek Furies. It is generally considered his first mature piece; he regarded his works before the triptych as irrelevant. The painting caused a sensation when exhibited in 1945 and established him as a foremost post-war painter. Remarking on the cultural significance of Three Studies, John Russell observed in 1971 that "there was painting in England before the Three Studies, and painting after them, and no one ... can confuse the two."

Painting 1946 was shown in several group shows including in the British section of Exposition internationale d'art moderne (18 November – 28 December 1946) at the Musée National d'Art Moderne, for which Bacon travelled to Paris. Within a fortnight of the sale of Painting (1946) to the Hanover Gallery, Bacon used the proceeds to decamp from London to Monte Carlo. After staying at a succession of hotels and flats, including the Hôtel de Ré, Bacon settled in a large villa, La Frontalière, in the hills above the town. Hall and Lightfoot would come to stay. Bacon spent much of the next few years in Monte Carlo apart from short visits to London. From Monte Carlo, Bacon wrote to Sutherland and Erica Brausen. His letters to Brausen show he painted there, but no paintings are known to survive. Bacon said he became "obsessed" with the Casino de Monte Carlo, where he would "spend whole days". Falling in debt from gambling, he was unable to afford a new canvas. This compelled him to paint on the raw, unprimed side of his previous work, a practice he kept throughout his life.

In 1948, Painting (1946) sold to Alfred Barr for the Museum of Modern Art (MoMA) in New York for £240. At least one visit to Paris in 1946 brought Bacon into contact with French postwar painting and Left Bank ideas such as Existentialism. He had, by this time, embarked on his lifelong friendship with Isabel Rawsthorne, a painter closely involved with Giacometti and the Left Bank set. They shared many interests, including ethnography and classical literature.

=== Late 1940s ===
In 1947, Sutherland introduced Bacon to Brausen, who represented Bacon for 12 years. Despite this, Bacon did not mount a one-man show in Brausen's Hanover Gallery until 1949. Bacon returned to London and Cromwell Place late in 1948. The following year Bacon exhibited his "Heads" series, most notable for Head VI, Bacon's first surviving engagement with Velázquez's Portrait of Pope Innocent X (three 'popes' were painted in Monte Carlo in 1946 but were destroyed). He kept an extensive inventory of images for source material, but preferred not to confront the major works in person; he viewed Portrait of Innocent X only once, much later in his life.

=== 1950s ===
Three Studies for a Portrait of Henrietta Moraes, 1963

Bacon's main haunt was The Colony Room, a private drinking club at 41 Dean Street in Soho, known as "Muriel's" after Muriel Belcher, its proprietor. Belcher had run the Music-box club in Leicester Square during the war, and secured a 3–11 p.m. drinking licence for the Colony Room bar as a private-members club. Bacon was an early member, joining the day after its opening in 1948. He was 'adopted' by Belcher as a 'daughter', and allowed free drinks and £10 a week to bring in friends and rich patrons. In 1948 he met John Minton, a regular at Muriel's, as were the painters Lucian Freud, Frank Auerbach, Patrick Swift and the Vogue photographer John Deakin.

In 1950, Bacon met the art critic David Sylvester, then best known for his writing on Henry Moore and Alberto Giacometti. Sylvester had admired and written about Bacon since 1948. Bacon's artistic inclinations in the 1950s moved towards his abstracted figures which were typically isolated in geometrical cage-like spaces, and set against flat, nondescript backgrounds. Bacon said that he saw images "in series", and his work typically focused more on a single subject for sustained periods, often in triptych or diptych formats. Although his decisions might have been driven by the fact that in the 1950s he tended to produce group works for specific showings, usually leaving things until the last minute, there is a significant development in his aesthetic choices during this period which influenced his preference for the represented content in his paintings. On 30 April 1951, Jessie Lightfoot, his childhood nanny, died at Cromwell Place; Bacon was gambling in Nice when he learned of her death. She had been his closest companion, joining him in London on his return from Paris, and lived with him and Eric Alden at Queensberry Mews West, and later with Eric Hall near Petersfield, in Monte Carlo and at Cromwell Place. Stricken, Bacon sold the 7 Cromwell Place apartment.

In 1952, Bacon met Peter Lacy, a pianist and former RAF pilot from a similar social background to himself. Lacy was a violent alcoholic who was disliked by Bacon's contemporaries but was also described as the love of Bacon's life. The pair engaged in an off and on relationship which had a significant sadomasochistic aspect, where Bacon would deliberately provoke acts of violence from Lacy. In the mid-1950s Lacy moved to Tangier, Morocco and Bacon also began to spend some of his time there.

In 1958 he aligned with the Marlborough Fine Art gallery, who remained as his sole dealer until 1992. In return for a ten-year contract, Marlborough advanced him money against current and future paintings, with the price of each determined by its size. A painting measuring 20 inches by 24 inches was valued at £165 ($462), while one of 65 inches by 78 inches was valued at £420 ($1,176); these were sizes Bacon favoured. According to the contract, the painter would try to supply the gallery with £3,500 ($9,800) worth of pictures each year.

=== 1960s and 1970s ===
In 1962, Bacon's lover Peter Lacy died from the effects of alcoholism the day before Bacon opened a retrospective exhibition in the Tate. Bacon met George Dyer in 1963 at a pub, although a much-repeated myth claims they met when Dyer burgled Bacon's flat. Dyer was about 30 years old, from London's East End. He came from a family steeped in crime and had till then spent his life drifting between theft and prison. Bacon's earlier relationships had been with older and tumultuous men. His previous lover, Peter Lacy, had a reputation for tearing up Bacon's paintings, beating him in drunken rages, and at times leaving him on streets half-conscious. Bacon was now the dominating personality, attracted to Dyer's vulnerability and trusting nature. Dyer was impressed by Bacon's self-confidence and success, and Bacon acted as a protector and father figure to the insecure younger man.

Dyer was, like Bacon, a borderline alcoholic and similarly took obsessive care with his appearance. Pale-faced and a chain-smoker, Dyer typically confronted his daily hangovers by drinking again. His compact and athletic build belied a docile and inwardly tortured personality, although the art critic Michael Peppiatt describes him as having the air of a man who could "land a decisive punch". Their behaviours eventually overwhelmed their affair, and by 1970 Bacon was merely providing Dyer with enough money to stay more or less permanently drunk.

As Bacon's work moved from the extreme subject matter of his early paintings to portraits of friends in the mid-1960s, Dyer became a dominating presence. Bacon's paintings emphasise Dyer's physicality, yet are uncharacteristically tender. More than any other of Bacon's close friends, Dyer came to feel inseparable from his portraits. The paintings gave him stature, a raison d'etre, and offered meaning to what Bacon described as Dyer's "brief interlude between life and death". Many critics have described Dyer's portraits as favourites, including Michel Leiris and Lawrence Gowing. Yet as Dyer's novelty diminished within Bacon's circle of sophisticated intellectuals, Dyer became increasingly bitter and ill at ease. Although Dyer welcomed the attention the paintings brought him, he did not pretend to understand or even like them. "All that money an' I fink they're reely 'orrible," he observed with choked pride.

Dyer abandoned crime but descended into alcoholism. Bacon's money attracted hangers-on for benders around London's Soho. Withdrawn and reserved when sober, Dyer was highly animated and aggressive when drunk, and often attempted to "pull a Bacon" by buying large rounds and paying for expensive dinners for his wide circle. Dyer's erratic behaviour inevitably wore thin with his cronies, with Bacon, and with Bacon's friends. Most of Bacon's art world associates regarded Dyer as a nuisance—an intrusion into the world of high culture to which their Bacon belonged. Dyer reacted by becoming increasingly needy and dependent. By 1971, he was drinking alone and only in occasional contact with his former lover.

In October 1971, Dyer joined Bacon in Paris for the opening of Bacon's retrospective at the Grand Palais. While Bacon's career was at a peak, he was described at the time as Britain's "greatest living painter", Dyer knew that his own importance to Bacon was in decline. To gain attention, he planted cannabis in his flat and phoned the police, and attempted suicide on a number of occasions. In Paris, Bacon and Dyer initially shared a hotel room, but Bacon left. When he returned on the morning of 24 October, with Terry Danziger-Miles and Valerie Beston, they discovered Dyer's body. They persuaded the hotel manager not to announce the death for two days.

Bacon spent the following day surrounded by people eager to meet him. In mid-evening of the following day, he was "informed" that Dyer had taken an overdose of barbiturates and was dead. Bacon continued with the retrospective and displayed powers of self-control "to which few of us could aspire", according to Russell. Bacon was deeply affected by the loss of Dyer and had recently lost four other friends and his nanny. From this point, death haunted his life and work. Though outwardly stoic at the time, he was inwardly broken. He did not express his feelings to critics but later admitted to friends that "daemons, disaster and loss" now stalked him as if his own version of the Eumenides (Greek for The Furies). Bacon spent the remainder of his stay in Paris attending to promotional activities and funeral arrangements. He returned to London later that week to comfort Dyer's family.

During the funeral, many of Dyer's friends, including hardened East-End criminals, broke down in tears. As the coffin was lowered into the grave one friend was overcome and screamed "you bloody fool!" Bacon remained stoic during the proceedings, but in the following months suffered an emotional and physical breakdown. Deeply affected, over the following two years he painted a number of single canvas portraits of Dyer, and the three highly regarded "Black Triptychs", each of which details moments immediately before and after Dyer's suicide.

=== Death ===
While on holiday, Bacon was admitted to the private Clinica Ruber in Madrid in 1992. His chronic asthma, which had plagued him all his life, had developed into a more severe respiratory condition and he could not talk or breathe very well.

He died of a heart attack on 28 April 1992, aged 82. He bequeathed his estate (then valued at £11 million) to his heir and sole legatee John Edwards; in 1998, at Edwards's request, Brian Clarke, a friend of Bacon and Edwards, was installed as sole executor of the estate by the High Court, following the Court's severing of all ties between Bacon's former gallery, Marlborough Fine Art, and his estate. In 1998 the director of the Hugh Lane Gallery in Dublin secured Edwards's and Clarke's donation of the contents of Bacon's studio at 7 Reece Mews, South Kensington. The contents of his studio were surveyed, moved, and reconstructed in the gallery.

== Themes ==
=== The Crucifixion ===
The imagery of the crucifixion weighs heavily in the work of Francis Bacon. Critic John Russell wrote that the crucifixion in Bacon's work is a "generic name for an environment in which bodily harm is done to one or more persons and one or more other persons gather to watch". Bacon admitted that he saw the scene as "a magnificent armature on which you can hang all types of feeling and sensation". He believed the imagery of the crucifixion allowed him to examine "certain areas of human behaviour" in a unique way, as the armature of the theme had been accumulated by so many old masters.

Though he came to painting relatively late in life—he did not begin to paint seriously until his late 30s—crucifixion scenes can be found in his earliest works. In 1933, his patron Eric Hall commissioned a series of three paintings based on the subject. The early paintings were influenced by such old masters as Matthias Grünewald, Diego Velázquez and Rembrandt, but also by Picasso's late 1920s/early 1930s biomorphs and the early work of the Surrealists.

=== Popes ===
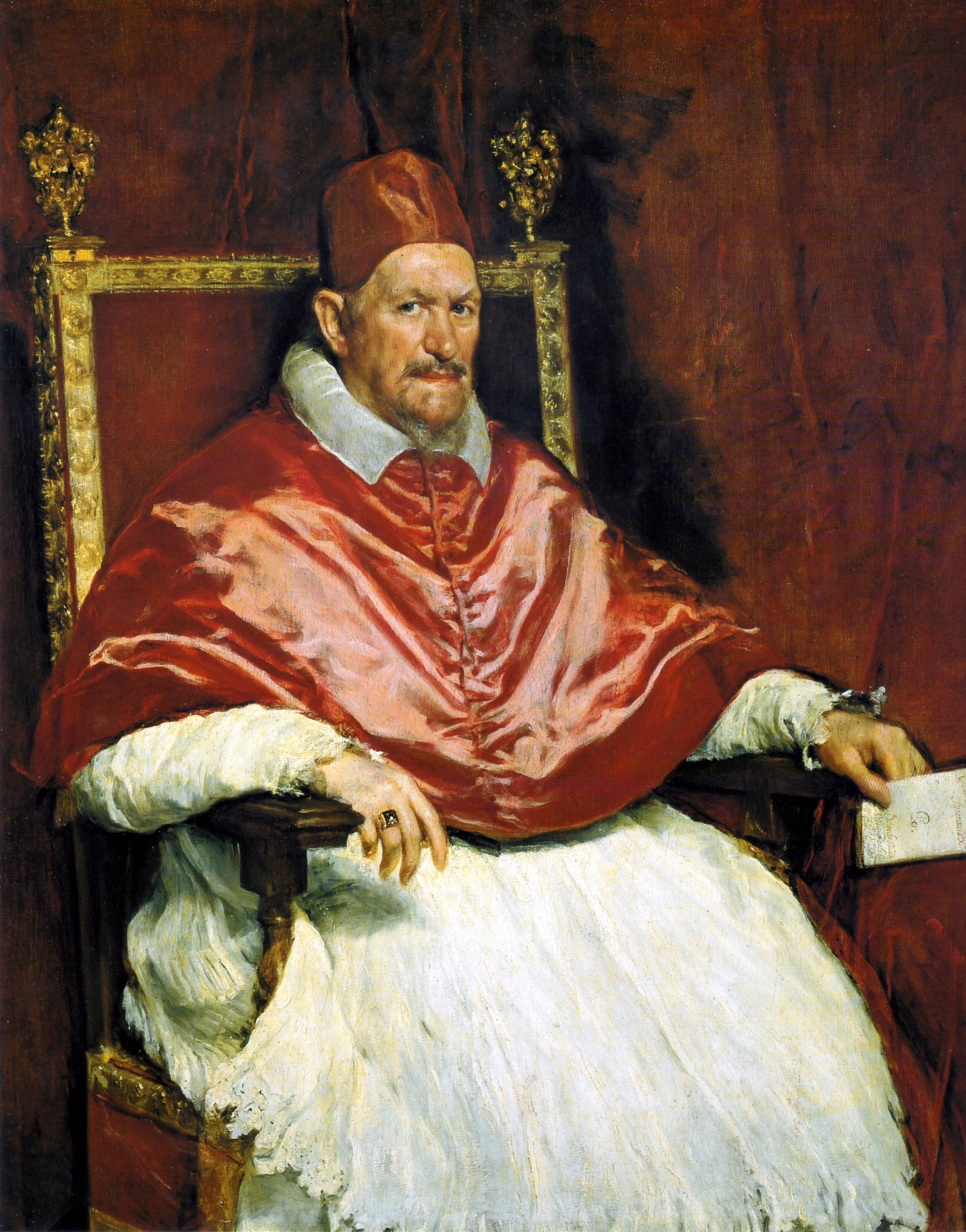
Velázquez's Portrait of Innocent X, 1650. Although Bacon avoided seeing the original, it remained the painting that most affected him, and one to which he referred over and over.

Bacon's series of Popes are largely based on Velázquez's 1650 painting Portrait of Innocent X (Galeria Doria Pamphili, Rome) and papal portraits by Raphael and Titian. His popes seem to strip the figures of their hierarchical power and expose them as alienated figures, seemingly as allegories of human suffering and despair. The Pope series begins with the six paintings known as the "1949 Heads". Each work shows an isolated figure enclosed in a space that is undefined, overwhelmingly claustrophobic, reductive and eerie. Coming early in Bacon's career, they are uneven in quality but show a clear progression. Head I and Head II show formless pieces of flesh that broadly resemble human heads with half-open eyes and a pharynx. The best known of the series is Head VI, where the figure is shown wearing vestments; the first indication in Bacon's work of the influence of Velázquez. In this work, the focus becomes the open mouth and the human scream.

His 1953 Study after Velázquez's Portrait of Pope Innocent X is regarded by art historians as one of Bacon's masterpieces. It has been the subject of detailed analysis by several major scholars. David Sylvester described it as—along with Head VI—"the finest pope Bacon produced".

=== Reclining figures ===
Many of Bacon's paintings are "inhabited" by reclining figures. Single, or, as in triptychs, repeated with variations, they can be commented by symbolic indexes (like circular arrows as signs for rotation), turning painted images into blueprints for moving images of the type of contemporary GIFs. The composition of especially the nude figures is influenced by the sculptural work of Michelangelo. The multi-phasing of his rendition of the figures, which often is also applied to the sitters in the portraits, is also a reference to Eadweard Muybridge's chronophotography.

=== The screaming mouth ===
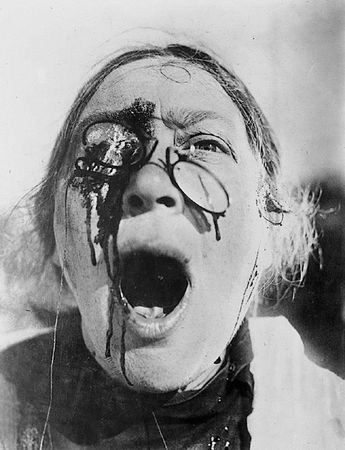
Still from Sergei Eisenstein's 1925 silent film Battleship Potemkin

The inspiration for the recurring motif of screaming mouths in many Bacons of the late 1940s and early 1950s was drawn from a number of sources, including medical textbooks. Kathleen Clark's 1939 book of X-ray photographs was a major source. He also used the works of Matthias Grünewald and photographic stills of the nurse in the Odessa Steps scene in Eisenstein's 1925 silent film Battleship Potemkin. Bacon saw the film in 1935 and viewed it frequently thereafter. He kept in his studio a photographic still of the scene, showing a close-up of the nurse's head screaming in panic and terror and with broken pince-nez spectacles hanging from her blood-stained face. He referred to the image throughout his career, using it as a source of inspiration.

Bacon described the screaming mouth as a catalyst for his work and incorporated its shape when painting the chimera. His use of the motif can be seen in one of his first surviving works, Abstraction from the Human Form. By the early 1950s it became an obsessive concern, to the point, according to art critic and Bacon biographer Michael Peppiatt, "it would be no exaggeration to say that, if one could really explain the origins and implications of this scream, one would be far closer to understanding the whole art of Francis Bacon." Bacon's popes, businessmen and apes dynamically not only scream. They moan, laugh, cry, shout, and yawn as well. Not every painted open mouth is a scream.

=== Bacon's Apes ===
The ape was Bacon's most sustained animal motif. Unlike his dog paintings, which were concentrated in about 1952–1954, Bacon painted apes over roughly three decades, making them both quantitatively and qualitatively his most important animal subject. Owls or elephants are much more rare in Bacon's oeuvre. At the beginning of his exploration of the ape, in the Man/Ape phase, Bacon paints hybrid beings transitioning between human and ape. These intermediate states use painterly means to depict movement and non-simultaneous simultaneity—effects more readily associated with photography and film. Bacon also enters into competition with film by depicting apes and popes dynamically screaming, moaning, laughing, crying, shouting, and yawning. Comparing the ape’s open mouth with that of the popes reveals the ambiguity of the facial expression, often simply described as a scream. In the second, Ape Solo phase, the ape and pope appear separately; the most human-like animal and the closest-to-God human become opposing poles through which Bacon explores human existence and both animal and political-religious power. The ape is portrayed individually, usually as a baboon, gorilla, or chimpanzee. In the third, Co-Ape phase, Bacon focuses on the gaze between figures, animals, and viewers, and on the media filters and barriers that interrupt it. The ape’s gaze at a pope or his portrait exposes structures of power. Unlike earlier traditions, Bacon avoids humorous, moralizing, evolutionary, or imitative readings of the ape. Rather than presenting nature as a utopia, he places apes and ape-human hybrids physically in human environments and psychologically in zones of indistinguishability between humans and animals. His exploration builds on the ape’s physical resemblance to the human figure, his central artistic theme, and expands it through the ape motif.

== Legacy ==
=== Auction value ===
The Popes and large triptychs, in their time, commanded the highest prices at auction. By 1989 Bacon was the most expensive living artist after one of his triptychs sold at Sotheby's for over US$6 million. In 2007, actress Sophia Loren consigned Study for Portrait II (1956) from the estate of her late husband Carlo Ponti at Christie's. It was auctioned for the then record price of £14.2 million ($27.5 million).

In 2008, the Triptych, 1976 sold at Sotheby's for €55.465 million ($86.28 million), then a record for a work by Bacon and the highest price paid for a postwar work of art at auction at the time. In 2013, Three Studies of Lucian Freud sold at Christie's New York for $142.4 million, surpassing both Triptych and 1976 in auctioned value, the record for the highest auction price of a work of art at that time, surpassing the fourth version of Edvard Munch's Scream. Leonardo da Vinci's Salvator Mundi later sold for a higher price.

In 2020, his Triptych Inspired by the Oresteia of Aeschylus (1981) sold for $84.5 million, confirming the enduring high valuation of his large-scale triptychs and intimate portraits, several of which now rank among the most expensive post-war artworks ever sold.

=== Studio relocation ===
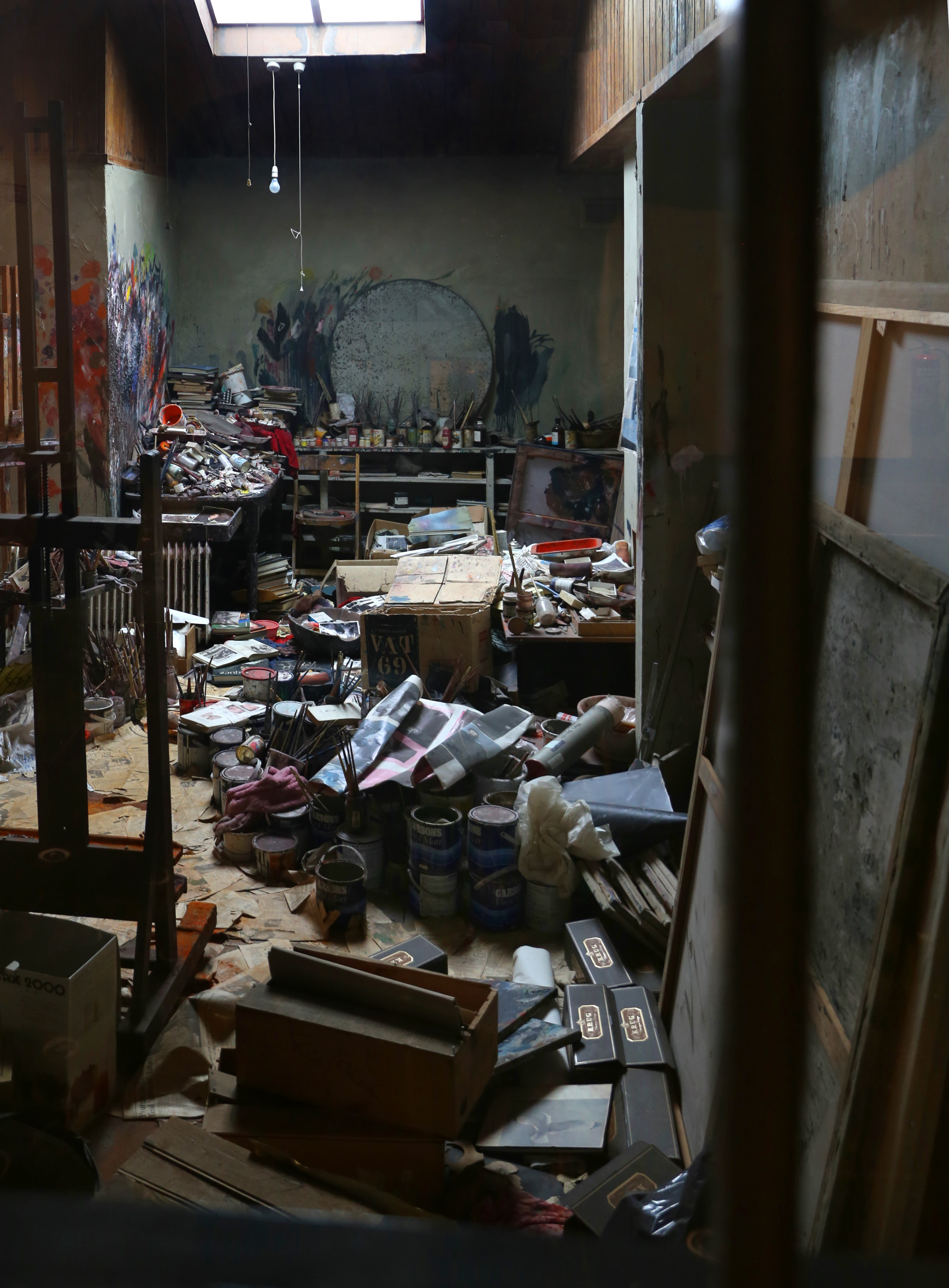
The site of Bacon's relocated studio, Dublin

In August 1998, Bacon's sole heir John Edwards and the artist Brian Clarke, sole executor of Bacon's estate, donated the contents of Bacon's studio to the Hugh Lane Gallery in Dublin. The studio at 7 Reece Mews had remained largely untouched since Bacon's death in 1992. A team of archaeologists, art historians, conservators and curators oversaw the relocation to Dublin. The locations of over 7,000 items were mapped, survey and elevation drawings made, the items packed and catalogued, and the studio was rebuilt, including the original doors, floor, walls and ceiling.

In 2001 the relocated studio was opened to the public, with a fully comprehensive database. Every item in the studio has a database entry. Each entry consists of an image and a factual account of an object. The database has entries on approximately 570 books and catalogues, 1,500 photographs, 100 slashed canvases, 1,300 leaves torn from books, 2,000 artist's materials and 70 drawings. Other categories include Bacon's correspondence, magazines, newspapers and vinyl records.

=== Catalogue raisonné ===
The first, but even then incomplete catalogue raisonné was compiled in 1964 by the Tate gallery curator Ronald Alley. In 2016, a five-volume Francis Bacon: Catalogue Raisonné, documenting 584 paintings, was compiled and published by Martin Harrison and others.

== See also ==
- List of paintings by Francis Bacon
- Love Is the Devil: Study for a Portrait of Francis Bacon, a 1998 fictional biographical film of Bacon, that concentrates on his strained relationship with George Dyer

== Sources and further reading ==
- Archimbaud, Michel (1993) [1992]. Francis Bacon: In Conversation with Michel Archimbaud. London: Phaidon. ISBN 978-0-7148-2983-8 – via Internet Archive.
- Baldassari, Anne (2005). Bacon-Picasso: The Life of Images. Translated by Radzinowicz, David. Paris: Flammarion. ISBN 978-2-08-030486-5.
- Brighton, Andrew (2013) [2001]. Francis Bacon. British Artists. London: Tate Publishing. ISBN 978-1-85437-307-6.
- Cappock, Margarita (2005). Francis Bacon's Studio. Merrell. ISBN 978-1-85894-276-6 – via Internet Archive.
- Deleuze, Gilles (2003) [1981]. Francis Bacon: The Logic of Sensation. Translated by Smith, Daniel W. University of Minnesota Press. ISBN 978-0-8264-7318-9.
- Domino, Christophe (1997). Francis Bacon: Taking Reality by Surprise. New Horizons. Translated by Sharman, Ruth. London: Thames & Hudson. ISBN 978-0-500-30076-3 – via Internet Archive.
- Edwards, John; Ogden, Perry (2001). 7 Reece Mews: Francis Bacon's Studio. London: Thames & Hudson. ISBN 978-0-500-51034-6.
- Farson, Daniel (1994). The Gilded Gutter Life of Francis Bacon. London: Vintage. ISBN 978-0-09-930781-5 – via Internet Archive.
- Gale, Matthew (1999). Francis Bacon: Working on Paper. London: Tate Publishing. ISBN 978-1-85437-280-2.
- Hammer, Martin (2005). Bacon and Sutherland. Yale University Press. ISBN 978-0-300-10796-8 – via Internet Archive.
- Hammer, Martin (2006). Francis Bacon: Portraits and Heads. Edinburgh: National Galleries of Scotland. ISBN 978-1-903278-66-6.
- Harrison, Martin (2005). In Camera: Francis Bacon, Photography, Film and the Practice of Painting. London: Thames & Hudson. ISBN 978-0-500-23820-2.
- Harrison, Martin; Daniels, Rebecca (2008). Francis Bacon: Incunabula. London: Thames & Hudson. ISBN 978-0-500-09344-3.
- Kundera, Milan; Borel, France (1996). Bacon: Portraits and Self-portraits. Translated by Taylor, Ruth; Asher, Linda. London & New York: Thames & Hudson. ISBN 978-0-500-09266-8.
- Peppiatt, Michael (1996). Francis Bacon: Anatomy of an Enigma. London: Weidenfeld & Nicolson. ISBN 978-0-297-81616-4.
- Rothenstein, John (intro); Alley, Ronald. Catalogue raisonnè and documentation, 1964. Francis Bacon. Thames and Hudson
- Rump, Gerhard Charles. "Francis Bacon's Menschenbild". In Gerhard Charles Rump: Kunstpsychologie, Kunst und Psychoanalyse, Kunstwissenschaft. (1981), pp. 146–168. ISBN 978-3-487-07126-8
- Russell, John. Francis Bacon. London: Thames and Hudson, 1993. ISBN 978-0-500-20271-5
- Sabatier, Bruno. "The Complete Graphic Work, Catalogue Raisonné", Paris: JSC Gallery, 2012.
- Schmied, Wieland. Francis Bacon: Commitment and Conflict. London: Prestel Verlag, 2006. ISBN 978-3-7913-3472-1
- Sinclair, Andrew Francis. Bacon: His Life and Violent Times. London: Sinclair Stevenson, 1993; New York: Crown
- Smee, Sebastian (2016). The Art of Rivalry: Four Friendships, Betrayals, and Breakthroughs in Modern Art. Random House. ISBN 978-0-8129-9480-3. "Freud and Bacon", pp. 3-90.
- Steffen, Barbara; Bryson, Norman. Francis Bacon and the Tradition of Art. Zurich: Skira Editore, 2004. ISBN 978-88-8491-721-8
- Stevens, Mark; Swan, Annalyn. Francis Bacon: Revelations. Knopf, 2021. ISBN 978-0-307-27162-4
- Sylvester, David. Interviews with Francis Bacon. London: Thames & Hudson, 1987. ISBN 978-0-500-27475-0
- Sylvester, David. Looking Back at Francis Bacon. London: Thames & Hudson, 2000. ISBN 978-0-500-01994-8
- Sylvester, David. Francis Bacon: The Human Body. London: Hayward Gallery, 1998. ISBN 978-1-85332-175-7
- Sylvester, David; Hunter, Sam; Peppiat, Michael (1998). Francis Bacon: Important Paintings from the Estate. New York: Tony Shafrazi Gallery. ISBN 978-1-891475-16-0.
- Sylvester, David. About Modern Art: Critical Essays 1948–2000. London: Pimlico, 2002. ISBN 978-0-7126-0563-2
- Todoli, Vincente. Francis Bacon: Caged. Uncaged. Lisbon: Fundacao De Serralves, 2003. ISBN 978-972-739-109-7
- Van Alphen, Ernst. Francis Bacon and the Loss of Self. London: Reaktion Books, 1992. ISBN 978-0-948462-34-4
- Zweite, Armin. Francis Bacon: The Violence of the Real. London: Thames and Hudson, 2006. ISBN 978-0-500-09335-1
