= Portrait of Innocent X =

Oil painting by Spanish painter Diego Velázquez

- Retrato de Inocencio X (Spanish)
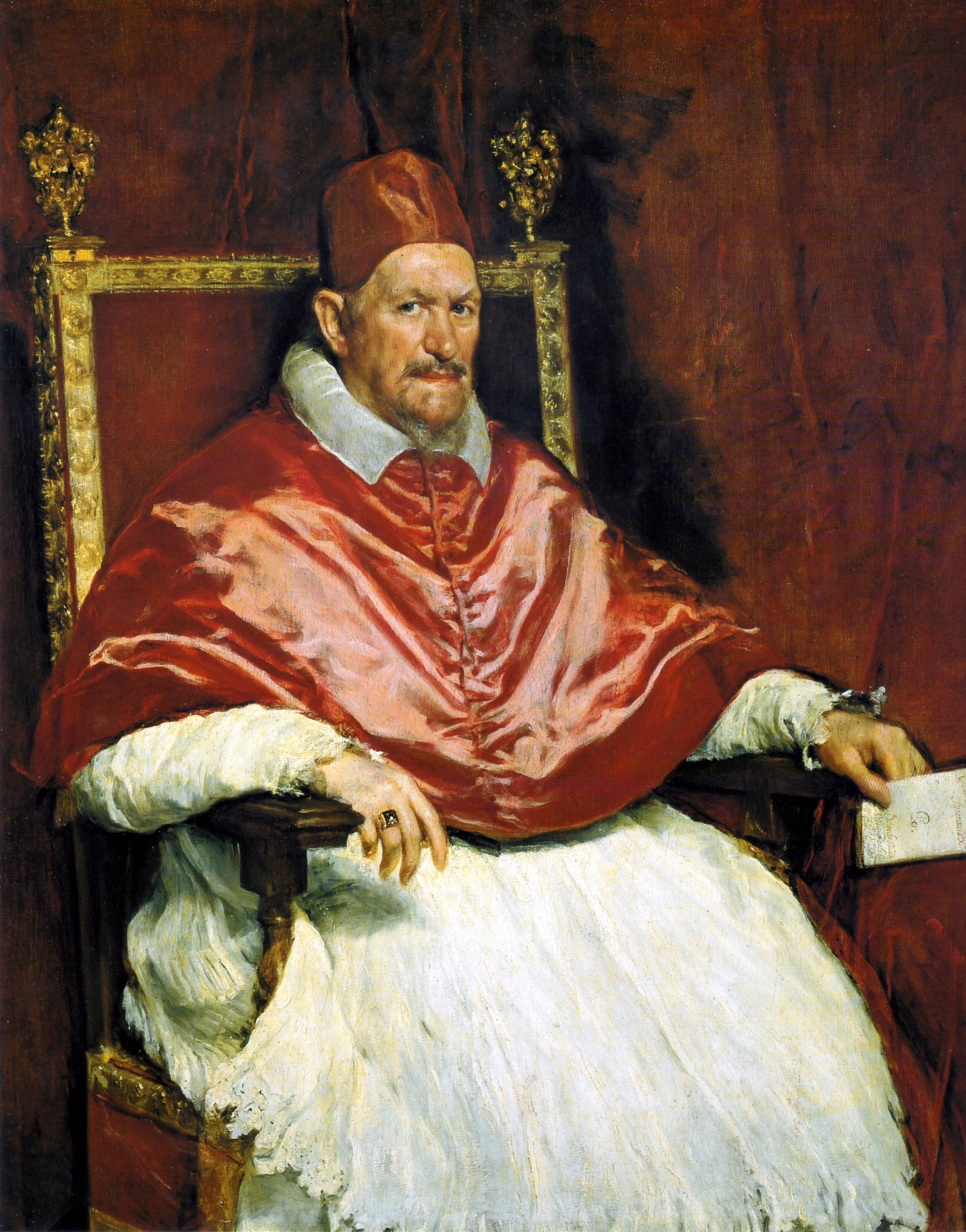
- Artist: Diego Velázquez
- Year: c. 1650
- Medium: Oil on canvas
- Subject: Pope Innocent X
- Dimensions: 141 cm × 119 cm (56 in × 47 in)
- Location: Galleria Doria Pamphilj, Rome

Portrait of Innocent X is a c. 1650 oil on canvas painting by Spanish artist Diego Velázquez, depicting Pope Innocent X, head of the Catholic Church from 1644 to 1655. Many artists and art critics consider it the finest portrait ever created. It is housed in the Galleria Doria Pamphilj in Rome. A study is on display at Apsley House in London.

The painting is noted for its realism as an unflinching portrait of a highly intelligent, shrewd, and aging man. He is dressed in linen vestments, and the quality of the work is evident in the rich reds of his upper clothing, head-dress, and the hanging curtains.

The painting was created during a trip by Velázquez to Italy. The Pope, born Giovanni Battista Pamphilj, was initially wary of sitting for Velázquez, but relented after he was shown reproductions of portraits by the artist. A contributing factor for this large advancement in the painter's career was that he had already depicted a number of members of Pamphilj's inner court. The Pope, however, remained cautious, and the painting was initially displayed only to his immediate family, and was largely lost from public view through the 17th and 18th centuries.

Irish-British artist Francis Bacon notably used Velázquez's portrait as a reference for dozens of paintings from 1949 to 1971. In most of them, the Pope is screaming or has a distorted appearance. These works most famously include Head VI (1949) and Study after Velázquez's Portrait of Pope Innocent X (1953).

== History ==
The portrait was painted during Velázquez's second voyage to Italy, between 1649 and 1651. The subject's vestments are of light linen, suggesting that the picture was probably painted during summer, most likely in 1650. Velázquez included his signature on the paper in the Pope's hands, but the date is not readable. There are two versions of the story of how Velázquez came to paint the portrait. According to one of these, while visiting Rome, Velázquez, already a renowned painter, was granted an audience with Pope Innocent X. He offered to paint a portrait of the Pope, but Innocent X mistrusted Velázquez's fame, and asked for proof of Veláquez's skills. It would have been then that Velázquez painted the portrait of his servant Juan de Pareja. Once Innocent saw that portrait, he agreed to sit for the artist.

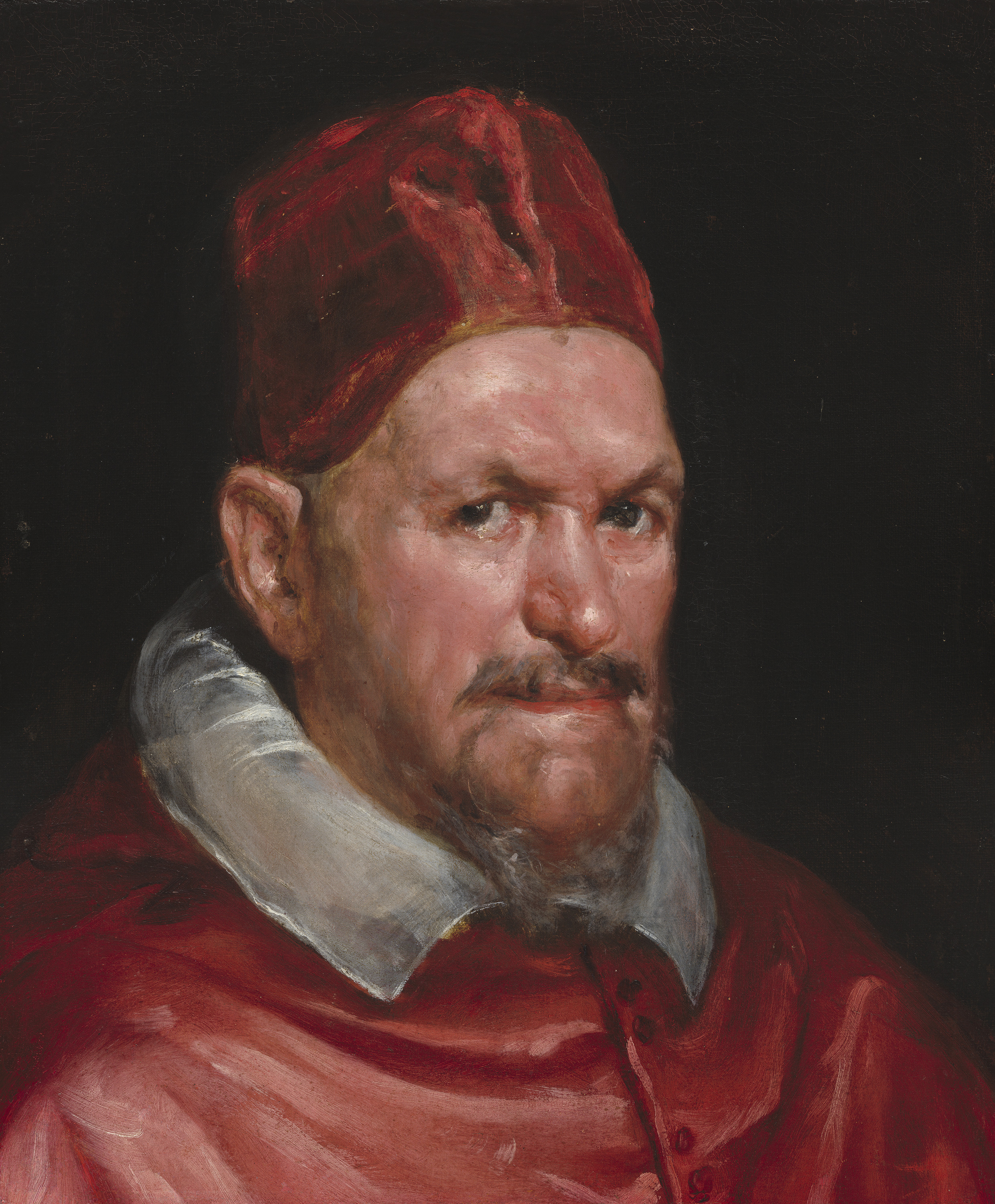
A copy made by Velázquez's circle, currently hanging at the National Gallery of Art, Washington

Apparently, when the Pope saw the finished portrait, he exclaimed: "È troppo vero! È troppo vero!" ("It's too true! It's too true!"), though he did not deny the extraordinary quality of the portrait. Experts doubt the veracity of this story, and argue that the Pope allowed Velázquez to paint him because he had already painted with great success other people from the inner papal court, including the Pope's barber.

The portrait was kept at private display by Innocent's family, the Pamphilj, who would display it in the Doria Pamphilj Gallery where it remains to this day. For much of the 17th and 18th centuries, it was a relatively unknown work, familiar only to a few connoisseurs who regarded it to be one of the finest portraits ever. French historian Hippolyte Taine considered the portrait as "the masterpiece amongst all portraits" and said "once it has been seen, it is impossible to forget".

The art dealer René Gimpel noted in his diary in 1923 "Morgan would have offered a million dollars for it. Velázquez was faced with a ruddy Italian, and the artist, accustomed to the pale complexions of his country, unhesitatingly steeped his brush in red the color of wine and brought the bon vivant devastatingly to life.... That face is a whirlpool of flesh, and blood, and life; the eyes are searching."

== Influence ==
The 20th century artist Francis Bacon painted a series of distorted variants, often known as the "Screaming Popes", which total more than forty-five known variants executed during the 1950s and early 1960s. The picture was described by Gilles Deleuze as an example of creative re-interpretation of the classical. Bacon avoided seeing the original, but the painting remained the single greatest influence on him; its presence can be seen in many of his best works from the late 1940s to the early 1960s. In Bacon's 1953 version Study after Velázquez's Portrait of Pope Innocent X (1953), the Pope is shown screaming yet his voice is "silenced" by the enclosing drapes and dark rich colors which have been said to create a grotesque and nightmarish tone. The pleated curtains of the backdrop are rendered transparent and appear to fall through the representation of the Pope's face.

At least a dozen works by Peruvian painter Herman Braun-Vega refer to the Portrait of Innocent X. These appropriations are generally a way of casting a critical eye on spiritual leaders and Churches. Among the most important of these works are Hello Mister Bacon (1981), which puts into abyme Bacon's Study after Velázquez's Portrait of Pope Innocent X, I love the neutron bomb (1982), La laïque (1984), the right panel of the triptych Dar al Cesar (1992), Let the little children come to me (2003), El poder se nutre de dogmas (2006), L'argent des Andes (2010).

A reversed form of the portrait features on the cover of occult rock band Ghost's 2018 album Prequelle.

== See also ==
- List of works by Diego Velázquez

== Sources ==
- Peppiatt, Michael. Anatomy of an Enigma. Westview Press, 1996. ISBN 0-8133-3520-5
- Schmied, Wieland. Francis Bacon: Commitment and Conflict. Munich: Prestel, 1996. ISBN 3-7913-1664-8
