= Dyer (surname) =

Dyer (/ˈdaɪ.ər/) is an English surname with early medieval origins, deriving from the trade of cloth dying. Dyer is also found in Ireland (Counties Sligo and Roscommon) as an Anglicisation of the Irish Gaelic surnames in Ireland "O Duibhir" and "Mac Duibhir" (O'Dyer / McDyer). These are both derived from the words dubh, which means black, and odhar or uidhir, which mean uncolored.

Notable people with the surname include:

- Ainsworth Dyer (1988-2002), one of the victims of the Tarnak Farm incident
- Alex Dyer (footballer born 1965), English footballer
- Alex Dyer (footballer born 1990), English footballer
- Alexander Brydie Dyer (1815–1874), American soldier in a variety of 19th century wars
- Sir Alfred Dyer (1865–1947), British newspaper editor, politician, and company director
- Alvin R. Dyer (1903–1977), an apostle in the Church of Jesus Christ of Latter-day Saints
- Amelia Dyer (1837–1896), Victorian nurse and baby farmer hanged for murder
- Anne Dyer (born 1957), British Anglican priest and former Warden of Cranmer Hall, Durham
- Bert Dyer (1886–19??), English footballer
- Bruce Dyer (born 1975), English footballer
- Buddy Dyer (born 1958), American politician, mayor of Orlando
- Charles Dyer (disambiguation), several people, including:
  - Charles Dyer (architect) (1794–1848), British architect
  - Charles E. Dyer (1834–1905), American federal judge
  - Charles V. Dyer (1808–1878), American abolitionist
  - Charles Dyer (playwright) (1928–2021), English playwright, actor and screenwriter
  - Charles A. Dyer, American child rapist and former Marine sergeant
- Clay Dyer (born 1978), American professional sport bass fisherman
- Clint Dyer (born 1968), English actor, director, and playwright
- Danny Dyer (born 1977), English television, film and theatre actor
- Dani Dyer (born 1996), English television personality, winner of Love Island 2018, daughter of Danny
- Deborah Dyer (born 1967), known by the stage name Skin, English singer, an electronic music DJ, and an occasional model
- Dennis Dyer (1914–1990), South African cricketer
- Eddie Dyer (1899–1964), American baseball player
- Sir Edward Dyer (1543–1607), English courtier and poet
- Elinor Brent-Dyer (1894–1969), British author
- Eliphalet Dyer (1721–1807), American lawyer, jurist, and statesman
- Fred Dyer (1888–????), British boxer and entertainer
- Frederick H. Dyer, American Civil War author
- Geoff Dyer (born 1958), English writer
- Geoffrey Dyer (1947–2020), Australian artist
- George Dyer (disambiguation), several people, including
  - George Dyer (poet) (1755–1841), English classicist and writer
  - George Dyer (politician) (1802–1878), American physician and politician
  - George P. Dyer (1876–1948), American football coach
  - George Dyer (burglar) (c. 1933–1971), English burglar, lover of artist Francis Bacon
  - George Dyer Weaver (1908–1986), Canadian politician, member of the House of Commons of Canada
  - George Leland Dyer (1849–1914), American naval commander and governor of Guam
- Goudyloch E. Dyer (1919–2008), American politician
- Greg Dyer (born 1959), Australian cricketer
- Gwynne Dyer (born 1943), London-based Canadian journalist and military historian
- Harold J. Dyer (1921–2008), American politician
- Harriet Dyer (born 1988), Australian actress
- Hector Dyer (1910–1990), American athlete and Olympian
- Henry Dyer (1848–1918), Scottish engineer and educator
- Herbert Dyer (1898–1974), English coppersmith
- Isadore Dyer (1865–1920), American physician
- J. Milton Dyer (1870–1957), American architect
- Jack Dyer (1913–2003), nicknamed Captain Blood, Australian rules footballer
- Sir James Dyer (1510 – 24 March 1582), English judge and Speaker of the House of Commons during the reign of Edward VI
- Jane Dyer (born 1949), American author and illustrator
- Jerry Dyer (born 1959), American politician and law enforcement officer
- Jesse Farley Dyer (1877–1955), American Medal of Honor recipient
- John Dyer (disambiguation), several people named John or Johnny Dyer, including:
  - John Dyer (1699–1757), Welsh poet
  - Sir John Dyer, 6th Baronet (1738–1801), English soldier and courtier who was Groom of the Bedchamber to the Prince of Wales.
  - Johnny Dyer (1938–2014), American electric blues harmonicist and singer
- Joyce Dyer (born 1947), American writer of nonfiction and memoirs
- Julia Knowlton Dyer (1829–1927), American philanthropist
- Ken Dyer (1946–2010), American football player
- Kieron Dyer (born 1978), English international football (soccer) player
- Leonidas C. Dyer (1871–1957), American politician, activist and military officer
- Lloyd Dyer (born 1982), English footballer
- Louis Dyer (1851–1908), American educator and author
- Madeleine Dyer, Australian film director of A Savage Christmas (2023)
- Maria (Tarn) Dyer (c. 1803–1846), British Protestant Christian missionary to the Chinese in the Congregationalist tradition
- Mary Dyer (c. 1611–1660), American Quaker martyr
- Mary Marshall Dyer (1780–1867), American anti-Shakerist
- Mike Dyer (disambiguation), several people named Mike or Michael Dyer, including:
  - Mike Dyer (baseball) (born 1966), retired Major League Baseball pitcher
  - Mike Dyer (sportswriter) (born 1939), retired sportswriter
  - Michael Dyer (born 1990), American football running back
- Moses Dyer (born 1997), New Zealand association footballer
- Myles P. Dyer (1887–1969), American politician who served in the Missouri General Assembly
- Natalia Dyer (born 1995), American actress
- Nathan Dyer (born 1987), English footballer
- Nehemiah Dyer (1839–1910), American naval officer
- Nick Dyer (born 1969), Scottish cricketer
- Nina Dyer (1930–1965), Anglo-Indian model and socialite
- Peter Swinnerton-Dyer (1927–2018), British mathematician
- Reginald Dyer (1864–1927), British colonel, responsible for the Amritsar massacre
- Richard Dyer (born 1945), English academic in film studies
- Richard Dyer-Bennet (1913–1991), English-born American folk singer
- Robert Allen Dyer (1900–1987), South African botanist
- Robert Henry Dyer (1774–May 11, 1826), American militia officer
- Rolla Dyer (1886–1971), American physician
- Rona Dyer (1923 - 2021), New Zealand artist
- Royce Coleman Dyer, (1889–1918), Canadian captain who trained "Dyer's Battalion"
- Sarah Dyer, American comic book writer and artist
- Senimili Dyer (died 2013), Fijian politician
- Samuel Dyer (1804–1843), British Protestant Christian missionary to China
- T. F. Thiselton-Dyer (1848–1923), British author
- Thomas Dyer (1805–1862), American politician, served as mayor of Chicago
- Sir Thomas Dyer, 7th Baronet (1768–1838), English soldier and landowner
- Thomas Henry Dyer (1804–1888), English historical and antiquarian writer
- Walter Alden Dyer (1878–1943), American author and journalist
- Wayne Dyer (1940–2015), American author and speaker
- Wayne Dyer (footballer) (born 1977), English footballer
- William Dyer (settler) (1609–by 1677), founding settler of Portsmouth and Newport, Rhode Island; husband of Mary Dyer
- William John Dyer (1830–1909), New Zealand businessman and politician
- William Turner Thiselton-Dyer (1843–1928), British botanist

== See also ==
- Eric Jeremy Edgar Dier (born 1994), English Footballer
- Dyer baronets

== Fictional characters ==
- Milton Dyer (Ninjago), a character in Ninjago
- Emily Dyer, a character in Identity V
- Alice Dyer, a character in the horror podcast The Magnus Protocol
