= George Dyer =

George Dyer may refer to:

- George Dyer (poet) (1755–1841), English classicist and writer
- George Dyer (politician) (1802–1878), American physician and politician
- George P. Dyer (1876–1948), American football coach
- George R. Dyer (1869–1934), American military officer and chairman of the Port Authority of New York
- George Dyer (model) (c. 1933–1971), English burglar, lover and model of artist Francis Bacon
  - Three Studies for George Dyer, painted by Bacon in 1964
  - Portrait of George Dyer Talking, painted by Bacon in 1966
  - Portrait of George Dyer and Lucian Freud, painted by Bacon in 1967
- George Leland Dyer (1849–1914), American naval commander and governor of Guam
- George Dyer (rugby union) (born 1999), New Zealand rugby union player

== See also ==
- George Dyer Weaver (1908–1986), Canadian politician, member of the House of Commons of Canada
