= 1949 in art =

List of years in art	(table)
- … 1939; 1940; 1941; 1942; 1943; 1944; 1945; 1946; 1947; 1948; 1949; 1950; 1951; 1952; 1953; 1954; 1955; 1956; 1957; 1958; 1959 …
- Art; Archaeology; Architecture; Literature; Music; Philosophy; Science; +...

Events from the year 1949 in art.

== Events ==
- Formation of Penwith Society of Arts in St Ives, Cornwall.
- Philadelphia Artists Equity is established in Pennsylvania, United States, to protect artists' rights and improve working and economic conditions for fine artists.
- Young Contemporaries exhibition, initiated by Carel Weight for the British Society of Artists Galleries, establishes the New Contemporaries series.
- David Jones begins a 5-year sequence of watercolours of flowers in glasses.
- Yves Klein paints his first monochromes, while apprenticed to a picture-frame maker in London.

== Awards ==
- Archibald Prize: Arthur Murch – Bonar Dunlop

== Works ==
- Francis Bacon – Head III, Head IV, Head V, Head VI
- Brenda Chamberlain – The Fisherman's Return (National Museum of Wales)
- Salvador Dalí
  - Leda Atomica
  - The Madonna of Port Lligat (original version; Haggerty Museum of Art, Milwaukee, Wisconsin)
- Paul Delvaux – The Temple
- Sir William Reid Dick – Lady Godiva (equestrian bronze, Coventry)
- Sir Russell Drysdale – West Wyalong
- Frida Kahlo
  - Diego and I
  - The Love Embrace of the Universe, the Earth (Mexico), Myself, Diego, and Señor Xolotl
- Tadeusz Kantor – Man with Umbrella
- Wifredo Lam = Femme avec un Oiseau
- L. S. Lowry
  - The Canal Bridge
  - The Football Match
  - The Spire
- Henry Moore – Family Group (first casting)
- Robert Motherwell – Five in the Afternoon
- Barnett Newman – Abraham
- Pablo Picasso – Dove
- William Scott
  - Frying Pan and Eggs
  - Still Life with Candlestick
- Graham Sutherland – Somerset Maugham
- Steffen Thomas – Statue of Eugene Talmadge
- Vladimir Tretchikoff – The Dying Swan
- Boris Vladimirski – Roses for Stalin
- Lucien Wercollier – Le prisonnier politique (bronze)
- Andrzej Wróblewski – Execution V

== Births ==
- February 17 – Peter Kennard, English photomontage artist
- February 18 – Charlie Waite, English landscape photographer
- February 27 – Richard P. Cook, English artist
- March 11 – Griselda Pollock, South African-born feminist visual art historian and theorist
- April 9 – Stephen Hickman, American illustrator, sculptor and author
- May 7 – Deborah Butterfield, American sculptor
- May 12 – Ross Bleckner, American painter
- July 6 – Tibor Kalman, Hungarian-American graphic designer (d. 1999)
- August 12 – Glòria Muñoz, Spanish painter
- August 15 – Richard Deacon, British sculptor
- August 27 – Istvan Kantor, Hungarian-Canadian performance artist
- Jim Dolan, American sculptor
- P. K. Mahanandia, Indian-born portrait artist
- Lincoln Perry -American painter, muralist, and sculptor

== Deaths ==
Death mask of James Ensor

- March 17 – Aleksandra Ekster, painter and designer, Art Deco pioneer (b. 1882)
- May 3 – Mariano Fortuny, fashion designer (b. 1871)
- May 15 – Henri Beau, Canadian Impressionist painter (b. 1863)
- June 21 – Edward Wadsworth, English Vorticist painter (b. 1889)
- August 8 – Joaquín Torres García, Uruguayan painter (b. 1874)
- September 7 - José Clemente Orozco, Mexican painter and illustrator (b. 1883)
- September 25 – Henri Manguin, painter (b. 1874)
- November 3 – Solomon R. Guggenheim, art collector (b. 1861)
- November 19 – James Ensor, painter (b. 1860)
- November 27 – Vincenzo Irolli, Italian painter (b. 1860)
- December 28 – Emília dos Santos Braga, Portuguese painter (b. 1867)
- (Herbert Barnard) John Everett, English marine artist (b. 1877)

== See also ==
- 1949 in Fine Arts of the Soviet Union
