= Thiselton-Dyer =

Thiselton-Dyer may refer to:

- Harriet Anne Thiselton-Dyer (née Hooker, 1854–1945), British botanical illustrator, wife of William Turner Thiselton-Dyer
- T. F. Thiselton-Dyer (1848–1923), British clergyman
- William Turner Thiselton-Dyer (1843–1928), British botanist

== See also ==
- Thiselton (disambiguation)
- Dyer (surname)
