= Firminger =

Firminger may refer to:

- Walter K. Firminger (1870-1940), archdeacon of Calcutta and historian of India.
- John Firminger Duthie (1845–1922), English botanist and explorer.
- Thomas Firminger Thiselton Dyer (1848–1923) English curate and writer.
