= Giovanni Montemartini =

Italian economist and politician

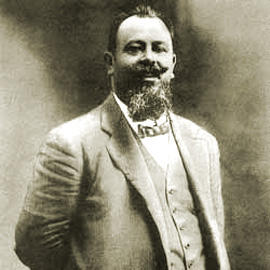
Giovanni Montemartini

Giovanni Montemartini (19 February 1867 – 7 July 1913) was an Italian economist and politician.

== Biography ==
He was born in Montù Beccaria, province of Pavia. He studied law at the University of Pavia, where he was influenced by the economist Luigi Cossa. In 1893, he studied for a year in Vienna under Carl Menger. He returned to Italy, where he obtained a series of teaching positions at technical institutes. In 1901, he was elected to the council of the Società Umanitaria of Milan, which had recently been founded by the philanthropist Prospero Moise Loria, and aimed to alleviate unemployment.

By 1901, he was appointed to a Council of Emigration led by Luigi Bodio. His statistical approach to economic problems led him to an appointment at the newly founded Office of Labor, created in 1902 as part of the Ministry of Agriculture, Industry, and Commerce. Soon he was appointed a newly founded National Institute of Statistics.

He continued to publish in journals such as Giornale degli economisti, for which he was an editor from 1904 to 1910. he also published in Critica Sociale. In 1904 he joined an anti-protectionist league, and the next year, along with David Lubin, Luigi Luzzatti, Antonio De Viti De Marco and Pantaleoni, helped found the Istituto Internazionale di Agricoltura, an organization of small agricultural producers. In 1907, he was elected to the communal council of Rome as a member of the Socialist party. The council was led by Ernesto Nathan. He promulgated plans to municipalize (establish under control of the municipality) utility service such as electrification and tram transport, publishing this a book titled Municipalizzazione dei pubblici servigi (1902). These proposals were approved by the Rome council in 1909. This led to the establishment in 1912 of the Centrale Montemartini in the rione Ostiense, and a hydroelectric station at Castel Madama in 1916. He died unexpectedly after participating a public debate in Rome on the establishment of public transportation. His brother, Gabriele Luigi Montemartini (1869-1952), was a deputy from the Socialist party. A former Roman power station Centrale Montemartini is named after him, and has been presently been converted into an unusual museum, displaying Ancient Roman artifacts formerly in the collections of the Capitoline Museums, alongside the former heavy machinery and consoles of the power station.
