= Thomas Dyer (disambiguation) =

Thomas Dyer (1856–1857) was mayor of Chicago, Illinois.

Thomas Dyer may also refer to:

- Thomas Dyer (MP) for Bridgwater (UK Parliament constituency)
- T. F. Thiselton-Dyer (Thomas Firminger Thiselton-Dyer, 1848–1923), English writer of popular non-fiction books
- Thomas Henry Dyer (1804–1888), English historical and antiquarian writer
