= Head IV =

1949 painting by Francis Bacon

- Artist: Francis Bacon
- Year: 1949
- Medium: Oil on canvas
- Location: Private collection

Head IV, sometimes subtitled Man with a Monkey, is a 1949 painting by Irish-born British artist Francis Bacon, one of series of works made in 1949 for his first one-man exhibition at the Hanover Gallery, in London. It measures 82 by 66 centimetres (32 in × 26 in) and is held in a private collection. It was part of a series of six similar works from the late 1940s. Like Bacon's Head III and Head V, the painting is usually considered as intermediate between his better known Head VI.

The painting was bought in 1949 by Tony Hubbard, heir to the Woolworth fortune. It entered the private collection of the New York broker Geoffrey Gates in 1963. It remains in a private collection.

== Description ==
The painting depicts the upper half of a male figure in a suit, in a rear quarter view facing away from the viewer, in a space shrouded with vertical bands interpreted as curtains. The figure is possibly looking in a mirror, where a simian face looks back. Like Head III, it is painted in dark tones of grey and black on a beige ground with white highlights, which in this case pick out the man's shirt collar, his neck, ear and temple. The placing of the two heads suggests the man is dissolving into the monkey, although the man is sometimes described as having a monkey on his shoulder; the low contrast between the elements have been likened to a cinematic dissolve. It may be based on a photograph.

Bacon's six "Head" paintings were first exhibited at the Hanover Gallery in 1949, alongside four other important early works by Bacon: Three Studies for Figures at the Base of a Crucifixion, Figure in a landscape, Study from the Human Body and Study for Portrait (also known as Man in a Blue Box). Many are now held by major public collections.

== See also ==
- List of paintings by Francis Bacon
