= Study from Innocent X =

1962 painting by Francis Bacon

- Artist: Francis Bacon
- Year: 1962
- Type: Oil on canvas
- Dimensions: 78 cm × 55.75 cm (31 in × 21.95 in)
- Location: Private collection

Study from Innocent X is an oil-on-canvas painting by the Irish-born English artist Francis Bacon, from 1962. It is held in a private collection. Based on Portrait of Innocent X (c. 1650) by Diego Velázquez, the work depicts a distorted image of the red-robed Pope Innocent X, sitting on a dark red chair on a platform inside a cuboid cage indicated by thin black lines, standing on a light brownish yellow floor with a curved lighter red wall behind.

It measures 78 by 55.75 inches (198.1 cm × 141.6 cm).

Bacon later remade Study from Innocent X, as Study of Red Pope 1962. 2nd version 1971.

== See also ==
- List of paintings by Francis Bacon
