= West Wyalong (Drysdale) =

1949 painting by Russell Drysdale

- Artist: Russell Drysdale
- Year: 1949
- Type: oil on composition board
- Dimensions: 81.3 cm × 101.6 cm (32.0 in × 40.0 in)
- Location: Private collection

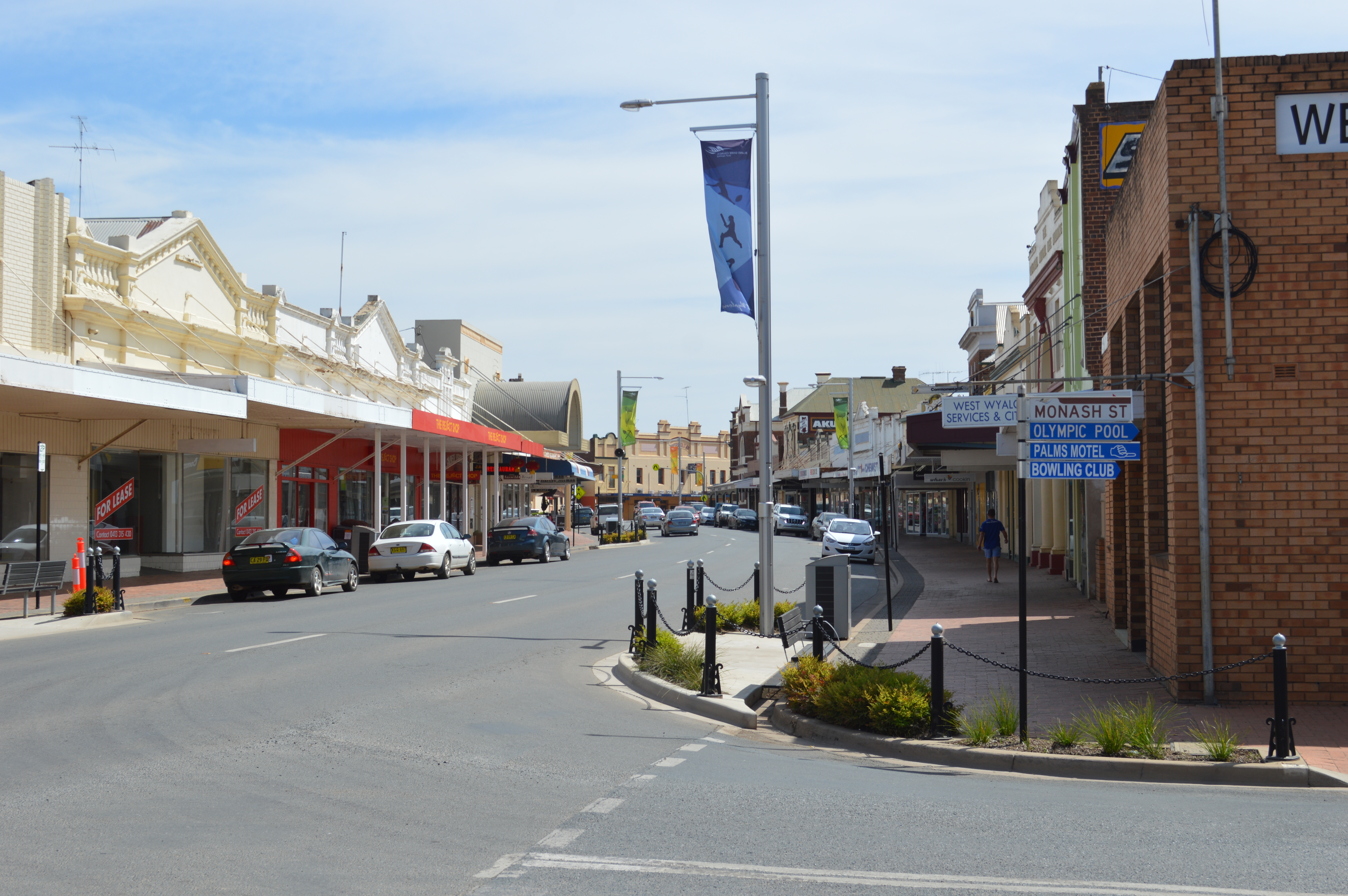
The view from outside the Tattersalls Hotel in West Wyalong in 2015 - where in 1949 Drysdale drew the sketch of Main Street that would later be used to paint the work

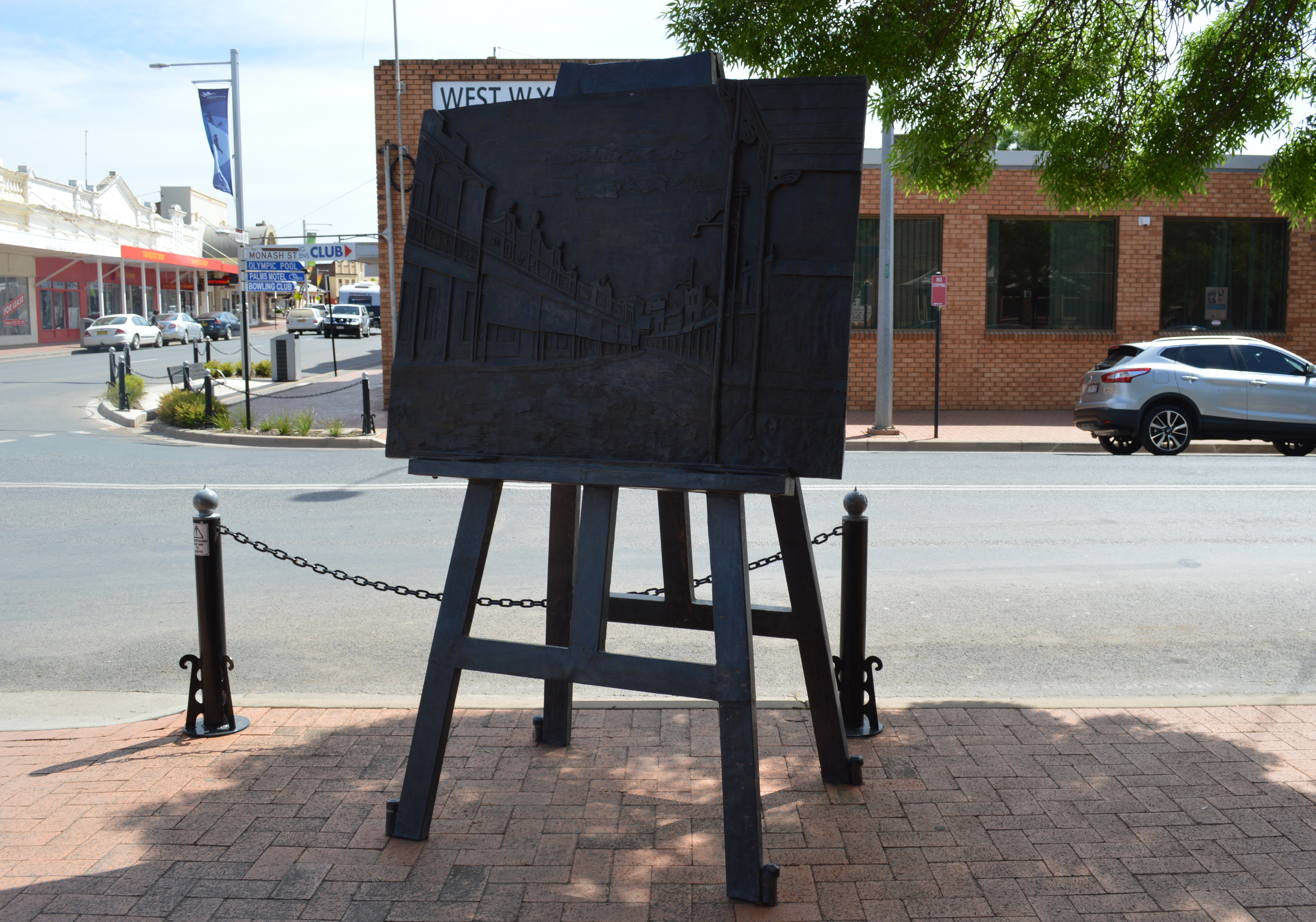
A 2014 Gillie and Marc sculpture commemorating Drysdale and this painting. It stands in front of the Tattersalls Hotel

West Wyalong is a 1949 painting by Australian artist Russell Drysdale. The painting depicts the main street of the New South Wales town of West Wyalong, with its characteristic bend. Curator of the Art Gallery of New South Wales, Barry Pearce, stated that it was one of Australia's ten greatest paintings.

The painting was conceived when Drysdale accompanied his friend—the barrister, and later Justice John Nagel—on a trip to West Wyalong.

I was rather fascinated with the town itself. I mean, I’d known it but I hadn't gone back to it for years, not since I’ve become a painter anyway ... But I painted it, because I remember that evening. I was standing outside the pub under that veranda looking down the street. It was around about half past six in the evening when everybody’s having tea.

— Russell Drysdale,

Drysdale painted the work at his family home in Rose Bay, a harbourside neighbourhood of Sydney. Drysdale's daughter recalled how, as children, she and her brother had been allowed to play around it while he was working on it. A report accompanying an exhibition of his work stated that "Drysdale applied several layers of paint and glaze to render the details with utmost care: the architectural features, cast-iron balconies and posts, the Italianate shopfronts, the blinds lowered against the setting sun".

The painting was once owned by merchant John Landau. Landau allowed the work to be displayed at the Art Gallery of New South Wales until 1996 when his widow Joyce sold the artwork. It was purchased by television executive Reg Grundy and Joy Chambers-Grundy, who retained ownership until at least 2014. The work was hung in the Grundy's London penthouse for around 15 years.

The Art Gallery of New South Wales attempted to purchase the painting at the time but were outbid with the painting selling for "nearly one million dollars". The Curator of the gallery at the time, Barry Pearce, said that it was "the most broken hearted I have been about missing out on a masterpiece."

That deserted country town street, the sun has gone down and there is a light from a single fish and chip shop at the end, probably run by a Greek, and the sky is like this Venetian blue with floating ... looks like something out of Giorgione, or a Titian painting.

— Barry Pearce,

Bland Shire commissioned a bronze and stainless steel bas-relief sculpture commemorating Drysdale's work. The sculpture—sited outside the Tattersalls Hotel in West Wyalong—was unveiled in February 2014.
