= Charles Dyer =

Charles Dyer may refer to:

- Charles Dyer (architect) (1794–1848), British architect
- Charles E. Dyer (1834–1905), American federal judge
- Charles V. Dyer (1808–1878), American abolitionist
- Charles Dyer (playwright) (1928–2021), British playwright and actor, author of the play Staircase
- Charles A. Dyer, former U.S. Marine sergeant and Oath Keepers advocate now imprisoned for child rape
- Charles Gifford Dyer (1846 or 1851 – 1912), American painter
