= Mike Dyer =

Mike Dyer or Michael Dyer may refer to:

- Michael Dyer (born 1990), American football running back
- Mike Dyer (baseball) (born 1966), retired Major League Baseball pitcher
- Mike Dyer (sportswriter) (born 1939), retired sportswriter
