= Three Studies for a Portrait of Henrietta Moraes =

1963 painting by Francis Bacon

Three Studies for the Portrait of Henrietta Moraes, 1963

Three Studies for a Portrait of Henrietta Moraes is an oil-on-canvas 1963 triptych by the Irish-born British figurative painter Francis Bacon. It is one of a series of portraits he painted of his friends, at a time when his art was becoming more personal. Henrietta Moraes (1933–1999) was a close friend and drinking companion of Bacon's from the early 1960s, and became one of his favourite models. She never posed in person for him; instead he worked either from memory or from photographs commissioned from his friend John Deakin.

Comparing the panels to Giorgione's self-portrait in the Herzog Anton Ulrich Museum, Brunswick, art critic John Russell wrote, "This is the most ... that can be said in painting at this time about human beauty".

It was sold at auction in 2022 for £24.3 million after being at the Museum of Modern Art as part of The William S. Paley Collection.

== Description ==
Three Studies for a Portrait of Henrietta Moraes is one of Bacon's most intimate portraits, described by art critic John Russell as a portrait of a person known by the artist "as minutely as one human being can know another". The frames are not intended as a narrative, that is not intended to be read from left to right. More Bacon sought to capture different aspects of her appearance, and to reveal her, as he put it, in the 'most elemental state'.

Detail of the center panel

Each panel shows a tightly cropped image of Moraes' head. She fills each of the small canvases with the background reduced to areas of flat black paint. Her face is contorted to varying degrees in each, a technique reminiscent of some of Picasso's late period female portraits. In fact, the distortions of Bacon's panels are restrained by the standards of his late 1960s and early 70s portraits, in which some of the sitter's faces disappear entirely, replaced by eye sockets, or smears of broad paint representing caved-in cheek or jaw bones. Consistent with this approach, some of Moraes' features are depicted with a heightened intensity, while others are "obliterated".

This relative restraint adds to the stately dignity of this work. Bacon did not intend his distortions or chromatic swirls – often applied by a brush with a towel – as gratuitous indicators of violence or despair as usually assumed, but rather as representations of the effects of time, age and life on the sitter's physical features. In these works, one of Moraes' eyes is enlarged and fixed squarely on the viewer as the rest of her face melts into chaos. Art historian Lawrence Gowing describes the painting in terms of an attempt to capture the "pigment-figment" of close friends. While using tools such as towels to apply broad streaks of paint was chancy and indicated the gambler aspect to his personality, Bacon was sustained by a painterly ability built up during more than 25 years as an artist.

== See also ==
- List of paintings by Francis Bacon

== Sources ==
- Davies, Hugh; Yard, Sally. Francis Bacon. New York: Cross River Press, 1986. ISBN 0-89659-447-5
- Farr, Dennis; Peppiatt, Michael; Yard, Sally. Francis Bacon: A Retrospective. New York: Harry N Abrams, 1999. ISBN 0-8109-2925-2
- Muir, Robin. A Maverick Eye: The Street Photography of John Deakin. London: Thames & Hudson, 2002 ISBN 0-500-54244-9
- Russell, John. Francis Bacon. New York: Norton, 1971. ISBN 0-500-20169-2
