= Two Figures (1953) =

1953 painting by Francis Bacon

- Artist: Francis Bacon
- Year: 1953
- Type: Oil on canvas
- Dimensions: 152.5 cm × 116.5 cm (60.0 in × 45.9 in)
- Location: Private collection

Two Figures (1953) (CR 53–24) is an oil on canvas painting by Francis Bacon, sometimes known as Two Figures on a Bed (or, affectionately, "The Buggers"), from 1953. It measures 152.5 cm × 116.5 cm (60.0 in × 45.9 in), and is in a private collection.

The painting depicts two naked men grappling with each other on a disarrayed bed. One man is astride and gripping the second, lying on his side and exclaiming in agony or perhaps ecstasy. The figures and the bed are painted in light shades of white, blue, pink and lilac on a deep blue background, blurred as if in motion. Apart from the men and the bed, with the bed's brown head and foot boards to either side, the painting is set in an otherwise a featureless and windowless space demarcated by a frame of white lines, and veiled behind a series of vertical lines like a sheer curtain. The composition was based on a motion series of photographs of men wrestling published by Eadweard Muybridge in the 1880s, although that ostensible explanation is often seen as a cover for a depiction of a sadomasochistic homosexual encounter between men who resemble Bacon with his violent lover Peter Lacy on top.

It was painted in late 1952 to early 1953 at Lacy's cottage at Hurst, Berkshire, near Reading, and then exhibited in 1953 at the Hanover Gallery, where the gallery owner Erica Brausen placed it in an upper room to deter scrutiny from the police and others who may have complained that the graphic subject matter was obscene.

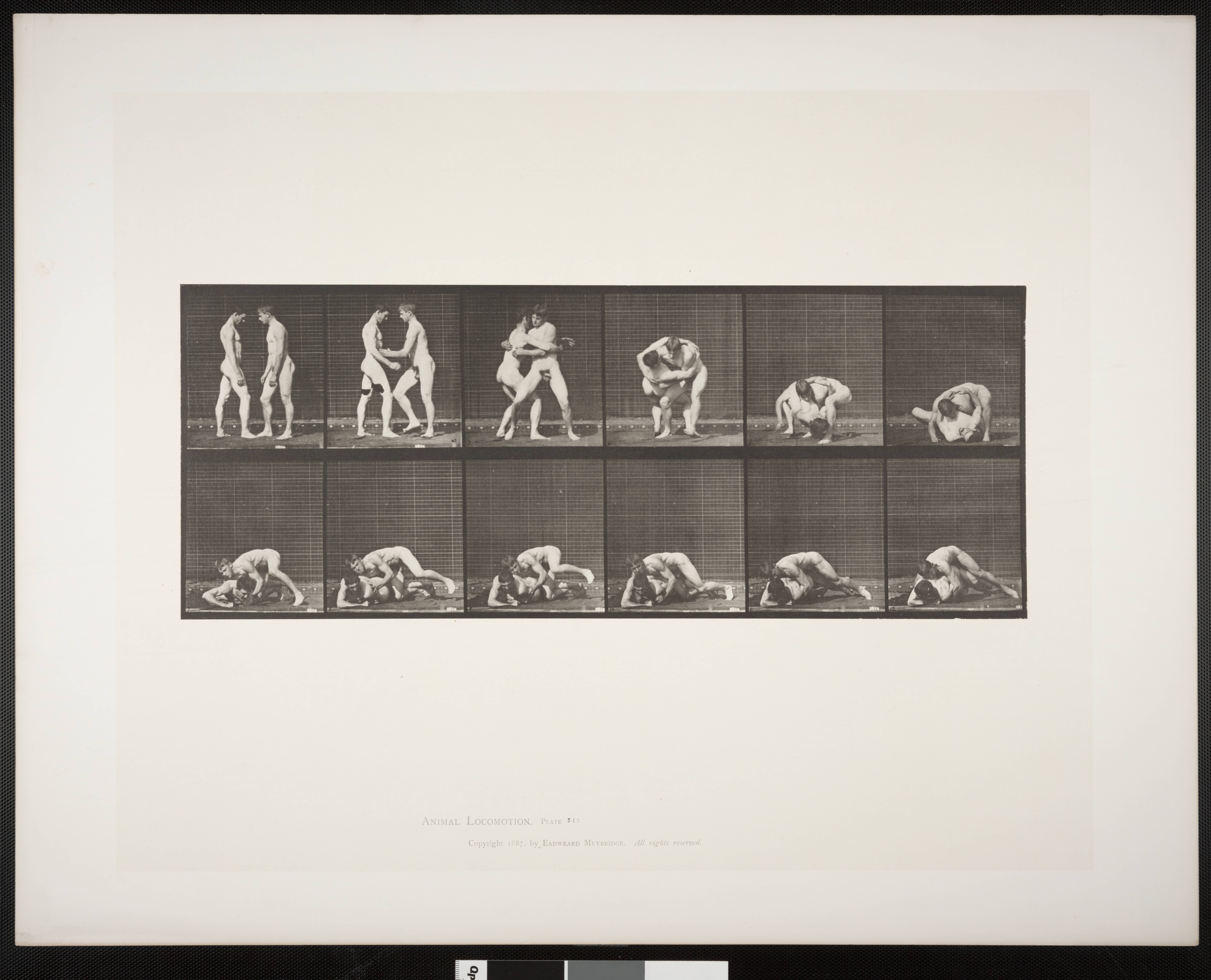
Photographs of nude men wrestling by Eadweard Muybridge, 1880s

In need of money, Bacon sold the painting through art critic David Sylvester to the painter Lucian Freud for only £100 later in 1953. At one stage, Bacon and Freud were friends who admired each other's work, but the two painters fell out. The painting was exhibited at the Bacon retrospective exhibition at the Tate Gallery in 1962, but Freud then kept Bacon's work in his private collection and consistently refused to lend it for exhibition, not even for Bacon's retrospectives at the Grand Palais in Paris in 1971 or at the Tate Gallery again in 1985.

After Freud's death in 2011, it was seen in public for the first time in decades at the Fitzwilliam Museum in 2017–18, and then at "Francis Bacon: Couplings", an exhibition at the Gagosian Gallery in 2019,.

Bacon painted a similar composition of two naked men grappling in his 1954 painting Two Figures in the Grass (CR 54–01), for the central panel of Triptych–August 1972 (CR 72–07), and in his 1980 painting The Wrestlers after Muybridge (CR 80–07).

== See also ==
- List of paintings by Francis Bacon
