= Two Figures Lying on a Bed with Attendants =

1968 triptych painting by Francis Bacon

Two Figures Lying on a Bed with Attendants, 1968

Two Figures Lying on a Bed with Attendants (CR 68–8) is a large triptych painting completed by Francis Bacon in 1968. Painted in oil and pastel on canvas each panel measures 78 in × 58 in (200 cm × 150 cm). The three panels occupy a continuous space which has curved white walls and an oval red floor. The central panel depicts two men lying next to each other in double bed, beneath a Venetian blind. The figures have distorted facial features resembling a monkey. The bed has been identified as one used by Bacon in Morocco. They are observed by a single seated figure in each of the left and right panels, seated in front of a grey aperture. The figures resemble Bacon's lover George Dyer, nude in the left panel, and clothed in the right panel.

The painting was bought in London in 1972 by Farah Pahlavi, third wife of the last Shah of Iran. The Tehran Museum of Contemporary Art was designed by her brother, Kamran Diba, and the work was part of the museum's collection when it opened in 1977. It is still held by the museum in Tehran, but has rarely been exhibited since the Iranian Revolution in 1979.

It was still in the museum's store in 2001, when Stephen Deuchar, the director of Tate Britain, visited Tehran. After meeting Ali Reza Sami Azar, the director of the Tehran museum, Deuchar arranged an exhibition of works to be exchanged between the two galleries, with the Bacon work exhibited in London in September to December 2004. The suspected homosexual overtones of the work impelled state authorities to swift order the central panel from display when the work was briefly exhibited in Tehran.

== See also ==
- List of paintings by Francis Bacon
