= 1896 Rhode Island football team =

American college football season

1896 Rhode Island football
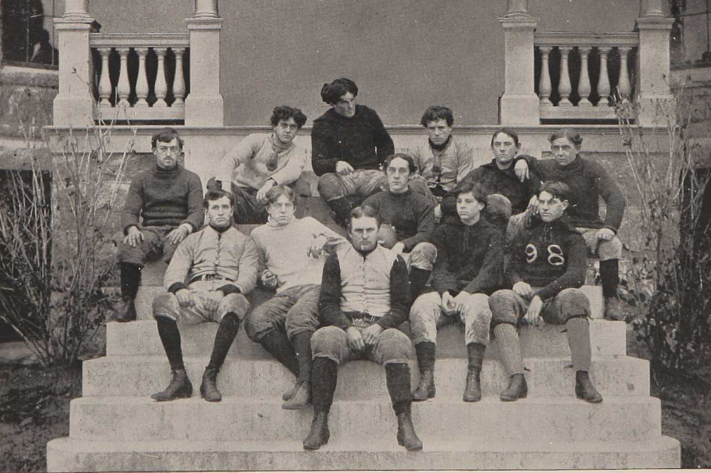
- Conference: Independent
- Record: 0–4
- Head coach: None
- Captain: William C. Clarke

1896 Eastern college football independents records
	Conf.			Overall
Team	W	L	T	W		L		T
Fordham		–		1	–	0	–	0
Lafayette		–		11	–	0	–	1
Princeton		–		10	–	0	–	1
Washington & Jefferson		–		8	–	0	–	1
Penn		–		14	–	1	–	0
Yale		–		13	–	1	–	0
Pittsburgh College		–		11	–	2	–	0
Buffalo		–		9	–	1	–	2
Villanova		–		10	–	4	–	0
Bucknell		–		5	–	2	–	1
Harvard		–		7	–	4	–	0
Boston College		–		5	–	3	–	0
Storrs		–		5	–	3	–	0
Cornell		–		5	–	3	–	1
Syracuse		–		5	–	3	–	2
Temple		–		3	–	2	–	0
Army		–		3	–	2	–	1
Rutgers		–		6	–	6	–	0
Carlisle		–		5	–	5	–	0
Holy Cross		–		2	–	2	–	2
Brown		–		4	–	5	–	1
Wesleyan		–		4	–	5	–	1
Dickinson		–		4	–	5	–	0
Franklin & Marshall		–		3	–	4	–	2
Geneva		–		3	–	4	–	0
Penn State		–		3	–	4	–	0
Colgate		–		3	–	4	–	1
Amherst		–		3	–	6	–	1
Western Univ. Penn.		–		3	–	6	–	0
Lehigh		–		2	–	5	–	0
Tufts		–		2	–	6	–	1
Swarthmore		–		2	–	6	–	0
New Hampshire		–		1	–	4	–	0
Drexel		–		1	–	5	–	0
Massachusetts		–		0	–	4	–	0
Rhode Island		–		0	–	4	–	0

The 1896 Rhode Island football team represented Rhode Island College of Agriculture and the Mechanic Arts, now known as the University of Rhode Island, as an independent during the 1896 college football season. The team had no coach. The team compiled an overall record of 0–4 and were outscored by a total of 36 to 6. It was the team's second season of intercollegiate football.

== Schedule ==
Date	Opponent	Site	Result	Source
October 11	Friends School	Kingston, RI	L 0–8	
October 18	Camp Street Athletics	Kingston, RI	L 0–8	
October 25	Providence High School	Kingston, RI	L 0–2	
November 15	at Friends School		L 6–18	

== Roster ==
Rhode Island 1896 roster
Guards: William F. Harley; James R. Emmett; Tackles: Welcome Carmichael; Harry Page Wilson	Center: Irving Thomas; Ends: Benjamin Carpenter; Harold W. Case	Backs: Edmund D. Cullen; William C. P. Merrill; Robert S. Doughty; William C. Clarke (C)

Reserves were A. Pearson Jr. and Clarence E. Nash.
