= Study of Red Pope 1962. 2nd version 1971 =

1971 painting by Francis Bacon

- Artist: Francis Bacon
- Year: 1971
- Medium: Oil on canvas
- Dimensions: 500 cm × 375 cm (198 in × 147.5 in)

Study of Red Pope 1962. 2nd version 1971 is a 1971 painting by the Irish-born English artist Francis Bacon. It failed to sell at auction in October 2017 with an estimate of £60-80 million. It had not been on public display for 45 years until viewings for its 2017 auction. It is a reinterpretation of his 1962 painting Study from Innocent X. Bacon's lover George Dyer is portrayed in the right side of the painting. The work was shown at the 1971 retrospective of Bacon's work at the Grand Palais.

The juxtaposition of the two figures has been likened to a devotional diptych, Christie's described as "icons of the spirit and the flesh – the sacred and profane".

== See also ==
- List of paintings by Francis Bacon
