= 1896 Army Cadets football team =

American college football season

1896 Army Cadets football
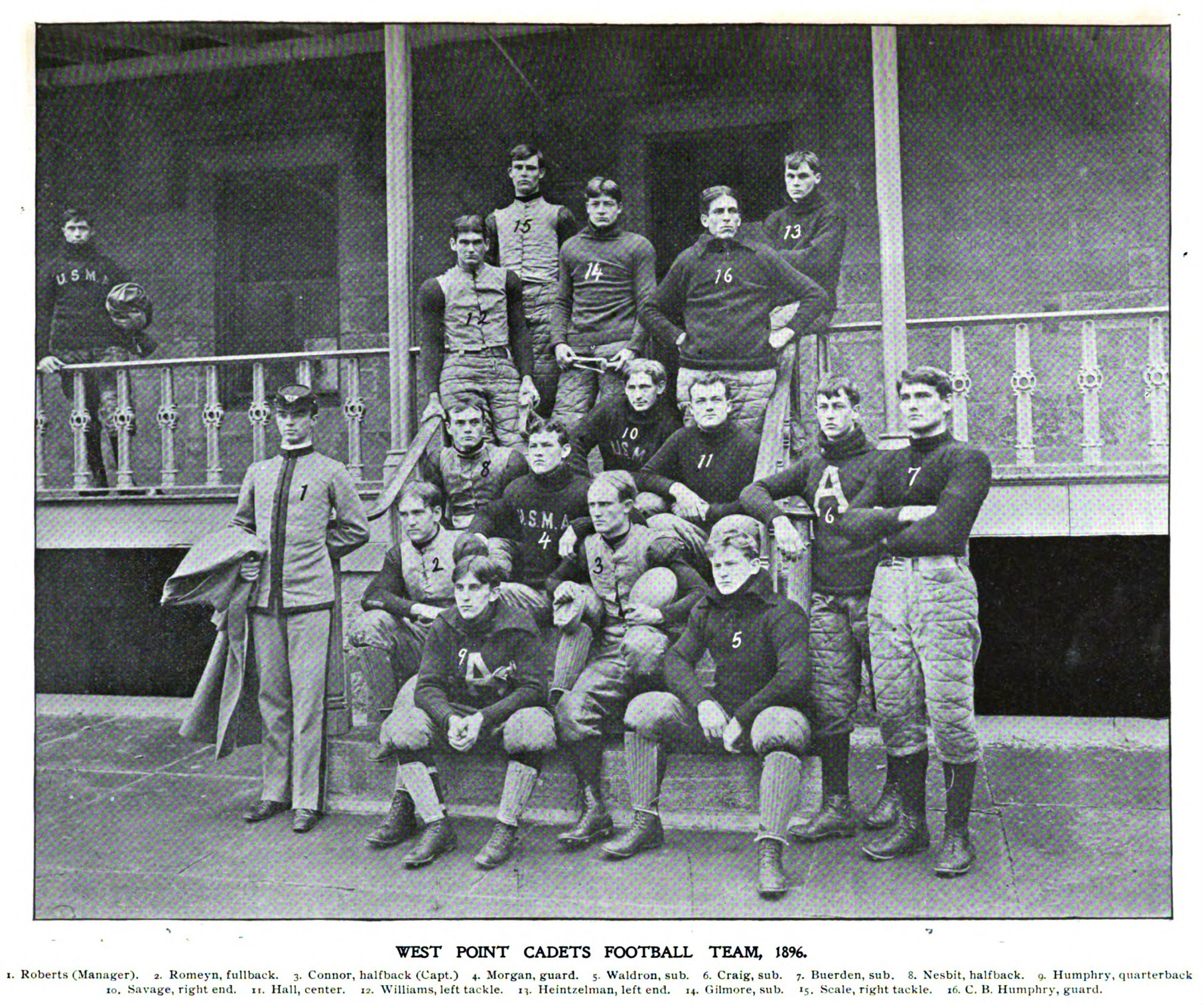
- Conference: Independent
- Record: 3–2–1
- Head coach: George P. Dyer (1st season)
- Captain: William Connor
- Home stadium: The Plain

1896 Eastern college football independents records
	Conf.			Overall
Team	W	L	T	W		L		T
Fordham		–		1	–	0	–	0
Lafayette		–		11	–	0	–	1
Princeton		–		10	–	0	–	1
Washington & Jefferson		–		8	–	0	–	1
Penn		–		14	–	1	–	0
Yale		–		13	–	1	–	0
Pittsburgh College		–		11	–	2	–	0
Buffalo		–		9	–	1	–	2
Villanova		–		10	–	4	–	0
Bucknell		–		5	–	2	–	1
Harvard		–		7	–	4	–	0
Boston College		–		5	–	3	–	0
Storrs		–		5	–	3	–	0
Cornell		–		5	–	3	–	1
Syracuse		–		5	–	3	–	2
Temple		–		3	–	2	–	0
Army		–		3	–	2	–	1
Rutgers		–		6	–	6	–	0
Carlisle		–		5	–	5	–	0
Holy Cross		–		2	–	2	–	2
Brown		–		4	–	5	–	1
Wesleyan		–		4	–	5	–	1
Dickinson		–		4	–	5	–	0
Franklin & Marshall		–		3	–	4	–	2
Geneva		–		3	–	4	–	0
Penn State		–		3	–	4	–	0
Colgate		–		3	–	4	–	1
Western Univ. Penn.		–		3	–	6	–	0
Lehigh		–		2	–	5	–	0
Tufts		–		2	–	6	–	1
Swarthmore		–		2	–	6	–	0
New Hampshire		–		1	–	4	–	0
Drexel		–		1	–	5	–	0
Massachusetts		–		0	–	4	–	0
Rhode Island		–		0	–	4	–	0

The 1896 Army Cadets football team represented the United States Military Academy as an independent during the 1896 college football season. In their first and only season under head coach George P. Dyer, the Cadets compiled a 3–2–1 record and outscored their opponents by a combined total of 93 to 45. The Army–Navy Game was not played in 1896.

No Army Cadets were honored on the 1896 College Football All-America Team.

== Schedule ==
Date	Time	Opponent	Site	Result	Attendance	Source
October 3		Tufts	The Plain; West Point, NY	W 27–0		
October 17	3:20 p.m.	Princeton	The Plain; West Point, NY	L 0–11	5,000	
October 24		Union (NY)	The Plain; West Point, NY	W 44–0		
October 31		Yale	The Plain; West Point, NY	L 2–16		
November 7	3:00 p.m.	Wesleyan	The Plain; West Point, NY	T 12–12		
November 21		Brown	The Plain; West Point, NY	W 8–6	500	
