= Study for Portrait II (After the Life Mask of William Blake) =

Painting by Francis Bacon

Study for Portrait II, 1955. Tate Britain, London

Study for Portrait II (subtitled after the Life Mask of William Blake) is a small 1955 oil-on-canvas painting by the Irish-born British figurative artist Francis Bacon, one of a series of six portraits completed after viewing that year the English poet, painter and printmaker William Blake's (b. 1757) life mask at the National Portrait Gallery in London.

The series resembles Bacon's late-1940s and early-1950s paintings of single bust-length male figures set against anonymous flat undescribed dark backgrounds, and can thus be viewed as extensions of his "Man in Blue" paintings of a few years earlier. The second version, completed in January 1955, is considered the strongest and is in the collection of Tate Britain, London.

== Commission ==
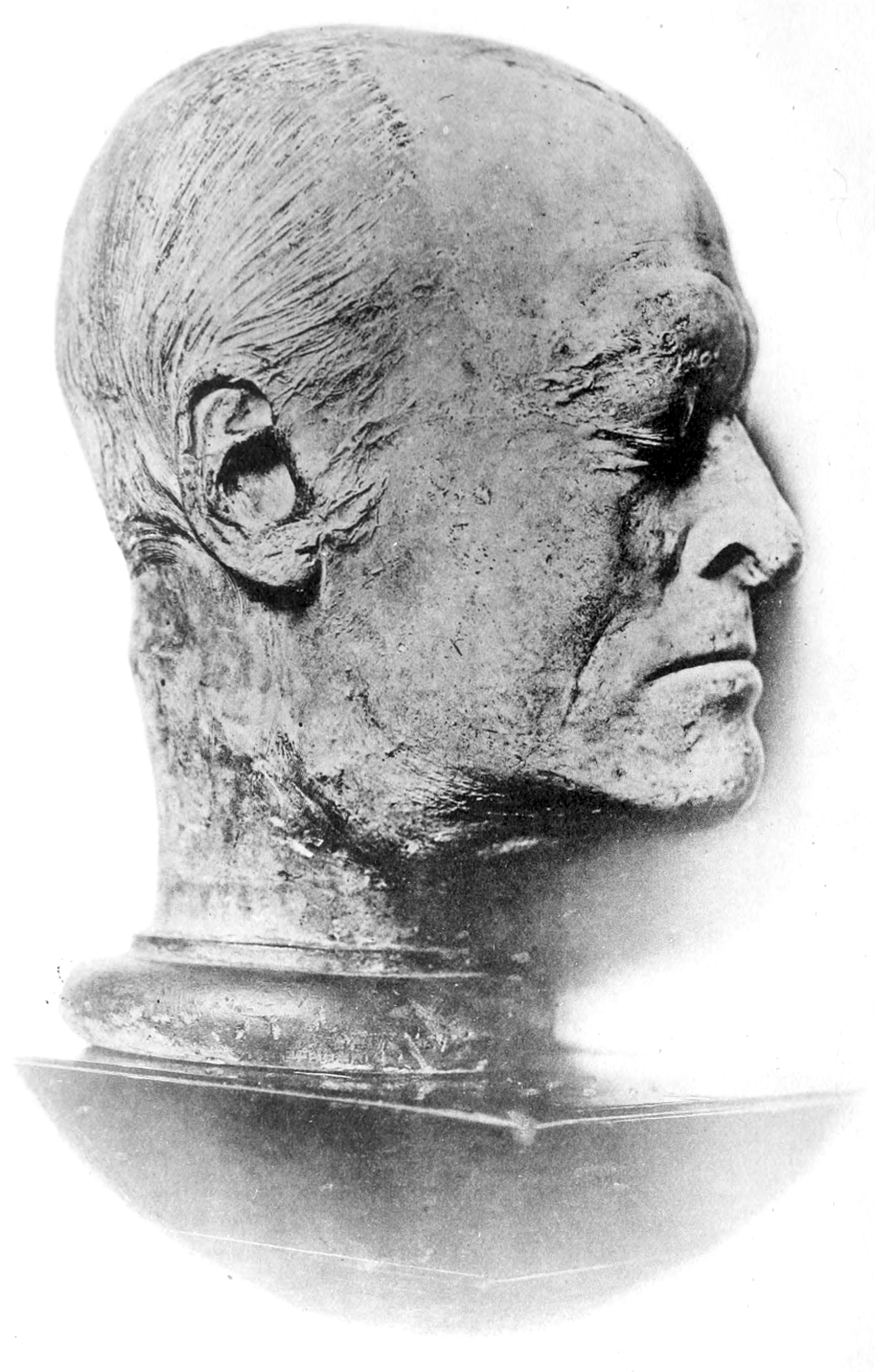
James Deville's 1823 plaster cast. H: 92mm

Bacon became interested in the series after the composer Gerard Schurmann asked him to design the album cover for "Six Songs of William Blake", pieces of music Schurmann had set to a number of Blake's poems. Bacon painted six separate versions, each a variant of his earlier "Man in Blue" series, and Bacon apparently viewed the series as one of his most successful. As so often with Bacon's portraits, each of the works is provisionally titled as a "Study"; according to art critic Jonathan Jones, this may be because Bacon saw the Blake paintings only as "[attempts] to get at the essence of what a portrait is."

== Description ==
Bacon did not work from a cast of the head, but instead from a black and white photograph supplied by the gallery, although a plaster replica of the mask was found in his bedroom at Reece Mews after his death. Study II is considered the most artistically successful of the series, and is described as consisting of "broad strokes of pink and mauve, with which Bacon establishes an equivocation between waxen mask and human flesh, drag pain and loneliness and imperturbable spirit in their wake."

Blake was in his mid-sixties when the cast was made by the sculptor and phrenologist James De Ville, whose method and approach were influenced by his teacher, the English sculptor Joseph Nollekens, who, to avoid suffocation, provided his models with straws while submerged in the casting material. Although Bacon's work is titled as a "life mask", the painting more resembles a death mask, as evidenced by the dark, flat, simplified background and the figure's closed eyes and pallid skin. His lips are tightly pursed and turned downward as in Deville's cast. While his left eye is tightly shut, his right eyebrow is raised. Jones writes that, with this painting, Bacon "apprehends something beneath the visible skin: an inner self, suffering in absolute isolation." In this, Bacon's portrait resembles Deville's original cast, which was viewed favourably by those who knew Blake. The National Portrait Gallery notes how Blake's friend, the artist George Richmond (1809–96) "said that the unnatural severity of the mouth was caused by the discomfort of the process 'as the plaster pulled out a quantity of his hair.'"

The portrait has been described as similar to Blake's c. 1819–20 miniature painting Ghost of a Flea in its "fleshy, monstrous intensity, [and] the authority of a vision seen in darkness."

== See also ==
- List of paintings by Francis Bacon

== Sources ==
- Peppiatt, Michael. Anatomy of an Enigma. London: Westview Press, 1996. ISBN 978-0-8133-3520-9
- Sylvester, David. Looking back at Francis Bacon. London: Thames and Hudson, 2000. ISBN 0500019940
- Van Alphen, Ernst. Francis Bacon and the Loss of Self. London: Reaktion Books, 1992. ISBN 0-948462-33-7
