= USS Dyer =

Wickes-class destroyer

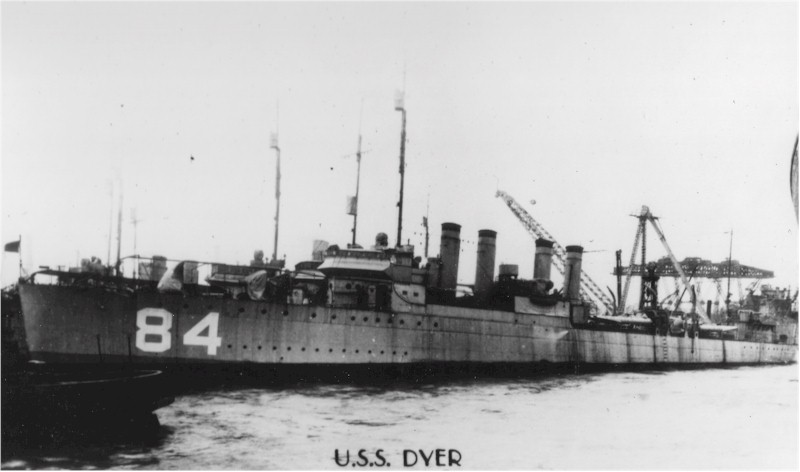
- USS Dyer (DD-84)

History

United States
- Namesake: Nehemiah Mayo Dyer
- Builder: Fore River Shipyard, Quincy, Massachusetts
- Laid down: 26 September 1917
- Launched: 13 April 1918
- Commissioned: 1 July 1918
- Decommissioned: 7 June 1922
- Stricken: 7 January 1936
- Fate: Sold, 8 September 1936

General characteristics
- Class & type: Wickes-class destroyer
- Displacement: 1,202–1,208 long tons (1,221–1,227 t) (standard); 1,295–1,322 long tons (1,316–1,343 t) (deep load)
- Length: 314 ft 4 in (95.8 m)
- Beam: 30 ft 11 in (9.42 m)
- Draught: 9 ft 10 in (3.0 m)
- Installed power: 27,000 shp (20,000 kW); 4 water-tube boilers
- Propulsion: 2 shafts, 2 steam turbines
- Speed: 35 knots (65 km/h; 40 mph) (design)
- Range: 2,500 nautical miles (4,600 km; 2,900 mi) at 20 knots (37 km/h; 23 mph) (design)
- Complement: 6 officers, 108 enlisted men
- Armament: 4 × single 4-inch (102 mm) guns; 2 × single 1-pounder AA guns; 4 × triple 21 inch (533 mm) torpedo tubes; 2 × depth charge rails

USS Dyer (DD-84) was a Wickes-class destroyer built for the United States Navy during World War I.

== Description ==
The Wickes class was an improved and faster version of the preceding Caldwell-class. Two different designs were prepared to the same specification that mainly differed in the turbines and boilers used. The ships built to the Bethlehem Steel design, built in the Fore River and Union Iron Works shipyards, mostly used Yarrow boilers that deteriorated badly during service and were mostly scrapped during the 1930s. The ships displaced 1,202–1,208 long tons (1,221–1,227 t) at standard load and 1,295–1,322 long tons (1,316–1,343 t) at deep load. They had an overall length of 314 feet 4 inches (95.8 m), a beam of 30 feet 11 inches (9.4 m) and a draught of 9 feet 10 inches (3.0 m). They had a crew of 6 officers and 108 enlisted men.

Performance differed radically between the ships of the class, often due to poor workmanship. The Wickes class was powered by two steam turbines, each driving one propeller shaft, using steam provided by four water-tube boilers. The turbines were designed to produce a total of 27,000 shaft horsepower (20,000 kW) intended to reach a speed of 35 knots (65 km/h; 40 mph). The ships carried 225 long tons (229 t) of fuel oil which was intended gave them a range of 2,500 nautical miles (4,600 km; 2,900 mi) at 20 knots (37 km/h; 23 mph).

The ships were armed with four 4-inch (102 mm) guns in single mounts and were fitted with two 1-pounder guns for anti-aircraft defense. Their primary weapon, though, was their torpedo battery of a dozen 21 inch (533 mm) torpedo tubes in four triple mounts. In many ships a shortage of 1-pounders caused them to be replaced by 3-inch (76 mm) anti-aircraft (AA) guns. They also carried a pair of depth charge rails. A "Y-gun" depth charge thrower was added to many ships.

== Construction and career ==
Dyer, named for Nehemiah Dyer was launched 13 April 1918 by the Fore River Shipbuilding Company, Quincy, Massachusetts, sponsored by Miss Virginia Blackmur, and commissioned 1 July 1918. Assigned to U.S. patrol squadrons based on Gibraltar, Dyer sailed from New York 9 July 1918 with Assistant Secretary of the Navy Franklin Delano Roosevelt embarked for transportation to Plymouth, England. Arriving 21 July Dyer got underway 5 days later arriving Gibraltar on the 29th. On 4 August she began her service as escort for merchant convoys and Army transports between Gibraltar and Marseille, France, making nine such voyages until the end of hostilities.

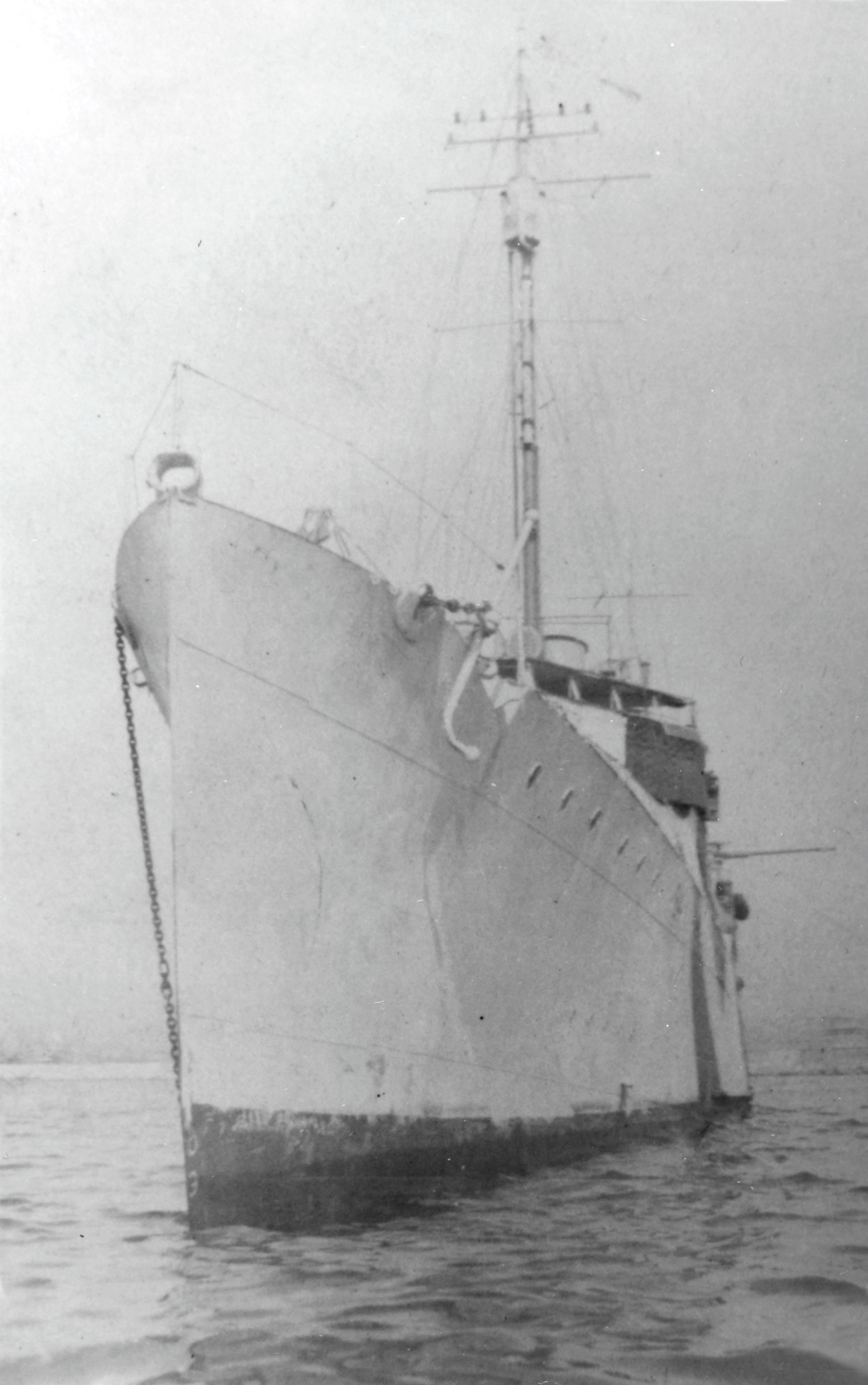

Dyer departed Gibraltar 29 January 1919 for service with U.S. Naval Forces in the central and eastern Mediterranean, and called at Split and Kotor, Dalmatia (today in Croatia and in Montenegro), and Brindisi, Italy, Constantinople, Turkey, and Beirut, Lebanon, before arriving at Venice 5 February. Operating from Venice as flagship for the force, Dyer took part in relief activities in the Balkans and Middle East, carried passengers and supplies in the Adriatic and aided in the execution of the terms of the Austrian Armistice until 16 April, when she sailed for the United States. Dyer arrived at New York 14 June 1919 with two Members of Congress embarked.

Between 1 October 1919 and 31 October 1920, Dyer was in reserve, in reduced commission. She operated out of Charleston, South Carolina, until 3 April 1922 when she sailed to Philadelphia Navy Yard. Dyer was decommissioned there 7 June 1922 and sold 8 September 1936.

As of 2019, no other ships in the United States Navy have carried this name.
