= Thiselton =

Thiselton may refer to:

- Anthony Thiselton (born 1937), English Anglican priest
- Thiselton-Dyer, a double-barrelled name
- Thiseltonia, a genus of Australian plants
