= Bert Dyer =

English footballer

Personal information
- Full name: Albert Edward Dyer
- Date of birth: 20 December 1886
- Place of birth: Portsmouth, England
- Height: 5 ft 10 in (1.78 m)
- Position: Inside forward

Senior career*
Years	Team	Apps	(Gls)
1906–1908	Southampton	1	(0)
1908	Gainsborough Trinity	0	(0)
1908–1909	Eastleigh Athletic		
1909–1910	Southampton Cambridge		
1910–1911	Woolston		
1911–1912	Bitterne Guild		
1912–1913	Southampton Cambridge		
1913–1915	Romsey Town		
- * Club domestic league appearances and goals

Albert Edward Dyer (born 20 December 1886) was an English footballer who played as an inside-forward for Southampton in the 1900s.

== Football career ==
Dyer was born in Portsmouth and played youth football in Southampton where he was spotted by Southampton F.C. for whom he signed in the 1906 close season.

He spent most of his career at The Dell in the reserves and made his solitary first-team appearance at Northampton Town on 6 April 1907 when Sam Jepp was taken ill shortly before kick-off. Dyer played at inside-right with Frank Jefferis moving to the left and Wally Radford moving into the centre-forward position. The match finished 4–2 to Southampton, with two goals from Radford and one each from Patten and Mouncher.

Dyer remained with the "Saints" until September 1908 playing reserve-team football. He then briefly joined Gainsborough Trinity of The Football League, but returned to Hampshire within a month and was taken on by Eastleigh Athletic, whom he helped win the Hampshire Senior Cup in 1909.

Dyer then moved between various local clubs until his football career was ended by the First World War.
