= List of paintings by Francis Bacon =

This is an incomplete list of paintings by the Irish-born British painter Francis Bacon (1909–1992).

== 1930s ==
c.1929–30

- Painting (Oil on canvas, 91.5 cm × 61 cm (36.0 in × 24.0 in), Private Collection (long term loan to the Tate Gallery))

1933

- Crucifixion (Oil on canvas, 60.5 cm × 47 cm (23.8 in × 18.5 in), Private collection of Damien Hirst (Murderme), London)

c.1936

- Figures in a Garden (aka Seated Figure, The Fox and the Grapes, and Goering and his Lion Cub) (Oil on canvas, 74 cm × 94 cm (29 in × 37 in), Tate Gallery, London)

== 1940s ==
1944

- Three Studies for Figures at the Base of a Crucifixion (Oil and pastel on Sundeala board, 94 cm × 74 cm (37 in × 29 in), Tate, London) (large triptych)

1945

- Figure in a landscape (Oil on canvas, 144.8 cm × 128.3 cm (57.0 in × 50.5 in), Tate, London)

1945–46

- Figure Study I (Oil on canvas, 123 cm × 105.5 cm (48.4 in × 41.5 in), Scottish National Gallery of Modern Art, Edinburgh)
- Figure Study II (Oil on canvas, 145 cm × 129 cm (57 in × 51 in), Huddersfield Art Gallery, Huddersfield)

1946

- Painting (Oil and pastel on linen, 198 cm × 132 cm (77 7/8 in × 52 in), Museum of Modern Art, New York City)

1947–48

- Head I (Oil and tempera on hardboard, 100.3 cm × 74.9 cm (39.5 in × 29.5 in), Metropolitan Museum of Art, New York City)

1949

- Head II (Oil on canvas, 80 cm × 63.6 cm (31.5 in × 25.0 in), Ulster Museum, Belfast)
- Head III (Oil on canvas, 81 cm × 66 cm (32 in × 26 in), Private collection)
- Head IV (Man with a Monkey) (Oil on canvas, 82 cm × 66 cm (32 in × 26 in), Private collection)
- Head V (Oil on canvas) Private collection)
- Head VI (Oil on canvas, 93.2 cm × 76.5 cm (36.7 in × 30.1 in), Arts Council Collection, London)
- Study from the human body (Oil on canvas, 147.2 cm × 130.6 cm (58.0 in × 51.4 in), National Gallery of Victoria, Melbourne)

== 1950s ==
1950

- Man at Curtain (Oil and cotton wool on canvas, 140 cm × 108.5 cm (55.1 in × 42.7 in), The Lambrecht-Schadeberg Collection, permanent loan to Museum für Gegenwartskunst Siegen, Siegen)
- Fragment of a Crucifixion (Oil and cotton wool on canvas, 140 cm × 108.5 cm (55.1 in × 42.7 in), Stedelijk van Abbemuseum, Eindhoven)
- Study for a Figure (Oil and cotton wool on canvas, 140 cm × 108.5 cm (55.1 in × 42.7 in), Private Collection)
- Study after Velázquez (Oil on canvas, 198 cm × 137 cm (78 in × 54 in), The Steven and Alexander Cohen Collection)
- 'Study after Velázquez' (Oil on canvas, 198 cm × 137 cm (78 in × 54 in), Private Collection)
- Painting (Oil on canvas, 198 cm × 132 cm (78 in × 52 in), Leeds Museum and Galleries, Leeds Art Gallery, Leeds)

1951

- Figure with Monkey (Oil on canvas, 66 cm × 56 cm (26 in × 22 in), Private Collection)
- Head (Oil on canvas, 62.9 cm × 53.3 cm (24.8 in × 21.0 in), Cleveland Museum of Art, Cleveland)
- Study for Nude (Oil on canvas, 198 cm × 137 cm (78 in × 54 in), Private Collection)
- Portrait of Lucian Freud (Oil and sand on canvas, 198 cm × 137 cm (78 in × 54 in), Whitworth Art Gallery, Manchester University, Manchester)
- Pope I (Oil on canvas, 198 cm × 137 cm (78 in × 54 in), Aberdeen Art Gallery and Museums Collection, Aberdeen)
- Pope II (Oil and sand on canvas, 198 cm × 137 cm (78 in × 54 in), Kunsthalle Mannheim, Mannheim)
- Pope III (Oil on canvas, 198 cm × 137 cm (78 in × 54 in), Private Collection)
- 'Crouching Nude' (Oil on canvas, 196.2 cm × 135.2 cm (77.2 in × 53.2 in), Private Collection)
- 'Figure' (Oil on canvas, 198.1 cm × 137.2 cm (78.0 in × 54.0 in), Private Collection)

1952

- Study for Crouching Nude (Oil on canvas, 198 cm × 137 cm (78 in × 54 in), Detroit Institute of Arts, Detroit)
- House in Barbados (Oil on canvas, 66 cm × 56 cm (26 in × 22 in), Private Collection)
- Dog (Oil and sand on canvas, 198 cm × 137 cm (78 in × 54 in), Tate Gallery, London)
- Landscape (Oil on canvas, 139.5 cm × 108.5 cm (54.9 in × 42.7 in), Private Collection)
- Study of a Head (Oil on canvas, 50 cm × 40.5 cm (19.7 in × 15.9 in), Yale Centre for British Art, New Haven)
- Study for a Head (Oil and sand on canvas, 66 cm × 56 cm (26 in × 22 in), Jane Davis Lang)
- Study for a Portrait (Oil on canvas, 51 cm × 41 cm (20 in × 16 in), Private Collection)
- Study for a Portrait (Oil on canvas, 61 cm × 51 cm (24 in × 20 in), Private Collection, Belgium)
- Study for Head (Oil on canvas, 61 cm × 51 cm (24 in × 20 in), Private Collection)
- Landscape (Oil on canvas, 198 cm × 137 cm (78 in × 54 in), The Carnegie Museum of Art, Pittsburgh)
- Study of Figure in a Landscape (Oil on canvas, 198 cm × 137 cm (78 in × 54 in), The Phillips Collection, Washington, D.C.)
- Man Kneeling in Grass (Oil on canvas, 198 cm × 137 cm (78 in × 54 in), Private Collection, Milan)
- Elephant Fording a River (Oil on canvas, 198 cm × 137 cm (78 in × 54 in), Private Collection)
- Rhinoceros (Oil on canvas, 198 cm × 137 cm (78 in × 54 in), Destroyed by the artist)
- Dog (Oil on canvas, 199 cm × 138 cm (78 in × 54 in), Private Collection)
- Dog (Oil on canvas, 198 cm × 138.5 cm (78.0 in × 54.5 in), Private Collection)
- Landscape, South of France (Oil on canvas, 127 cm × 101 cm (50 in × 40 in), Private Collection)
- Man Eating a Leg of Chicken (Oil and sand on canvas, 61 cm × 51 cm (24 in × 20 in), Private Collection)
- Man in a Chair (Oil on canvas, 60.5 cm × 50 cm (23.8 in × 19.7 in), Private Collection)
- 'Man on a Rowing Machine' (Oil on canvas, 198 cm × 137 cm (78 in × 54 in), Ca' la Ghironda Modern Art Museum, Zola Predosa)
- 'Marching Figures' (Oil on canvas, 198.1 cm × 137.2 cm (78.0 in × 54.0 in), Private Collection)
- 'Figure with Raised Arm' (Oil on canvas, 152.1 cm × 116.2 cm (59.9 in × 45.7 in), Dublin City Gallery The Hugh Lane, Dublin)
- 'Crouching Nude' (Oil and cotton wool on canvas, 196.8 cm × 136.5 cm (77.5 in × 53.7 in), Private Collection)
- 'Figures in a Landscape' (Oil and alkyd paint on canvas, 198 cm × 137.2 cm (78.0 in × 54.0 in), Private Collection)

1953

- Study of a Nude (1952–53) (Oil on canvas, 61 cm × 51 cm (24 in × 20 in), Sainsbury Centre for Visual Arts, Norwich)
- Study after Velázquez's Portrait of Pope Innocent X (Oil on canvas, 152 cm × 118 cm (60 in × 46 in), Des Moines Art Center, Des Moines)
- Study for a Portrait (Oil on canvas, 152.5 cm × 118 cm (60.0 in × 46.5 in), Hamburger Kunsthalle, Hamburg)
- 'Man on a Chaise-Longue' (Oil on canvas, 152 cm × 118 cm (60 in × 46 in), Private Collection, Italy)
- 'Sea' (Oil on canvas, 152 cm × 118 cm (60 in × 46 in), Private Collection)
- Man with Dog (Oil on canvas, 152 cm × 117 cm (60 in × 46 in), Albright-Knox Art Gallery, Buffalo)
- Study for Portrait I (Oil on canvas, 152 cm × 118 cm (60 in × 46 in), Private Collection)
- Study for a Portrait II (Oil on canvas, 153.5 cm × 115.5 cm (60.4 in × 45.5 in), Private Collection)
- Study for Portrait III (Oil on canvas, 152.5 cm × 116.5 cm (60.0 in × 45.9 in), Private Collection)
- Study for Portrait IV (Oil on canvas, 152.5 cm × 116 cm (60.0 in × 45.7 in), The Frances Lehman Loeb Art Centre, Vassar College, Poughkeepsie)
- Study for Portrait V (Oil on canvas, 152.7 cm × 117.1 cm (60.1 in × 46.1 in), Hirshhorn Museum and Sculpture Garden, Smithsonian Institution, Washington, D.C.)
- Study for Portrait VI (Oil on canvas, 152.5 cm × 117 cm (60.0 in × 46.1 in), Minneapolis Institute of the Arts, Minneapolis)
- Study for Portrait VII (Oil on canvas, 152.5 cm × 117 cm (60.0 in × 46.1 in), Museum of Modern Art, New York)
- Study for Portrait VIII (Oil on canvas, 152.5 cm × 117 cm (60.0 in × 46.1 in), Private Collection)
- Sphinx I (Oil on canvas, 199.5 cm × 137 cm (78.5 in × 53.9 in), Private Collection)
- Sphinx II (Oil on canvas, 199 cm × 137 cm (78 in × 54 in), Yale University Art Gallery, New Haven)
- Study of a Baboon (Oil on canvas, 198 cm × 137 cm (78 in × 54 in), Museum of Modern Art, New York)
- Study for Figure I (Oil on canvas, 198 cm × 137 cm (78 in × 54 in), Private Collection)
- Study for Figure II (Oil on canvas, 198 cm × 137 cm (78 in × 54 in), Janine and J. Tomilson Hill)
- Study of Figure in a Room (Oil on canvas, 198 cm × 136.5 cm (78.0 in × 53.7 in), Private Collection, London)
- 'Lying Figure' (Oil on canvas, 175 cm × 129 cm (69 in × 51 in), Private Collection, Rome)
- Study of the Human Head (Oil on canvas, 61 cm × 51 cm (24 in × 20 in), Private Collection)
- Three Studies of the Human Head (Oil on canvas, triptych; each panel 61 cm × 51 cm (24 in × 20 in), Private Collection)
- Two Figures (Oil on canvas, 152.5 cm × 116.5 cm (60.0 in × 45.9 in), Private Collection)
- Two Figures at a Window (Oil on canvas, 152.5 cm × 116.5 cm (60.0 in × 45.9 in), Private Collection, London)
- Portrait of a Man (Oil on canvas, 152.5 cm × 117 cm (60.0 in × 46.1 in), Private Collection)
- Sphinx (Oil on canvas, 151 cm × 116 cm (59 in × 46 in), Toyota Municipal Museum of Art, Toyota)
- The End of the Line (Oil on canvas, 152.5 cm × 117 cm (60.0 in × 46.1 in), Private Collection)
- Study for a Portrait (Oil on canvas, 198 cm × 137 cm (78 in × 54 in), The V-A-C Collection, Moscow)
- Monkey (Oil on canvas, 61 cm × 51 cm (24 in × 20 in), Private Collection)
- 'Portrait of a Man Walking' (Oil on canvas, 151.1 cm × 117.8 cm (59.5 in × 46.4 in), Private Collection)
- 'Pope' (Oil on canvas, 152.3 cm × 94 cm (60.0 in × 37.0 in), Private Collection)

1954

- Man in Blue I (Oil on canvas, 197 cm × 135 cm (78 in × 53 in), Museum Boijmans Van Beuningen, Rotterdam)
- Man in Blue II (Oil on canvas, 152 cm × 116.5 cm (59.8 in × 45.9 in), Private Collection)
- Man in Blue III (Oil on canvas, 152.5 cm × 117 cm (60.0 in × 46.1 in), Private Collection)
- Man in Blue IV (Oil on canvas, 198 cm × 137 cm (78 in × 54 in), Museum Moderner Kunst Stiftung Ludwig, Vienna)
- Man in Blue V (Oil on canvas, 198 cm × 137 cm (78 in × 54 in), Kunstsammlung Nordrhein-Westfalen, Düsseldorf)
- Man in Blue VI (Oil on canvas, 151 cm × 118 cm (59 in × 46 in), Private Collection)
- Man in Blue VII (Oil on canvas, 152.5 cm × 117 cm (60.0 in × 46.1 in), Private Collection)
- Sphinx (Oil on canvas, 198.7 cm × 137.1 cm (78.2 in × 54.0 in), Hirshhorn Museum and Sculpture Garden, Washington, D.C.)
- Study of a Dog (Oil on canvas, 152.5 cm × 118 cm (60.0 in × 46.5 in), National Gallery of Art, Washington, D.C.)
- Figure with Meat (Oil on canvas, 129 cm × 122 cm (51 in × 48 in), Art Institute of Chicago, Chicago)
- Pope (Oil on canvas, 152.3 cm × 116.5 cm (60.0 in × 45.9 in), Private Collection)
- Two Americans (Oil on canvas, 68 cm × 74.5 cm (26.8 in × 29.3 in), Private Collection)
- Study for a Portrait (Oil on canvas, 66 cm × 53.5 cm (26.0 in × 21.1 in), Private Collection)
- Figures in a Landscape (Oil on cardboard, 66 cm × 51 cm (26 in × 20 in), Private Collection)
- A Performing Dog (Oil on canvas, 198.1 cm × 137.8 cm (78.0 in × 54.3 in), Private Collection)
- 'Seated Figure' (Oil on canvas, 198 cm × 137 cm (78 in × 54 in), Private Collection)
- Untitled (Oil on canvas, 152.4 cm × 115 cm (60.0 in × 45.3 in), Private Collection)

1955

- Study for Portrait I (after the Life Mask of William Blake) (Oil on canvas, 61 cm × 51 cm (24 in × 20 in), Private Collection)
- Study for Portrait II (after the Life Mask of William Blake) (Oil on canvas, 61 cm × 51 cm (24 in × 20 in), Tate Britain, London)
- Study for Portrait III (after the Life Mask of William Blake) (Oil on canvas, 61 cm × 51 cm (24 in × 20 in), Private Collection)
- Head in Grey (Oil on canvas, 61 cm × 51 cm (24 in × 20 in), Walker Art Center, Minneapolis)
- Small Study for Portrait (Oil on canvas, 61 cm × 51 cm (24 in × 20 in), The Lambrecht-Schadeberg Collection / Winners of the Rubens Prize of the City of Siegen, permanent loan in the Museum für Gegenwartskunst Siegen, Siegen)
- Study for a Head (Oil on canvas, 101.5 cm × 76 cm (40.0 in × 29.9 in), Private Collection)
- Man Drinking (Oil on canvas, 61 cm × 51 cm (24 in × 20 in), Private Collection)
- Chimpanzee (Oil on canvas, 152.5 cm × 117 cm (60.0 in × 46.1 in), Staatsgalerie, Stuttgart)
- Portrait of R.J. Sainsbury (Oil on canvas, 61 cm × 51 cm (24 in × 20 in), Sainsbury Centre for Visual Arts, Norwich)
- Study for Portrait IV (after the Life Mask of William Blake) (Oil on canvas, 61.5 cm × 51 cm (24.2 in × 20.1 in), c. 1955, Museum of Modern Art, New York)
- Study for a Pope (Oil on canvas, 152.5 cm × 117 cm (60.0 in × 46.1 in), Private Collection)
- Man with Head Wound (Oil on canvas, 113.5 cm × 99 cm (44.7 in × 39.0 in), Private Collection, Germany)
- Figure Sitting (Oil on canvas, 152.5 cm × 117 cm (60.0 in × 46.1 in), S.M.A.K. Stedelijk Museum voor Actuele Kunst, Ghent)
- Head with Raised Arm (Oil on canvas, 61 cm × 51 cm (24 in × 20 in), Whereabouts Unknown)
- Study (Oil on canvas, 108.6 cm × 75.6 cm (42.8 in × 29.8 in), Sainsbury Centre for Visual Arts, Norwich)
- Sketch for a Portrait of Lisa (Oil on canvas, 61 cm × 51 cm (24 in × 20 in), Sainsbury Centre for Visual Arts, Norwich)
- 'Lisa Sainsbury' (?) (Oil on canvas, 50.2 cm × 64.7 cm (19.8 in × 25.5 in), c. 1955, Private Collection)

1956

- Self-Portrait (Oil on canvas, 198.12 x 137.16 cm, Modern Art Museum of Fort Worth, Fort Worth)
- Head (Oil on canvas, 61 x 51 cm, 1956, Private Collection)
- Study for Portrait of Van Gogh I (Oil and sand on canvas, 152.5 x 117 cm, Sainsbury Centre for Visual Arts, Norwich)
- Portrait of Lisa (Oil on canvas, 101.5 x 73.5 cm, Sainsbury Centre for Visual Arts, Norwich)
- Study for Portrait II (Oil on canvas, 152.5 x 116.5 cm, Janine and J. Tomilson Hill)
- Study for Portrait I (Oil on canvas, 197 x 141.5 cm, The National Gallery of Canada, Ottawa)
- Man Carrying a Child (Oil on canvas, 198 x 142 cm, 1956, Private Collection)
- Study for Portrait V (after the Life Mask of William Blake) (Oil on canvas, 36 x 30.5 cm, 1956, Private Collection)
- Owls (Oil on canvas, 61 x 51 cm, Private Collection)
- Figure in Mountain Landscape (Oil on canvas, 152.5 x 118 cm, Kunsthaus Zürich, Vereinigung Zürcher Kunstfreunde, Zürich)
- Figures in a Landscape (Oil on canvas, 147.3 x 132.1 cm, Private Collection)

1956–57

- Figures in a Landscape (Oil on canvas, 152.5 cm × 118 cm (60.0 in × 46.5 in), 1956–1957, Birmingham City Museum and Art Gallery, Birmingham)
- Study for Figure IV (Oil on canvas, 152.5 cm × 117 cm (60.0 in × 46.1 in), 1956–1957, Art Gallery of South Australia, Adelaide)
- Study for Figure V (Oil on canvas, 152.5 cm × 119 cm (60.0 in × 46.9 in), 1956–1957, University of California Berkeley Art Museum, Berkeley)
- Study for Figure VI (Oil on canvas, 152.5 cm × 119 cm (60.0 in × 46.9 in), 1956–1957, Hatton Gallery, University of Newcastle, Newcastle)
- Study for Portrait IX (Oil on canvas, 152.5 cm × 116.5 cm (60.0 in × 45.9 in), 1956–1957, Private collection)

1957

- Study for Portrait X (Oil on canvas, 198 cm × 142 cm (78 in × 56 in), Private Collection)
- Skull of a Gorilla (Oil on canvas, 152.5 cm × 116.5 cm (60.0 in × 45.9 in), Fractionally owned by a private collection, USA, and San Francisco Museum of Modern Art, San Francisco)
- Study for the Nurse in the film Battleship Potemkin (Oil on canvas, 198 cm × 142 cm (78 in × 56 in), Städel Museum, Frankfurt)
- Study for Chimpanzee (Oil on canvas, 152.5 cm × 116.5 cm (60.0 in × 45.9 in), Peggy Guggenheim Collection, Venice)
- Study for Portrait of Van Gogh II (Oil on canvas, 198 cm × 142 cm (78 in × 56 in), Private Collection)- Titled On the Road to Tarascon on reverse
- Study for Portrait of Van Gogh III (Oil and sand on canvas, 198.4 cm × 142.5 cm (78.1 in × 56.1 in), Hirshhorn Museum and Sculpture Garden, Smithsonian Institution, Washington, D.C.)
- Study for Portrait of Van Gogh V (Oil and sand on canvas, 198.7 cm × 137.5 cm (78.2 in × 54.1 in), Hirshhorn Museum and Sculpture Garden, Smithsonian Institution, Washington, D.C.)
- Study for Portrait of Van Gogh VI (Oil on canvas, 202.5 cm × 142 cm (79.7 in × 55.9 in), The Arts Council of Great Britain)
- Van Gogh in a Landscape (Oil on canvas, 152.5 cm × 119.5 cm (60.0 in × 47.0 in), Centre Pompidou, Musée national d'art moderne, Paris)
- Figure in a Landscape (Miss Diana Watson) (Oil on canvas, 198 cm × 137 cm (78 in × 54 in), Private Collection)
- Portrait of Lisa (Oil on canvas, 61 cm × 51 cm (24 in × 20 in), Sainsbury Centre for Visual Arts, Norwich)
- Van Gogh Going to Work (Oil on canvas, 152.5 cm × 119.5 cm (60.0 in × 47.0 in), Private Collection): Titled and signed on the reverse
- Study for Portrait of P.L. No. 1 (Oil on canvas, 198 cm × 142 cm (78 in × 56 in), Private Collection)
- Study for Portrait of P.L. No. 2 (Oil on canvas, 152.5 cm × 119.5 cm (60.0 in × 47.0 in), Robert and Lisa Sainsbury)
- Mlle Suzy Solidor (Oil on canvas, 76 cm × 61 cm (30 in × 24 in), Whereabouts Unknown, destroyed by the artist)
- Study for Portrait (Oil on canvas, 152.5 cm × 116.5 cm (60.0 in × 45.9 in), The Lambrecht-Schadeberg Collection / Winners of the Rubens Prize of the City of Siegen, permanent loan in the Museum für Gegenwartskunst Siegen, Siegen)
- Landscape after Van Gogh (Oil on canvas, 127 cm × 101.6 cm (50.0 in × 40.0 in), The Lambrecht-Schadeberg Collection / Winners of the Rubens Prize of the City of Siegen, permanent loan in the Museum für Gegenwartskunst Siegen, Siegen)
- Figure in Sea (Oil on canvas, 198 cm × 136.5 cm (78.0 in × 53.7 in), Private Collection)
- Two Owls (Oil on canvas, 152.4 cm × 117 cm (60.0 in × 46.1 in), Private Collection)
- Seated Man (Oil on canvas, 140 cm × 110 cm (55 in × 43 in), Private Collection)

1958

- Self-Portrait (Oil on canvas, 152.1 cm × 119.3 cm (59.9 in × 47.0 in), Hirshhorn Museum and Sculpture Garden, Smithsonian Institution, Washington, D.C.)
- Painting (Oil on canvas, 198 cm × 142 cm (78 in × 56 in), Musées Royaux des Beaux-Arts de Belgique, Brussels)
- Head I (Oil on canvas, 61 cm × 51 cm (24 in × 20 in), Private Collection)
- Head II (Oil on canvas, 61 cm × 51 cm (24 in × 20 in), European Institution Collection)
- Seated Man, Orange Background (Oil and sand on canvas, 155 cm × 141 cm (61 in × 56 in), Private Collection)
- Lying Figure (Oil on canvas, 153.5 cm × 119.5 cm (60.4 in × 47.0 in), Kunstmuseum Bochum, Bochum)
- Pope (Oil on canvas, 196 cm × 140 cm (77 in × 55 in), Brooklyn Museum, New York)
- Pope (Oil on canvas, 198.5 cm × 142 cm (78.1 in × 55.9 in), Private Collection)
- Pope with Owls (Oil on canvas, 145 cm × 109 cm (57 in × 43 in), Private Collection)
- Figure on a Dais (Oil on canvas, 190 cm × 140 cm (75 in × 55 in), Private Collection)
- Figure in a Room (Oil and sand on canvas, 198 cm × 142.2 cm (78.0 in × 56.0 in), Private Collection)

1959

- Reclining Figure (Oil on canvas, 198 cm × 142.2 cm (78.0 in × 56.0 in), Private Collection)
- Lying Figure (Oil on canvas, 198 cm × 141.5 cm (78.0 in × 55.7 in), New Walk Museum and Art Gallery, Leicester)
- Two Figures in a Room (Oil and sand on canvas, 198 cm × 141.5 cm (78.0 in × 55.7 in), Sainsbury Centre for Visual Arts, Norwich)
- Seated Figure on a Couch (Oil on canvas, 198 cm × 141.5 cm (78.0 in × 55.7 in), Private Collection)
- Reclining Figure (Oil on canvas, 198 cm × 142 cm (78 in × 56 in), Private Collection)
- Lying Figure (Oil on canvas, 198 cm × 142 cm (78 in × 56 in), Kunstsammlung Nordrhein-Westfalen, Düsseldorf)
- Head of a Man (Oil on canvas, 34.5 cm × 30.5 cm (13.6 in × 12.0 in), Private Collection, Connecticut)
- Lying Figure (Oil on canvas, 198 cm × 113 cm (78 in × 44 in), Private Collection, USA)
- Sleeping Figure (Oil on canvas, 119.5 cm × 152.5 cm (47.0 in × 60.0 in), Private Collection)
- Study from Portrait of Pope Innocent X by Velásquez (Oil on canvas, 152.5 cm × 119.5 cm (60.0 in × 47.0 in), Private Collection)
- Head of a Man (Oil on canvas, 48.25 × 45.75 cm, Private Collection)
- Head of Man (Oil on canvas, 34.5 cm × 28 cm (13.6 in × 11.0 in), Private Collection)
- Miss Muriel Belcher (Oil on canvas, 74 cm × 67.5 cm (29.1 in × 26.6 in), Private Collection)
- Head of Man - Study of Drawing by Van Gogh (Oil on canvas, 66 cm × 61 cm (26 in × 24 in), Private Collection)
- Two Figures (Oil on canvas, 134.5 cm × 91.5 cm (53.0 in × 36.0 in), Private Collection)
- Figure (Oil on hardboard, upper: 75.7 cm × 119 cm (29.8 in × 46.9 in); lower: 76.9 cm × 119.2 cm (30.3 in × 46.9 in), Private Collection)

== 1960s ==
1959–60

- Walking Figure (Oil on canvas, 158.12 × 142.24 cm, Dallas Museum of Art, Dallas)

1960

- Nude (Oil on canvas 152,4 x 119,7 cm, Museum für Moderne Kunst Frankfurt, Frankfurt)
- Seated Figure (Oil on canvas, 153 cm × 119 cm (60 1/8 in × 47 in), Private collection)
- Study of a Child (Oil on canvas 152.5 cm × 118 cm (60.0 in × 46.5 in), Botero Museum, Bogotá)

1961

- Reclining Woman (Oil on canvas, 198.8 cm × 141.6 cm (78.3 in × 55.7 in), Tate Gallery, London)
- Seated Figure (Oil on canvas, 165.1 cm × 142.2 cm (65.0 in × 56.0 in), Tate Gallery, London)

1962

- Figure in a Room (Oil on canvas, 198.8 cm × 144.7 cm (78.3 in × 57.0 in), Leeum, Samsung Museum of Art, Seoul)
- Study for Three Heads (Oil on canvas, 35.9 cm × 30.8 cm (14.1 in × 12.1 in), Museum of Modern Art, New York City)
- Three Studies for a Crucifixion (Oil and sand on canvas, 200 cm × 140 cm (78 in × 57 in), Solomon R. Guggenheim Museum, New York City) (large triptych)

1963

- Figure with Two Owls, Study for Velazquez (Oil on canvas, 198.12 x 144.78 cm, San Francisco Museum of Modern Art, San Francisco)
- Portrait of Henrietta Moraes (Oil on canvas, 165.1 cm × 142.2 cm (65.0 in × 56.0 in),Sheldon Solow)
- Study for Portrait on Folding Bed (Oil on canvas, 198.1 cm × 147.3 cm (78.0 in × 58.0 in), Tate Gallery, London)
- Study for Self Portrait (Oil on canvas, 165.2 cm × 142.6 cm (65.0 in × 56.1 in), National Museum Cardiff, Cardiff)
- Three Studies for the Portrait of Henrietta Moraes (Oil on canvas, each 36 cm × 31 cm (14 1/8 in × 12 1/8 in)), Museum of Modern Art, New York City) (small triptych)

1964

- Study for the Portrait of Lucian Freud (Oil on canvas, 198 cm × 147.8 cm (78.0 in × 58.2 in), Israel Museum, Jerusalem)
- Three Figures in a Room 1964 (Oil on canvas, 198 cm × 147.5 cm (78.0 in × 58.1 in), Musée National d'Art Moderne, Centre Georges Pompidou, Paris) (large triptych)
- Study for Self-Portrait (Oil on canvas, 152.4 cm × 140 cm (60.0 in × 55.1 in), Private collection)
- Three Studies for George Dyer

1965

- Crucifixion (Oil and acrylic on canvas, 197.5 cm × 147 cm (77.8 in × 57.9 in), Pinakothek der Moderne, Munich) (large triptych)

1966

- Three Studies for a Portrait of Lucian Freud (Oil on canvas, 198 cm × 147.5 cm (78.0 in × 58.1 in), Private collection) (large triptych)
- Portrait of George Dyer Talking (Oil on canvas, 198.2 cm × 147.3 cm (78.0 in × 58.0 in), Private collection)
- Portrait of Isabel Rawsthorne (Oil on canvas, 81.3 cm × 68.6 cm (32.0 in × 27.0 in), Tate Gallery, London)

c.1967

- Untitled (Head) (Oil on canvas, 33.5 cm × 30.5 cm (13.2 in × 12.0 in), Private collection)

1967

- Study for Head of Lucian Freud (Oil on canvas, 36 cm × 30.5 cm (14.2 in × 12.0 in), Private collection, long term loan to Tate Gallery, London)
- Triptych inspired by T.S Elliot's Poem Sweeney Agonistes (Oil and pastel on canvas, 198 cm × 147.5 cm (78.0 in × 58.1 in), Hirshhorn Museum and Sculpture Garden, Washington, D.C.) (large triptych)
- Portrait of George Dyer and Lucian Freud (1967)

1968

- Two Figures Lying on a Bed with Attendants (Oil and pastel on canvas, 198 cm × 147.5 cm (78.0 in × 58.1 in), Tehran Museum of Contemporary Art, Tehran) (large triptych)

1969

- Three Studies of Lucian Freud (Oil on canvas, 198 cm × 147.5 cm (78.0 in × 58.1 in), Private collection) (large triptych)

== 1970s ==
1970

- Triptych 1970 (Oil on canvas, 198 cm × 147.5 cm (78.0 in × 58.1 in), National Gallery of Australia, Canberra) (large triptych)
- Three Studies of the Male Back (Oil on canvas, 198 cm × 147.5 cm (78.0 in × 58.1 in), Kunsthaus, Zurich)
- Triptych – Studies of the Human Body (1970) (Oil on canvas, 198 cm × 147.5 cm (78.0 in × 58.1 in), Private collection of Jacques Hachuel, Paris) (large triptych)
- Triptych – Studies from the Human Body (1970) (Oil on canvas, 198 cm × 147.5 cm (78.0 in × 58.1 in), Private collection of Jacques Hachuel, Paris) (large triptych)

1971

- Study of Red Pope 1962. 2nd version 1971 198 cm × 148 cm (78 in × 58 1/8 in)
- In Memory of George Dyer (Oil on canvas, 198 cm × 147.5 cm (78.0 in × 58.1 in), Beyler Foundation, Riehen, near Basel) (large triptych)

1972

- Triptych–August 1972 (Oil on canvas, 198.1 cm × 147.3 cm (78.0 in × 58.0 in), Tate Gallery, London)
- Three Studies of Figures on Beds (Oil and tempere on canvas, 198 cm × 147.5 cm (78.0 in × 58.1 in), Private collection) (large triptych)

1973

- Three Portraits: Posthumous Portrait of George Dyer, Self-portrait, and Portrait of Lucian Freud (Oil on canvas, 198 cm × 147.5 cm (78.0 in × 58.1 in), Beyler Foundation, Riehen, near Basel) (large triptych)
- Triptych, May–June 1973 (Oil on canvas, 198 cm × 147.5 cm (78.0 in × 58.1 in), Private collection of Esther Grether, Switzerland) (large triptych)

1974

- Three Studies for Self-Portrait (Oil on canvas, 35.6 cm × 30.5 cm (14.0 in × 12.0 in), Private collection) (small triptych)
- Triptych March 1974 (Oil on canvas, 198 cm × 147.5 cm (78.0 in × 58.1 in), Private collection, Madrid) (large triptych)
- Triptych 1974–1977 (Oil and pastel on canvas, 198 cm × 147.5 cm (78.0 in × 58.1 in), Private collection of Joe Lewis) (large triptych)

1975

- Three Studies for Self-Portrait (Oil on canvas, each 35.5 cm × 30.5 cm (14.0 in × 12.0 in), Private collection) (small triptych)
- Three Figures and Portrait (Oil on canvas, 198.1 cm × 147.3 cm (78.0 in × 58.0 in), Tate Gallery, London)

1976

- Study for Self-Portrait (Oil on canvas, 198.0 cm × 147.5 cm (78.0 in × 58.1 in), Art Gallery of New South Wales, Sydney)
- Triptych 1976 (Oil on canvas, 198 cm × 147.5 cm (78.0 in × 58.1 in), Private collection of Roman Abramovich) (large triptych)

1979

- Triptych – Studies of the Human Body (1979) (Oil on canvas, 198 cm × 147.5 cm (78.0 in × 58.1 in), Private collection) (large triptych)

1979–80

- Three Studies for a Self-Portrait (Oil on canvas, each 37 cm × 32 cm (14 3/4 in × 12 1/2 in), Metropolitan Museum of Art, New York City) (small triptych)

== 1980s ==
1981

- Triptych inspired by the Oresteia of Aeschylus (Oil on canvas, 198 cm × 147.5 cm (78.0 in × 58.1 in), Astrup Fearnley Museum of Modern Art, Oslo) (large triptych)

1981–82

- Triptych November 1981 – January 1982 (left panel) (Oil, pastel and transfer lettering on canvas, 198 cm × 147.5 cm (78.0 in × 58.1 in), Private collection, the Estate of Francis Bacon)

1982

- Three Studies for Portrait (Mick Jagger) (Oil and pastel on canvas, each panel 35.5 cm × 30.5 cm (14.0 in × 12.0 in), Private collection, New York City) (small triptych)

1983

- Three Studies for a Self Portrait (Oil on canvas, 35 cm × 30 cm (13 3/4 in × 12 in), Honolulu Museum of Art, Honolulu)
- Triptych 1983 (Oil and pastel on canvas, 198 cm × 147.5 cm (78.0 in × 58.1 in), Private collection of Juan Abelló) (large triptych)

1984

- Three Studies for a Portrait of John Edwards (Oil on canvas, 198 cm × 147.5 cm (78.0 in × 58.1 in), Private collection) (large triptych)

1986

- Study for a Self-Portrait—Triptych, 1985–86 (Oil on canvas, 198 cm × 147.5 cm (78.0 in × 58.1 in), Marlborough International Fine Art) (large triptych)
- Portrait of Gilbert de Botton Speaking (Oil on canvas, Private collection)

1987

- Triptych 86–87 (Oil on canvas, 198 cm × 147.5 cm (78.0 in × 58.1 in), Private collection) (large triptych)
- Triptych 1987 (Oil on canvas, 198 cm × 147.5 cm (78.0 in × 58.1 in), Private collection of the Estate of Francis Bacon, London) (large triptych)

c.1988

- Blood on Pavement (Oil on canvas, 198 cm × 147.5 cm (78.0 in × 58.1 in), Private collection)

1988

- Portrait of John Edwards (Oil on canvas, 198 cm × 147.5 cm (78.0 in × 58.1 in), Private collection of the Estate of Francis Bacon, London)
- Jet of Water (Oil on canvas, 198 cm × 147.5 cm (78.0 in × 58.1 in), Private collection of Mr. and Mrs. J. Tomlinson Hill, New York)
- Second Version of Triptych 1944 (Oil on canvas, 198 cm × 147.5 cm (78.0 in × 58.1 in), Tate, London) (large triptych)

== 1990s ==
1991

- Study for a Portrait March 1991 (Oil on canvas, 198 cm × 147.5 cm (78.0 in × 58.1 in), Scottish National Gallery of Modern Art, Edinburgh)
- Triptych 1991 (Oil on linen, 198.1 cm × 147.6 cm (78.0 in × 58.1 in), Museum of Modern Art, New York City) (large triptych)

== See also ==
- List of large triptychs by Francis Bacon

== Sources ==
- Gale, Matthew; Stevens, Chris (2009). Francis Bacon. London: Tate. ISBN 978-1-85-437824-8.
- "The Official Website of the Estate of Francis Bacon-Paintings". The Official Website of the Estate of Francis Bacon.
