= Nehemiah Dyer =

American naval officer (1839–1910)

Nehemiah Mayo Dyer
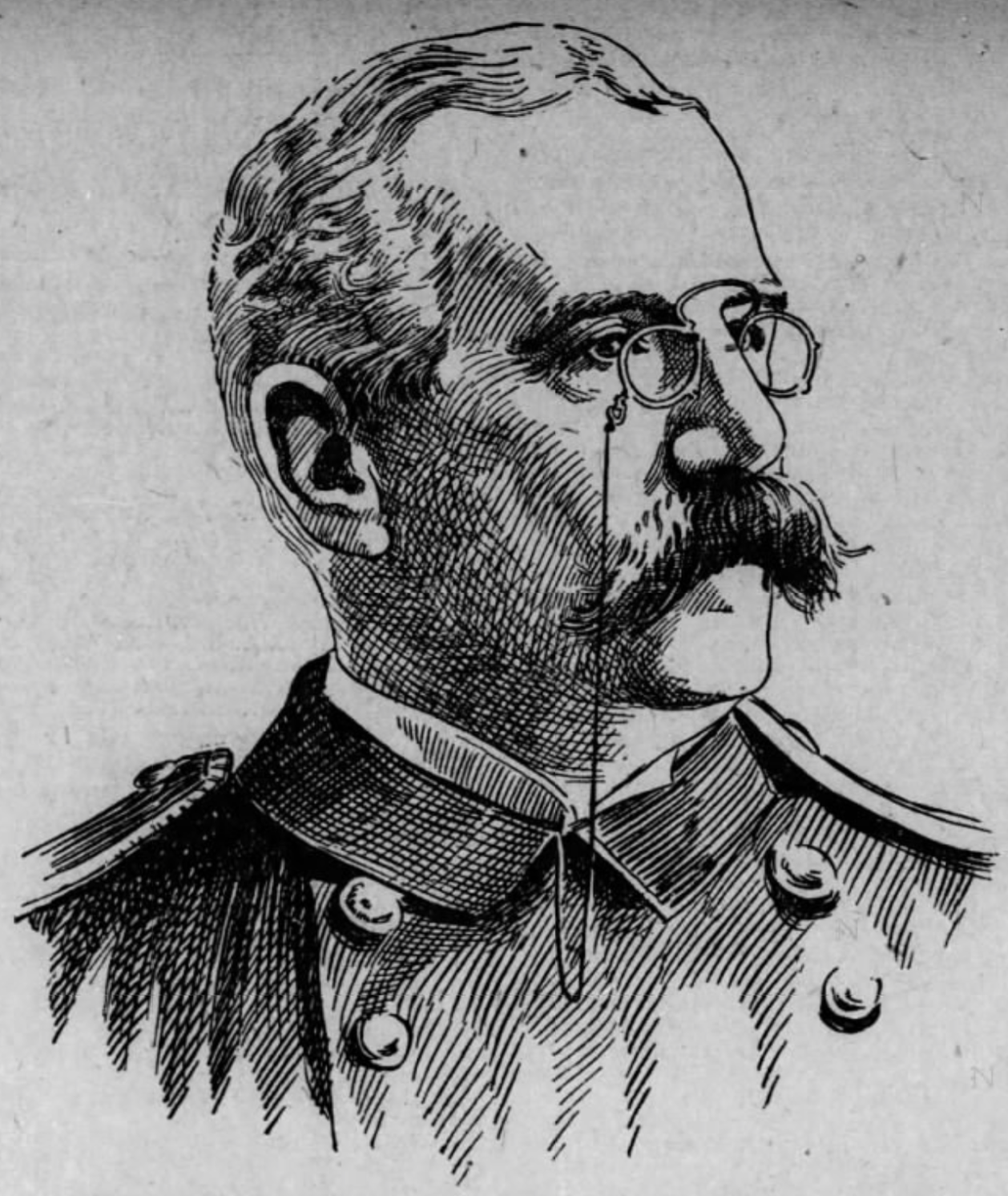
- Sketch of Dyer, c. 1901
- Born: February 19, 1839; Provincetown, Massachusetts, U.S.
- Died: January 27, 1910 (aged 70); Melrose, Massachusetts, U.S.
- Burial place: Wyoming Cemetery; Melrose, Massachusetts, U.S.
- Military career
- Allegiance: United States
- Branch: United States Navy
- Service years: 1862–1901
- Rank: Rear admiral
- Conflicts: American Civil War; Battle of Mobile Bay; Spanish–American War; Battle of Manila Bay

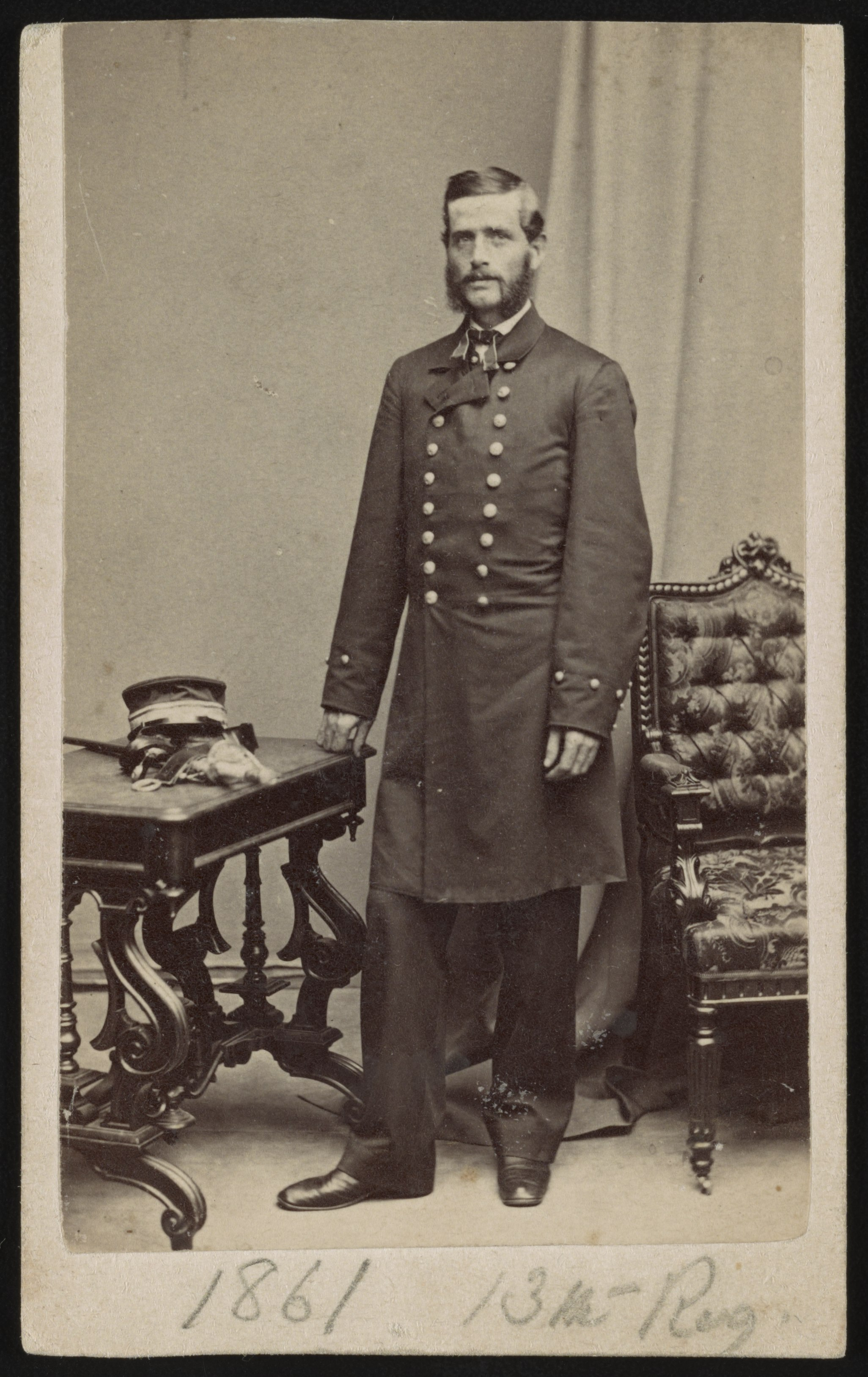
Master's Mate Nehemiah Mayo Dyer of U.S. Navy in uniform (1860s)

Nehemiah Mayo Dyer (aka. N. Mayo Dyer; February 19, 1839 – January 27, 1910) was a rear admiral in United States Navy, who served during the American Civil War and Spanish–American War. He was one of the few individuals to have served in both the Battle of Mobile Bay during the Civil War and the Battle of Manila Bay during the Spanish–American War.

== Biography ==
Nehemiah Mayo Dyer was born in Provincetown, Massachusetts, to Henry and Sally (Mayo) Dyer. He was educated in the public schools. He "followed the sea" from 1854 to 1859. He had mercantile employment from 1859 to 1861.

== Civil War service ==
With the outbreak of the American Civil War, he enlisted 13th Massachusetts Volunteer Infantry Regiment in July 1861. He transferred to the Volunteer Navy as an acting master's mate on April 4, 1862. He served at the Boston Navy Yard from 1862 to 1863; the USS Eugenie from 1863 to 1864. He was promoted for gallant services to acting ensign on May 18, 1863.

He was assigned to the USS Metacomet in 1864 as part of the West Gulf Blockading Squadron under Rear Admiral David Farragut.

On June 30, 1864, Mayo, in command of the USS Glasgow, forced blockade-running steamer Ivanhoe to run aground near Fort Morgan at Mobile Bay. Because the steamer was protected by the fort's guns, Rear Admiral Farragut attempted at first to destroy her by long-range fire from the Metacomet and the USS Monongahela. When this proved unsuccessful, Farragut authorized his flag lieutenant, J. Crittenden Watson, to lead a boat expedition to burn Ivanhoe. Under the cover of darkness and the ready guns on board USS Metacomet and the USS Kennebec, Watson led four boats directly to the grounded steamer and fired her in two places shortly after midnight July 6.

Mayo was promoted to acting master for gallant service aboard USS Metacomet during the Battle of Mobile Bay, August 4–5, 1864.

After the war, he joined the Massachusetts Commandery of the Military Order of the Loyal Legion of the United States and was assigned insignia number 8854.

== Post–Civil War career ==
In April 1866, he was ordered to report to the Bureau of Navigation in Washington and remained there on special duty until May 1868. On March 12, 1868, he was promoted to lieutenant, and on August 27, joined the USS Dacotah at Valparaiso, Chile. He was promoted to lieutenant-commander on December 28, 1868, and from September 1869, to March 1870, commanded the USS Cyane at Sitka, Alaska. He then joined the USS Pensacola at San Francisco, and was soon transferred to the USS Ossipee, with which he cruised to lower California and Mexico. He received a medal from the Massachusetts humane society for saving the life of a sailor by jumping overboard from the Ossipee during a gale in the Pacific Ocean.

In September 1870, he was ordered to the South Pacific station and was sent home on August 22, 1871. In October 1871, he was assigned to the Charlestown Navy Yard. He took command of the dispatch boat USS Mayflower at Norfolk, Virginia, on November 24, 1873, and on April 10, 1874, was transferred to the USS Pinta. In February 1876, he was ordered as executive officer of the USS New Hampshire, fitting out at Norfolk, to be the permanent flagship at Port Royal. A few months later he was assigned to equipment duty at the Charlestown Navy Yard, and in 1879 was transferred to the receiving ship USS Wabash. In 1881 he joined the USS Tennessee, in 1883 became lighthouse inspector, and in the same year was promoted to the rank of commander. He commanded the USS Marion on the Asiatic station from 1887 to 1890.

He then served at the Portsmouth Navy Yard from 1890 to 1893 and was on special duty from 1893 to 1894. He returned to the Boston Navy Yard from 1895 to 1896 and served as light-house inspector for the 1st District at Portland, Maine, from 1896 to 1897.

He was promoted to the rank of captain on July 13, 1897, and assigned to command the cruiser USS Philadelphia in the Pacific squadron. He was at Mare Island, California on August 31, 1897, when he was ordered to the command of the cruiser USS Baltimore, with which ship he went to Honolulu and thence to Hong Kong, China where the Baltimore became part of the Asiatic Squadron under Commodore George Dewey.

He commanded the Baltimore at the Battle of Manila Bay on May 1, 1898. For eminent and conspicuous conduct in this battle he was advanced seven numbers in rank, which allowed him to be promoted sooner than he would have otherwise. For his service at Manila Bay, the Baltimore city council presented him an elaborate sword.

His final assignment was as second in command of the Boston Navy Yard, under Rear Admiral William T. Sampson, from February 1900. He reached the mandatory retirement age of 62 on February 19, 1901, and was retired in the rank of rear admiral in recognition of his service during the Civil War.

In retirement, he served as chairman of the board of commissioners of the Massachusetts Nautical Training School (forerunner of the Massachusetts Maritime Academy) from 1903 to 1904.

Rear Admiral Dyer died in Melrose, Massachusetts, on January 27, 1910. He is buried in the Wyoming Cemetery in Melrose, Massachusetts.

Admiral Dyer was one of the very few individuals who served with Admiral Farragut at the Battle of Mobile Bay and also with Commodore Dewey at the Battle of Manila Bay.

== Awards ==
Admiral Dyer received the Civil War Campaign Medal, Battle of Manila Bay Commemorative Medal (the "Dewey Medal") and the Spanish Campaign Medal.

- Civil War Campaign Medal
- Battle of Manila Bay Medal
- Spanish Campaign Medal

== Dates of rank ==
- Mate - 4 April 1862
- Acting Master - 12 January 1864
- Acting Volunteer Lieutenant - 22 April 1865
- Lieutenant - 12 March 1868
- Lieutenant Commander - 18 December 1868
- Commander - 23 April 1883
- Captain - 13 July 1897
- Rear Admiral, Retired - 19 February 1901

== Namesake ==
The destroyer USS Dyer (DD-84) was named in his honor.
