= Portrait of George Dyer and Lucian Freud =

1967 painting by Francis Bacon

Portrait of George Dyer and Lucian Freud, 1967. Oil on canvas, 78 x 58 in. Destroyed.

Portrait of George Dyer and Lucian Freud was a 1967 oil-on-canvas painting by the Irish-born artist Francis Bacon, which he destroyed before it could leave his studio, though it was photographed and is highly regarded by art critics. Bacon was a ruthless self critic, and often abandoned paintings mid-work, or slashed finished canvases; something he often later regretted.

The painting is the first to show his lover George Dyer clothed, wearing a jacket, shirt and tie. He is shown in a frenetic manner, full of life, confidence and panache, with his head turning from side to side as he addresses company. The portrait is one of the few to show Dyer as people other than Bacon might have seen him in his prime; charming, engaging and physically attractive. In contrast, Lucian Freud is a ball of tension, his hands tightly gripped and placed on his leg. Both men are set in what appears to be a pub, and before heavy green curtains reminiscent of those in Bacon's studio. The linear curtain folds resemble those in Bacon's famed pope series of the 1950s.

== See also ==
- List of paintings by Francis Bacon

== Sources ==
- Dawson, Barbara; Sylvester, David. Francis Bacon in Dublin. London: Thames & Hunson, 2000. ISBN 0-500-28254-4
- Farr, Dennis; Peppiatt, Michael; Yard, Sally. Francis Bacon: A Retrospective. NY: Harry N Abrams, 1999. ISBN 0-8109-2925-2
- Peppiatt, Michael. Anatomy of an Enigma. Westview Press, 1996. ISBN 0-8133-3520-5
- Russell, John, Francis Bacon (World of Art). London: Norton, 1971. ISBN 0-500-20169-2
- Zweite, Armin (ed). The Violence of the Real. London: Thames and Hudson, 2006. ISBN 0-500-09335-0
