= Louis Dyer =

American educator and author (1851–1908)

Louis Dyer (1851–1908) was an American educator and writer born in Chicago in the U.S. state of Illinois. He graduated at Harvard University in 1874, and at Balliol College, Oxford, in 1878. He was assistant professor of Greek at Harvard (1881–1887), lecturer at Lowell Institute (1889) and at Balliol College, Oxford (1893–1896), and acting professor of Greek at Cornell University (1895–96). Dyer lectured before the Royal Institution in 1896 and in 1900 gave a series of lectures at the University of California which was repeated at many colleges and universities. He published a translation of Luigi Cossa's An Introduction to the Study of Political Economy (1893).

== Books ==
- The Greek Question and Answer (1884)
- Studies of the Gods in Greece (1891)
- Oxford as it is (1902)
- Machiavelli and the Modern State (1904)
- The Olympian Council House and Council (1908)
