= Portrait of George Dyer Talking =

Painting by Francis Bacon

- Artist: Francis Bacon
- Year: 1966
- Medium: Oil on canvas
- Dimensions: 200 cm × 150 cm (78 in × 58 in)
- Location: Private Collection

Portrait of George Dyer Talking is an oil painting on canvas executed in 1966 by the British painter Francis Bacon. It is a portrait of his lover George Dyer made at the height of Bacon's creative power. It depicts Dyer sitting on a revolving office stool in a luridly coloured room. His body and face are contorted, and his legs are tightly crossed. His head appears to be framed within a window or door. Above him is a naked hanging lightbulb, a favourite motif of Bacon's. The work contains a number of spatial ambiguities, not least that Dyer's body seems to be positioned both in the fore- and background.

The painting was sold at Christie's, London, on 13 February 2014, realizing £42,194,500. The seller was reported by Bloomberg to be Mexican financier David Martínez Guzmán, said to have purchased the painting in a private sale for $12,000,000 some five years before.

== Description ==
Detail of face

The painting is formed by sweeping curves, which characterise both the description of his body and the space he occupies. He is painted in a very compact and tense manner; his hands are tightly clasped, rendered in whites and pinks, his broad and muscular neck is painted in wide brush strokes. The formation of his legs, tightly wrapped around each other, is barely distinct. Discarded documents are scattered around his feet. The painting closely resembles the 1966 Portrait of George Dyer Staring at a Blind Cord, in that both feature a hanging cord, and both works are almost Cubist in their rendering of his face.

== Death of George Dyer ==
George Dyer died by suicide on 24 October 1971, two days before the opening of Bacon's triumphant and career-making retrospective at the Grand Palais. Dyer, then 37, alcoholic, deeply insecure and suffering severe and long-term depression, took an overdose of drink and barbiturates in a room at the Paris hotel shared with Bacon during a brief period of reconciliation following years of bitter recrimination.

Bacon, a near-alcoholic himself, felt an acute sense of mortality and awareness of the fragility of life after his lover's death. This awareness was heightened by the death of many other close friends during the following decade. The commemorative portraits of Dyer completed in the following years are considered amongst Bacon's strongest and most affecting. In most, especially in the triptychs, Dyer is followed by black horizontal fleshy winged creatures, raw and red/pink blobs of dying flesh, or painterly arrows. These devices act both as pointers to the depravity and tragedy of the scene and as manifestations of Bacon's guilt at the death of an emotionally dependent friend.

== Provenance ==
- Marlborough Fine Art Ltd., London.
- Galerie Maeght, Paris.
- Dr. Israel J. Rosefsky, Binghamton, New York.
- Sale, Christie's, New York, 5 May 1987, lot 85.
- Galerie Krugier & Cie, Geneva.
- ROC Collection, Switzerland.
- Private Collection, Paris.
- Anon. sale, Christie's New York, 15 November 2000, lot 29.
- Private Collection, Brazil.
- Thomas Ammann Fine Art AG, Zurich.
- Private Collection.
- Sale, Christie's, London, 14 February 2014, lot 10.

== See also ==
- List of most expensive paintings
- List of paintings by Francis Bacon
