= Luigi Cossa =

Italian economist

Luigi Cossa (May 27, 1831 – May 10, 1896), Italian economist, was born in Milan.

== Life ==
Educated at the universities of Pavia, Vienna and Leipzig, he was appointed professor of political economy at Pavia in 1858. Apart from this Cossa was the author of several other works which established him a high reputation.

== Major works ==
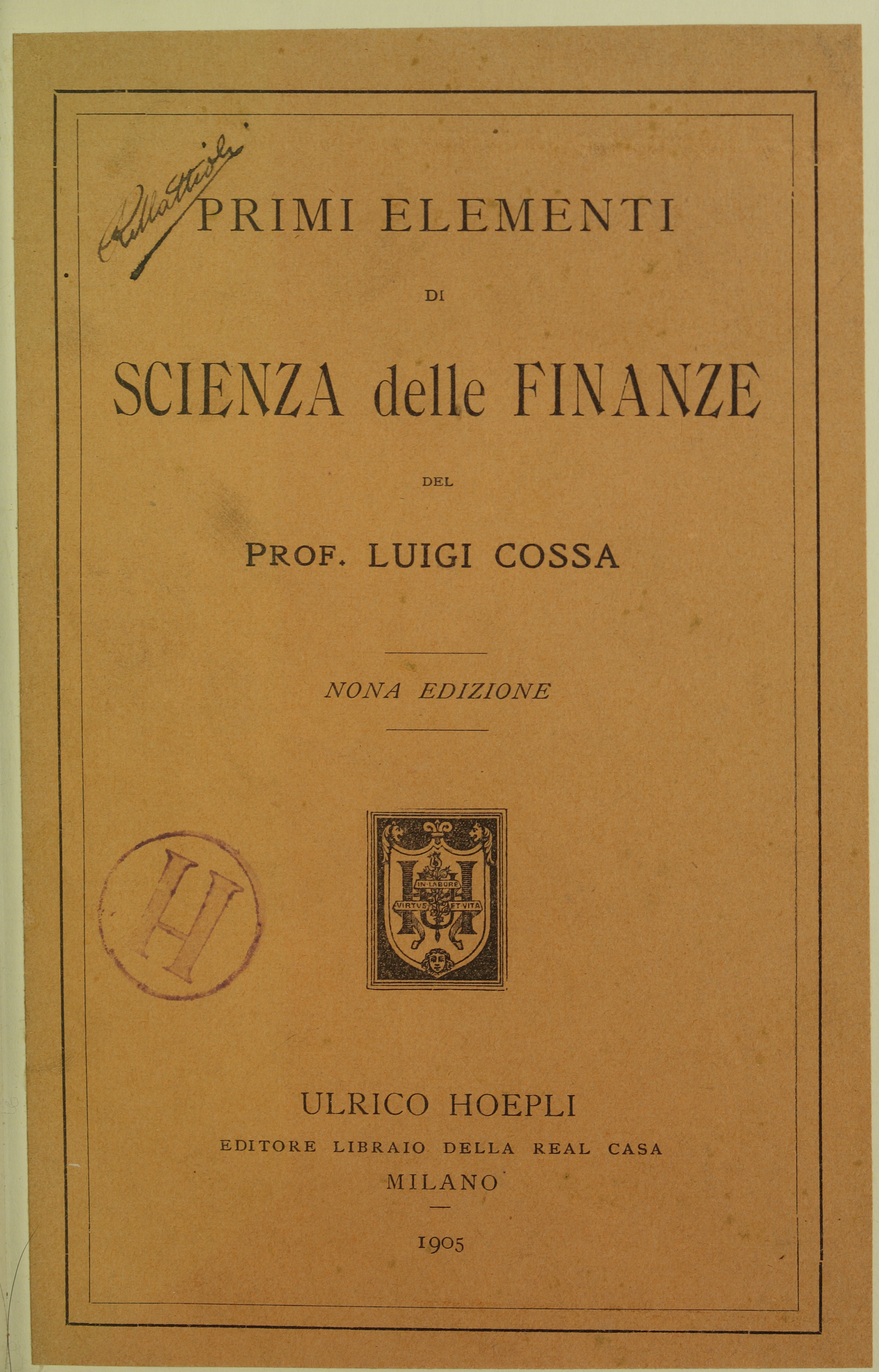
Primi elementi di scienza delle finanze, 1905

- Scienza delle Finanze (1875, English translation 1888: Taxation, its Principles and Methods, with an introduction and notes by White, Horace)
- Guida allo studio dell economia politica (1876, English translation 1880: Guide to the Study of Political Economy, with an introduction by Stanley Jevons), a compendium of the theoretical preliminaries of economics, with a brief critical history of the science and an extensive bibliography
- Introduzione allo studio deli economia politica (1876, English translation by Louis Dyer, 1893: An Introduction to the Study of Political Economy). It has been described as a more complete, updated version of the Guide to the Study of Political Economy.
- Saggi di economia politica, 1878.

== Sources ==
- Blaug, Mark, ed. (1986). "COSSA, Luigi". Who's Who in Economics: A Biographical Dictionary of Major Economists 1700-1986 (2nd ed.). Wheatsheaf Books Limited. p. 184 – via Internet Archive.
