= Head V =

1949 painting by Francis Bacon

- Artist: Francis Bacon
- Year: 1949
- Medium: Oil on canvas
- Dimensions: 82 cm × 66 cm (32 in × 26 in)
- Location: Private collection

Head V is an oil on canvas painting by Irish-born British artist Francis Bacon, from 1949. It is held in a private collection.

== History and description ==
It is one of the series of works made in 1949 for his first one-man exhibition at the Hanover Gallery, in London. The painting is part of a series of six works from the late 1940s depicting heads. Like Head II, the work depicts a distorted head shrouded with vertical bands interpreted as curtains, with several safety pins in the curtains.

Bacon's six Head paintings were first exhibited at the Hanover Gallery in 1949, alongside four other important early works by Bacon: Three Studies for Figures at the Base of a Crucifixion, Figure in a landscape, Study from the Human Body (also known as Study for Figure) and Study for Portrait (also known as Man in a Blue Box). It has been described as one of the most elusive images produced by Bacon and also as the most abstract or indistinct picture of the series. It has not been exhibited since 1958, and was owned by a private collector in Switzerland in 1964.

== See also ==
- List of paintings by Francis Bacon

== Sources ==
- Dawson, Barbara; Sylvester, David. Francis Bacon in Dublin. London: Thames & Hudson, 2000. ISBN 978-0-500-28254-0
- Farr, Dennis; Peppiatt, Michael; Yard, Sally. Francis Bacon: A Retrospective. NY: Harry N Abrams, 1999. ISBN 978-0-8109-2925-8
- Peppiatt, Michael. Anatomy of an Enigma. London: Westview Press, 1996. ISBN 978-0-8133-3520-9
- Russell, John. Francis Bacon (World of Art). NY: Norton, 1971. ISBN 978-0-500-20169-5
