= Three Studies for George Dyer =

Painting by Francis Bacon

- Artist: Francis Bacon
- Year: 1964
- Medium: Oil on canvas
- Dimensions: 35.5 cm × 30 cm (14.0 in × 12 in)
- Location: Private collection

Three Studies for George Dyer is a small-format triptych painted by the Irish-born British artist Francis Bacon in 1964. It comprises three portraits of Bacon's lover George Dyer: from left to right, a three-quarter view, a right profile, and a face-on view. It was painted in the first half of 1964, within a year of Bacon first meeting Dyer in late 1963, and was based on photographs of Dyer taken by John Deakin. Bacon painted about 40 triptychs in this small format, with each portrait measuring 35.5 by 30 centimetres (14.0 in × 11.8 in). This is one of five of Dyer in the small format, the others completed in 1963, 1964 (on a pink ground), 1966 and 1969.

Unlike the four other small-format Dyer triptychs, one of which was painted on a pink ground and the others on a dark ground, this version was painted on a light yellowish ground. Bacon used heavy structural brushstrokes in a limited palette of red/orange, black, and white, with a touch of blue.

The painting was included in the Bacon retrospective held at the Grand Palais in Paris: Dyer committed suicide the evening before it opened in 1971. The triptych was held in a private collection from 1970 until it was sold at Sotheby's in London in June 2014 for £26.7m, including buyer's premium.

Sotheby's sold Francis Bacon's 1966 “Three Studies of George Dyer” for $38.6 million following a single telephone bid placed by a collector on 16 November 2017

== See also ==
- List of paintings by Francis Bacon
