= Mike Dyer (sportswriter) =

Michael Jeffrey Dyer (March 8, 1939 in New York City), is a retired sportswriter who wrote for the Albany Times Union (1963–66), Long Island Press (1966–77), Times Herald-Record (1977–85), Schenectady Gazette (1985–1991) and Troy Record (1991–2009). He was a January 1963 graduate of Hofstra University, in Hempstead, Long Island.

Dyer covered the New York Mets and New York Yankees baseball teams for 19 years, from 1967 to 1986. During that time he wrote two books, Getting into Pro Baseball (Franklin Watts Publisher, 1976) and Pro Football's Greatest Teams (Tempo Books, 1980), in addition to numerous magazine articles. He was the editor of Who's Who in Baseball, 1984. He died June 27 2020 in Sun City, Florida
