= George Dyer (politician) =

American physician and politician

George Dyer (August, 1802 - May 8, 1878) was an American medical doctor and politician.

Dyer was born in Windham, Connecticut, in August, 1802. He was the son of Benjamin Dyer, a druggist in Windham and the grandson of Eliphalet Dyer, a member of Congress from Connecticut and afterwards Chief Justice of the State.

He began the study of medicine with Chester Hunt, of Windham, and after earning a degree from Yale Medical School in 1827 established himself in practice in Greenfield Hill, Connecticut. After not finding a good opening there he moved in about 1832 to Trumbull, Connecticut, where he continued in active medical practice for forty years. He was attacked about five years before his death with softening of the brain, and failed gradually in mental and physical strength. He took an interest in local politics, and once represented Trumbull in the Connecticut State Legislature. He died in Trumbull, Connecticut, May 8, 1878, aged 75 years. He married when about 60 years of age, and his wife survived him without children.

This article incorporates public domain material from the Yale Obituary Record.
