= Charles A. Dyer =

American child rapist

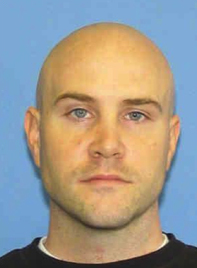
Mug shot of Charles Dyer

Charles Alan Dyer (born August 17, 1980) is an American convicted child rapist and a former Marine sergeant who operated as an advocate for the Oath Keepers. Dyer was charged in 2010 with child rape and illegal weapons possession. Dyer evaded authorities and a manhunt ensued, followed by capture ten days later. In 2012, Dyer was convicted of raping his seven-year-old daughter. Dyer served in the Marine Corps during the Iraq War.

== Oath Keeper involvement ==
Dyer began producing YouTube videos in support of the Oath Keepers under the handle July4Patriot. Dyer at times recorded these videos in Marine Corps dress uniform and always wore a mask emblazoned with a grinning skull. Dyer said he wore the mask to protect his identity. Dyer claimed that military urban warfare drills had the covert purpose of preparing American soldiers to incarcerate citizens. Dyer's videos became viral in the Patriot and Oath Keeper subculture, several accumulating hundreds of thousands of views and thousands of comments.

Dyer revealed his identity at an April 29, 2010, Tea Party event in Lexington, Massachusetts. He was among the most prominent Oath Keepers members at the time.

Following news of the alleged crimes, the Oath Keepers distanced themselves from Dyer. Oath Keepers founder Stewart Rhodes wrote on their website that Dyer had never been offered a leadership position and in fact had never been a member. The American Conservative notes that this attempt to sever ties was not very effective. The group removed a notice that Dyer would "represent" the Oath Keepers at a Tea Party movement rally. Though the Conservative disputes the account of Dyer's involvement as showing a problem with the Oath Keepers as an organization, it notes that "Dyer was clearly associated with Rhodes's group [the Oath Keepers]" and "if Dyer is guilty of the weapons charge, that might seem to support the position that the Oath Keeper worldview encourages insurrectionary force".

== Criminal charges ==
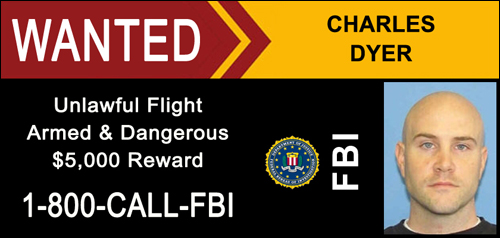
Billboard displayed across the southern United States during the Dyer manhunt in 2010

=== Initial charges ===
On January 21, 2010, Dyer was arrested by Stephens County sheriff deputies in his home in Marlow, Oklahoma. He was charged with rape and forced sodomy of his 7-year-old daughter. A search of his home revealed that he possessed a 40 mm grenade launcher and several firearms, resulting in an additional count of possession of an unregistered military weapon.

=== Manhunt ===
Prior to his August 15 court date, Dyer ran from the authorities, hiding in Texas until he was captured ten days later at a campground southwest of Houston. Given a video by Dyer telling authorities of his intent to arm himself if they appeared at his home, law enforcement was concerned about the possibility of violence in their pursuit. They found Dyer's mobile home burned when they arrived at his property, while his followers and friends posted videos describing their intent to help Dyer evade capture. Residents of Pecan Grove, Texas, notified authorities of a strange man near a day-care center, leading police to find Dyer. Dyer told police that he had been hiding in brush near a creek for five or six days.

=== Trial ===
Dyer was part of three trials, the first two of which were dismissed as mistrials in January 2010 and April 2011. He faced six charges, including kidnapping and second degree rape by instrumentation. In Dyer's third trial, the judge ordered that media and photography of the jury panel be prohibited.

In April 2012, Dyer was convicted of the rape of his daughter. He was sentenced to 30 years' imprisonment. The conviction followed two prior mistrials. Judge Joe Enos presided over the trial. Following the conviction, Stephens County Sheriff McKinney described the "circus-like sideshows" that Dyer brought to the courtroom, including statements on his political views and his idea that the "prosecution was a government conspiracy". The trial took three days, and the jury deliberated for three hours before producing the guilty verdict.
