= Figure in a Landscape =

1945 painting by Francis Bacon

- Artist: Francis Bacon
- Year: 1945
- Type: Oil on canvas
- Dimensions: 144.8 cm × 128.3 cm (57.0 in × 50.5 in)
- Location: Tate Modern, London

Figure in a Landscape is an oil on canvas painting by the British artist Francis Bacon, from 1945. It is held at the Tate Modern, in London.

== History and description ==
It was based on a photograph of his then lover, Eric Hall, dozing on a seat in Hyde Park, also the basis of another 1945 painting of the same name, which was bought by Diana Watson and later in 1950 by the Tate Gallery.

As is typical in Bacon's figures, the human form depicted here is incomplete and unusual: the figure's legs seem to disappear into thin air, while the head and torso are not even hinted at, leaving the impression that the man's jacket is empty. Only the figure's hands remain, a bluish hue, resting on the bench, the only sign of a real human being. The vegetation behind Hall is painted a gloomy gray, contrasting with a patch of bright blue sky above. A mouth can be discerned speaking to a microphone, which can be perceived as a comentary on the political situation at the time. Tate Modern website states: "The pastoral setting is therefore contrasted with the intimations of organised political violence, making this an early example of Bacon’s combination of aggression and everyday mundane reality."

== See also ==
- List of paintings by Francis Bacon

== Bibliography ==
- Farr, Dennis; Peppiatt, Michael; Yard, Sally. Francis Bacon: A Retrospective. NY: Harry N Abrams, 1999. ISBN 978-0-8109-2925-8
- Peppiatt, Michael. Anatomy of an Enigma. Westview Press, 1996. ISBN 978-0-8133-3520-9
- Peppiatt, Michael. Francis Bacon in the 1950s. Yale University Press, 2006. ISBN 978-0-300-12192-6
- Russell, John. Francis Bacon (World of Art). NY: Norton, 1971. ISBN 978-0-500-20169-5
- Schmied, Wieland. Francis Bacon: Commitment and Conflict. Munich: Prestel, 1996. ISBN 978-3-7913-1664-2
- Sylvester, David. Looking back at Francis Bacon. London: Thames and Hudson, 2000. ISBN 978-0-500-01994-8
