= George P. Dyer =

American football player and coach (1876–1948)

Biographical details
- Born: February 7, 1876; Montevideo, Uruguay
- Died: June 22, 1948 (aged 72); Santa Barbara County, California, U.S.

Playing career
- 1893–1894: Cornell

Coaching career (HC unless noted)
- 1896: Army

Head coaching record
- Overall: 3–2–1

George Palmer Dyer (February 7, 1876 – June 22, 1948) was an American college football player and coach. He served as the head football coach at the United States Military Academy in 1896, compiling a record of 3–2–1. Dyer played at Cornell University in 1893 and 1894. He later served in the United States Navy as a paymaster.

George married Dorothy Sturges Bell on 9 October 1901 aboard the U.S.S. Santee. They were divorced in Nevada in February 1940. He married Amelia Frances Goodrich Jarvie (born 30 June 1881 in Brooklyn, N.Y.), donor of the carillon at the Jerusalem International YMCA, on 21 September 1940 in Essex, Ma. They lived at Yellow Jacket Ranch in Calistoga, California, making trips to Hawaii and New Zealand until Amelia's death on 25 July 1945. He was buried at Arlington National Cemetery.

== Head coaching record ==
Year	Team	Overall	Conference	Standing	Bowl/playoffs
Army Cadets (Independent) (1896)
1896	Army	3–2–1			
Army:		3–2–1			
Total:		3–2–1			
