= T. F. Thiselton-Dyer =

British clergyman and writer (1848–1923)

The Reverend Thomas Firminger Thiselton-Dyer, MA, Oxon (25 July 1848 – 14 July 1923) was a son of William George Thiselton-Dyer, physician and of Catherine Jane, née Firminger. He was educated at King's College School and at Pembroke College, Oxford. He was successively curate of St John's Church, Fitzroy Square, curate of Holy Trinity Church, Kilburn, vicar of St Paul's Church, Penzance, secretary of the South American Missionary Society and rector of Bayfield, Holt, Norfolk.

Thiselton-Dyer wrote several popular non-fiction books, including British Customs: Past and Present, The Folk-lore of Plants, and Strange Pages from Family Papers, which was considered a masterpiece of popular historical writing.

== See also ==
- William Turner Thiselton-Dyer, brother
