= List of large triptychs by Francis Bacon =

The Irish-born British artist Francis Bacon (1909–1992) painted 28 known large triptychs between 1944 and 1985–86. He began working in the format in the mid-1940s with a number of smaller scale works before graduating to large examples in 1962. He followed the larger style for 30 years, although he painted a number of smaller scale triptychs of friend's heads, and after the death of his former lover George Dyer in 1971, the three acclaimed "Black Triptychs".

Bacon was a highly mannered artist and often became preoccupied with forms, themes, images and modes of expression that he would rework for sustained periods, often for six or seven-year periods. When asked about his tendency for sequential or repetitive paintings, he explained how, in his mind, images revealed themselves "in series. And I suppose I could go long beyond the triptych and do five or six together, but I find the triptych is a more balanced unit."

He told critics that his usual practice with triptychs was to begin with the left panel and work across. Typically he completed each frame before beginning the next. As the work as a whole progressed, he would sometimes return to an earlier panel to make revisions, though this practice was generally carried out late in the overall work's completion.

== List of large triptychs ==
Details

Three Studies for Figures at the Base of a Crucifixion
1944
Catalogue Raisonné Number 44-01
Oil and pastel on Sundeala board
94 cm × 74 cm (37 in × 29 in)
Tate, London
Based on the Eumenides—or Furies—of Aeschylus' The Oresteia, donated to the Tate in 1953 by Bacon's lover, Eric Hall. Bacon painted Second Version of Triptych 1944 in 1988.

Three Studies for a Crucifixion
1962
Catalogue Raisonné Number 62-04
Oil and sand on canvas
198.1 x 144.8cm (78 x 57 in)
Solomon R. Guggenheim Museum, New York City

Three Figures in a Room 1964
1964
Catalogue Raisonné Number 64-10
Oil on canvas
198 x 147cm (78 x 58 in)
Musée National d'Art Moderne, Centre Georges Pompidou, Paris
Has been described as Bacon's first "secular triptych".

Crucifixion (1965)
1965
Catalogue Raisonné Number 65-01
Oil on Canvas
197.2 cm × 147 cm (78 in × 58 in)
Bayerische Staatsgemäldesammlungen, Pinakothek der Moderne, Munich

Three Studies for a Portrait of Lucian Freud
1966
Catalogue Raisonné Number 66-05
Oil on canvas
198 x 147.5cm (78 x 57 in)
Private collection
The first of three large triptychs depicting Lucian Freud. Freud also appears in Three Studies of Lucian Freud (1969) and Three Portraits: Posthumous Portrait of George Dyer, Self-portrait, and Portrait of Lucian Freud (1973). Freud was also the subject of numerous smaller portraits by Bacon.

Triptych Inspired by T.S Elliot's Poem "Sweeney Agoniste"
1967
Catalogue Raisonné Number 67-16
Oil and pastel on canvas
198 x 147.5cm (78.25 x 57.25 in)
Hirshhorn Museum and Sculpture Garden, Washington, D.C.
Inspired by the poem Sweeney Agonistes by T. S. Eliot, first triptych to feature figures on a bed.

Two Figures Lying on a Bed with Attendants
1968
Catalogue Raisonné Number 68-08
Oil and pastel on canvas
198 x 147.5cm (78 x 57 in)
Tehran Museum of Contemporary Art, Tehran
Purchased in 1972 by Farah Pahlavi, the wife of the last Shah of Iran for the Tehran Museum of Contemporary Art. Remained in storage for nearly two decades before display at Tate Britain in 2004.

Three Studies of Lucian Freud
1969
Catalogue Raisonné Number 69-07
Oil on canvas
198 x 147.5cm (78 x 57 in)
Private collection, USA
The second of three large triptychs depicting Lucian Freud. Freud also appears in Three Studies for a Portrait of Lucian Freud (1966) and Three Portraits: Posthumous Portrait of George Dyer, Self-portrait, and Portrait of Lucian Freud (1973). Freud was also the subject of numerous smaller portraits by Bacon. Sold by Christie's in New York on 13 November 2013, at $142m (£89m), it became the most expensive artwork ever auctioned.

Triptych – Studies from the Human Body (1970)
1970
Catalogue Raisonné Number 70-04
Oil and Dry Transfer Lettering on Canvas
198 x 147.5cm (78 x 58 in)
The Esther Grether Family Collection, Basel

Three Studies of the Male Back
1970
Catalogue Raisonné Number 70-06
Oil on canvas
198 x 147.5cm (78 x 58 in)
Kunsthaus Zürich

Triptych – Studies of the Human Body (1970)
1970
Catalogue Raisonné Number 70-09
Oil on canvas
197 x 147.8cm (78 x 58.5 in)
Private collection (Possibly owned by Jacques Hachuel, Paris)

Triptych 1970
1970
Catalogue Raisonné Number 70-10
Oil on canvas
198 x 147.5cm (78 x 58 in)
National Gallery of Australia, Canberra
Purchased 1973, central panel features figures inspired by Eadweard Muybridge's photograph of wrestlers. Left and right panels feature Bacon's lover, George Dyer.

In Memory of George Dyer
1971
Catalogue Raisonné Number 71-09
Oil and Dry Transfer Lettering on Canvas
198 x 147.5cm (78 x 58 in)
Beyeler Foundation, Riehen, near Basel
One of the three Black Triptychs (with Triptych–August 1972 and Triptych, May–June 1973) painted by Bacon following the death of his lover, George Dyer.

Three Studies of Figures on Beds
1972
Catalogue Raisonné Number 72-01
Oil and Pastel on Canvas
198 x 147.5cm (78 x 58 in)
The Esther Grether Family Collection, Basel
The figures are inspired by Eadweard Muybridge's photographs of wrestlers

Triptych–August 1972
1972
Catalogue Raisonné Number 72-07
Oil and Sand on Canvas
198 x 147.5 cm
Tate, London
One of the three Black Triptych's (with In Memory of George Dyer and Triptych, May–June 1973), painted by Bacon following the death of his lover, George Dyer.

Three Portraits: Posthumous Portrait of George Dyer, Self-portrait, and Portrait of Lucian Freud
1973
Catalogue Raisonné Number 73-01
Oil on canvas
198 x 147.5cm (78 x 58 in)
The Esther Grether Family Collection, Basel

Triptych, May–June 1973
1973
Catalogue Raisonné Number 73-03
Oil on canvas
198 x 147.5cm (78 x 58 in)
The Esther Grether Family Collection, Basel
One of the three "Black triptychs" (with Triptych–August 1972 and In Memory of George Dyer). Painted in memory of Dyer who committed suicide on the eve of Bacon's retrospective at Paris's Grand Palais, on 24 October 1971, the triptych is a portrait of the moments before Dyer's death from an overdose of pills in their hotel room.
Triptych, May–June 1973 was purchased at auction in 1989 by Swiss businesswoman Esther Grether for $6.3 million ($16.4 million as of 2025), then a record for a Bacon painting. Grether is believed to own three other Bacon triptychs from the 1970s.

Triptych March 1974
1974
Catalogue Raisonné Number 74-02
Oil on canvas
198 x 147.5cm (78 x 58 in)
Fundación Juan March, Madrid

Triptych 1976
1976
Catalogue Raisonné Number 76-05
Oil, Pastel and Dry Transfer Lettering on Canvas
198 x 147.5cm (78 x 58 in)
Private collection of Roman Abramovich
Sold in May 2008 for $86.3 million ($129 million as of 2025), to Russian businessman Roman Abramovich, holds the record for the highest price paid for a post-war work of art at auction.

Triptych 1974–1977
1974 (Altered in 1977)
Catalogue Raisonné Number 77-05
Oil and Dry Transfer Lettering on Canvas
198 x 147.5cm (78 x 58 in)
Private collection of Joe Lewis
Features Bacon's lover George Dyer "writhing and struggling on a near-deserted beach watched by two disconcerting figures". Sold in February 2008 to currency trader and businessman Joe Lewis for £26.3 million (£42.9 million as of 2025), then a record for postwar artwork bought in Europe.

Triptych – Studies of the Human Body (1979)
1979
Catalogue Raisonné Number 79-01
Oil on canvas
198 x 147.5cm (78 x 58 in)
Private collection
Central panel marks final appearance of figures inspired by wrestlers from the photographs of Muybridge. Sold by Stanley J. Seeger for $8.6m in 2001 ($15.6 million as of 2025), then a record price for a Bacon painting.

Triptych Inspired by the Oresteia of Aeschylus
1981
Catalogue Raisonné Number 81-03
Oil on canvas
198 x 147.5cm (78 x 58 in)
Astrup Fearnley Museum of Modern Art, Oslo

Triptych 1983
1983
Catalogue Raisonné Number 83-07
Oil, Pastel and Aerosol Paint on Canvas
198 x 147.5cm (78 x 58 in)
Private collection of Juan Abelló, Madrid.

Three Studies for a Portrait of John Edwards
1984
Catalogue Raisonné Number 84-05
Oil and Aerosol Paint on Canvas
198.3 x 148cm (78 x 58 in)
Private collection
Features Bacon's companion and sole heir, John Edwards. Sold by Pierre Chen at Christie's in 2014 for $80.8 million.

Study for a Self-Portrait—Triptych, 1985–86
1985-1986
Catalogue Raisonné Number 86-02
Oil and Aerosol Paint on Canvas
198 x 147.5cm (78 x 58 in)
Private Collection

Triptych 1986-87
1986-1987
Catalogue Raisonné Number 87-01
Oil, Pastel, Aerosol Paint and Dry Transfer Lettering on Canvas
198 x 147.5cm (78 x 58 in)
Private collection, Switzerland

Triptych 1987
1987
Catalogue Raisonné Number 87-05
Oil, Pastel and Aerosol Paint on Canvas
198 x 147.5cm (78 x 58 in)
Private collection, The Estate of Francis Bacon

Second Version of Triptych 1944
1988
Catalogue Raisonné Number 88-05
Oil and Aerosol Paint on Canvas
198 x 147.5cm (78 x 58 in)
Tate, London
The second version of Three Studies for Figures at the Base of a Crucifixion (1944). Painted by Bacon after the 1944 triptych was deemed too fragile to travel to New York for an exhibition.

Triptych 1991
1991
Catalogue Raisonné Number 91-02
Oil and Aerosol Paint on Canvas
198 x 147.5cm (78 x 57 in)
Museum of Modern Art, New York City
Bacon's last triptych, features formula one driver Ayrton Senna, José Capelo, as well as a self-portrait of Bacon.

== See also ==
- Triptychs by Francis Bacon
- List of paintings by Francis Bacon

== Bibliography ==
- Baldassari, Anne. Bacon and Picasso. Flammarion, 2005. ISBN 978-2-08-030486-5
- Davies, Hugh; Yard, Sally. Francis Bacon. New York: Cross River Press, 1986. ISBN 978-0-89659-447-0
- Dawson, Barbara; Sylvester, David. Francis Bacon in Dublin. London: Thames & Hundson, 2002. ISBN 978-0-500-28254-0
- Farr, Dennis; Peppiatt, Michael; Yard, Sally. Francis Bacon: A Retrospective. Harry N Abrams, 1999. ISBN 978-0-8109-2925-8
- Russell, John. Francis Bacon (World of Art). Norton, 1971. ISBN 978-0-500-20169-5
- Sylvester, David. Looking back at Francis Bacon. London: Thames and Hudson, 2000. ISBN 978-0-500-01994-8
