= Three Studies for Self-Portrait (1979) =

Painting by Francis Bacon

Three Studies for a Self-Portrait, 1979–80, 37.5 x 31.8cm. Metropolitan Museum of Art

Three Studies for a Self-Portrait is an oil-on-canvas triptych painting by the Irish-born English artist Francis Bacon. Two of the paintings are signed and dated 1979, and the third is signed and dated 1979–1980.

The triptych is usually viewed by art historians as penetrating self-examinations in the aftermath of the suicide of his lover George Dyer; one of a series of inward-looking self-portraits completed during the 1970s. Bacon was seventy at the time, but depicts himself as much younger.

== Description ==
The triptych shows three distorted self-portraits of the artist's face, each emerging from a flat, dark background. The triptych format allows Bacon to show three aspects of his face: the central portrait viewed face-on, and with slight three-quarter views to either side, similar to a police mug shot. Each of the oil-on-canvas paintings measures 14.75 by 12.5 inches (37.5 cm × 31.8 cm).

Bacon often said he loathed his own face, which he described as resembling pudding. He said that he resorted to self-portraiture as his other subjects were 'dying like flies, so there was no one else left to paint'. Yet, self-portraits dominate his 1970s and early 1980s work after Dyer's suicide, culminating in his masterpiece Study for a Self-Portrait—Triptych, 1985–86, after which he largely abandoned the theme. Within this sequence, this triptych is unique for its dark colourisation, sculptural feel, and unique lighting with each panel lit from an unseen source from above.

As with most of his mid-period portrait work, Bacon seeks to convey the brutality and impact of life on his sitters through broad, thick brushstrokes that severely distort the subject's face. As with most of these works, the heads, which are slightly smaller than life-sized, are confined in tightly constricted spaces, against depthless and undefined backgrounds. According to the Metropolitan Museum of Art in New York, where the triptych is kept, this focus "allows only for ruminations on the face itself – its ravages, its deep psychological depths, and the sense of turning around it slowly, going from one frame to the next, as if in a languorous panning shot." The triptych also differs from his usual work with its deep black backgrounds, which further serve to draw the viewer's eye to the sitter's facial features and its delicately rendered complexions.

Although Bacon was socially gregarious, he was very protective of his private life, and especially his working methods. He painted from photographs rather than life, and would not allow visitors to his studio during his working hours. Thus, his self-portraits gave a rare insight into his inner life at this time.

The paintings were first exhibited at the Marlborough Gallery in 1980, and acquired by Russian-born Mexican film producer Jacques Gelman and his wife Natasha. After the death of Jacques in 1986 and of Natasha in 1998, the triptych was bequeathed to the Metropolitan along with 80 other works from the couple's $300m collection of modern art .

An edition of 150 colour lithographs was published by Éditions de la Différence in Paris in 1981, printed by Arts Litho and signed in pencil by the artist. One example was sold by Bonhams in London in 2004 for £4,541, including buyer's premium. By 2013, Bacon's reputation had increased to such an extent that another example of the print was sold online by Christie's for £30,000.

== See also ==
- List of paintings by Francis Bacon

== Sources ==
- Schmied, Wieland. Francis Bacon: Commitment and Conflict. Munich: Prestel, 1996. ISBN 3-7913-1664-8
- Sylvester, David. The Brutality of Fact: Interviews With Francis Bacon. London: Thames and Hudson, 1987. ISBN 978-0-500-27475-0
- Zweite, Armin. The Violence of the Real. London: Thames and Hudson, 2006. ISBN 0-500-09335-0
