= Triptych–August 1972 =

Triptych by Francis Bacon

Triptych–August 1972. Tate, London

Triptych–August 1972 is a large oil-on-canvas triptych by the British artist Francis Bacon. It was painted in memory of Bacon's lover George Dyer who committed suicide on 24 October 1971, the eve of the artist's retrospective at Paris's Grand Palais, then the highest honour Bacon had received.

The work is the second of three "Black Triptychs" completed in the following years as a memorial to his lover. The dates of the last two triptychs are included in their titles, indicating that Bacon intended them as almost diary entries into a very bleak period in his life. As such the paintings are records of how Bacon was coping with the loss of Dyer at that particular time. They are haunted and permeated by the inevitable feelings of guilt experienced by anybody who has lost a close friend to suicide.

== Context ==
Dyer and Bacon in the mid-1960s. Photograph by John Deakin

Bacon never really recovered from Dyer's suicide, and never again had such a close or long-standing sexual partner. He said, "people say you forget about death, but you don't. After all, I've had a very unfortunate life, because all the people I've been really fond of have died. And you don't stop thinking about them; time doesn't heal." He expanded further in the 1985 South Bank Show documentary stating that "[people] are always trying to defeat death by leaving images, but it won't make any difference; we'll just be dead, though the image may live on".

The black triptychs are so named because of their bleak mood and due to the active role the black paint plays in each. In essence each is a memento mori, and they are part of a larger series of works painted in the aftermath, a succession of paintings that include smaller single heads of Dyer, and a number of Bacon's self-portraits that extend into the mid 80s, perhaps as far as his late masterpiece, Study for a Self-Portrait—Triptych, 1985–86. Of that work he said that people had died "around me like flies and I've had nobody else to paint but myself".

In this work Dyer is presented as a figure struggling in vain to survive; in the triptych of 1973 he is finally defeated, naked and vomiting into a toilet basin in one panel, in another wandering towards an open door to lay down and die. The panels in Triptych–August 1972 document the final hours of Dyer's life, but in common with the other two works in the series, internally the sequencing of individual panels defy narrative interpretation; they cannot be read from left to right, and any depiction is as desperate as an other.

== Description ==
The portraits on the wing panels derive from photographs of Dyer taken by John Deakin in the mid-1960s. The painted images remain close to those photographs, except that the studio wall has been replaced by a black background. The panels show Dyer in his underwear, posed on a chair in the artist's studio. He appears muscular and physically strong, yet also restless and uneasy, and both panels are charged with movement and tension. Dyer is presented as a figure literally coming apart: his body is mutilated, and in both panels the black border merges into his form, leaving a void where large sections of his torso would otherwise be. At the same time, he appears to melt, with blobs of flesh falling to the ground beneath him. Bacon described this effect as portraying "the life flowing out of him".

The central painting shows two men engaged in sexual activity; Bacon is presumably recalling his encounters with his dead lover. The image is based on Eadweard Muybridge's series of photographs of wrestlers—a sequence to which Bacon often referred—but it carries the idea much further by directly associating the act of love with violence. Even so, the panel is comparatively chaste; the upper figure is depicted without genitals. Art historian Denis Farr argued that their embrace is devoid of affection, and that they appear instead locked in "mortal combat". The outer wings are structured around a pair of long isosceles triangles, set against the low isosceles triangle of the central image. In the outer wings, the rear rectangles are flanked by inward-facing white triangles. This compositional arrangement may have been influenced by Matisse's Bathers by a River, which likewise employs geometric forms to separate three figures and create broad bands. As in all of the Black Triptychs, doorways predominate, taking on a menacing, foreboding presence symbolic of death and of the void through which the subject is about to pass.

As with the third triptych in the series, Triptych, May–June 1973, each panel includes a wall with a large open door behind Dyer. It is this doorway that emits the darkness, rendered in black paint, which overwhelms and quite literally consumes the representations of Dyer by removing large sections of flesh. In this work, the Dyer figure in the left wing has lost most of his torso; in the right wing, the blackened area extends from the waist to the jaw. Both figures in the centre panel have also been eroded and reduced to little more than head and upper body. Art critic Wieland Schmied wrote that, had the scene been set only a few moments later, the black would have "swallowed [them] up entirely". Bacon first introduced this motif in his 1965 Crucifixion; however, whereas that work is set in an open and public space, the figures in these panels are isolated and alone.

== See also ==
- The Black Triptychs
- List of paintings by Francis Bacon

== Sources ==
- Dawson, Barbara; Sylvester, David. Francis Bacon in Dublin. London: Thames & Hudson, 2000. ISBN 0-500-28254-4
- Farr, Dennis; Peppiatt, Michael; Yard, Sally. Francis Bacon: A Retrospective. NY: Harry N Abrams, 1999. ISBN 0-8109-2925-2
- Peppiatt, Michael. Anatomy of an Enigma. Westview Press, 1996. ISBN 0-8133-3520-5
- Russell, John, Francis Bacon (World of Art). London: Norton, 1971. ISBN 0-500-20169-2
- Schmied, Wieland. Francis Bacon: Commitment and Conflict. Munich: Prestel. ISBN 3-7913-1664-8
- Sylvester, David. The Brutality of Fact: Interviews With Francis Bacon. London: Thames and Hudson, 1987. ISBN 0-500-27475-4
- van Alphen, Ernst. Francis Bacon and the Loss of Self. London: Reaktion Books, 1992. ISBN 0-948462-33-7
- Zweite, Armin (ed). The Violence of the Real. London: Thames and Hudson, 2006. ISBN 0-500-09335-0
