= Triptych Inspired by the Oresteia of Aeschylus =

Triptych by Francis Bacon

Francis Bacon, Triptych Inspired by the Oresteia of Aeschylus, 1981

Triptych Inspired by the Oresteia of Aeschylus is a 1981 oil-on-canvas triptych painting by Francis Bacon. It is one of 28 large triptych paintings by Bacon, each comprising three oil on canvas panels which measure 198 cm × 147.5 cm (78.0 in × 58.1 in).

== Inspiration ==
The work draws inspiration from The Oresteia, a trilogy of ancient Greek tragic plays by Aeschylus, which was also an inspiration for other earlier large triptychs, including Bacon's 1944 breakthrough Three Studies for Figures at the Base of a Crucifixion. The Oresteia recounts three linked mythic tales of revenge: the first recounting the murder of King Agamemnon after he returned from the Siege of Troy, with Queen Clytemnestra killing her husband to avenge his sacrifice of their daughter Iphigenia to secure a safe journey home; in the second, their son Orestes murders Clytemnestra to avenge his father; and in the third, Orestes is pursued by the Erinyes, also known as the Furies, the three female deities of vengeance.

In a letter sent to Michel Leiris in 1981, Bacon described re-reading read Aeschylus: he did not want to create a historical painting of one of the characters, such as Agamemnon or Clytemnestra; rather, he tried "to create images of the sensations that some of the episodes created inside me … an image of the effect that was produced inside me." The violence of The Oresteia found echoes in Bacon's own tortured personal life, from the physical abuse he suffered at the hands of his father, through his preference for roughly masochistic homosexual encounters, and the suicide of his lover George Dyer.

== Format and themes ==
The triptych form echoes a Christian altarpiece, with the main "crucifixion" in the central panel flanked by two supporting figures. Each panel depicts abstracted body parts in a space delineated by cream walls meeting beige floors. In the central panel, the mutilated body of the king, with the spine exposed, is raised on a box-like dais, with blocks of the floor and wall coloured blood red. In each of the left and right panels, the monstrous form of a Fury is suspended in a wire framed box in front of an open door. In the left panel, a bloody smear spreads across the floor from under an open door, and the Fury has blood spurting from an orifice. The fleshy shape of the Fury in the left panel was based on photographs of a pelican in flight taken by Eadweard Muybridge.

== Value and ownership ==
The triptych was sold by Marlborough Fine Art to the Norwegian industrialist and art collector Hans Rasmus Astrup in 1984. It was displayed at the Astrup Fearnley Museum of Modern Art in Oslo from its foundation in 1993, until it was deaccessioned and sold in 2020, to put the museum on a stronger financial basis and to enable it to make new acquisitions to diversify its collection. An auction scheduled for 13 May 2020 was postponed, and the painting was eventually sold for US$84,550,000 in an online auction held by Sotheby's in New York on 29 June 2020. The price was the third highest paid for a Bacon work at auction, after the US$142.4 million paid for Three Studies of Lucian Freud in 2013, and US$86.3 million paid for Triptych, 1976 in 2008.

== See also ==
- List of paintings by Francis Bacon
