= Triptych 1974–1977 =

Painting by Francis Bacon

Triptych 1974–1977 (CR 77–05) is a triptych painting by Francis Bacon. The work was completed in 1974, with the reverse of each panel titled, signed and dated "Tryptich [sic] May–June 1974 Francis Bacon", with the central panel reworked in 1977. It is the last of several triptych works that commemorate Bacon's lover George Dyer who died from a barbiturates overdose on 24 October 1971, the eve of the artist's retrospective at Paris's Grand Palais, then the highest honour Bacon had received. It was finished in time to be included in another major retrospective exhibition at the Metropolitan Museum of Art in New York in 1974.

Bacon drew inspiration from works by Degas in the National Gallery collection, including Beach Scene (c.1869-70), and his pastel drawing After the Bath, Woman Drying Herself (1890–95).

Made on canvas with oil, pastel and dry transfer lettering, each panel measures 78 in × 58 in (200 cm × 150 cm) and shows a scene in an outside space, with a sandy coloured ground similar to a beach, with the sea and sky behind, along a curving horizon like the dado of an oval room. To the left and right, bruised male figures recline on a white sunbed with a black umbrella. Two other figures are seen in the distance in the left panel. The features of the figure in the right panel resemble Dyer.

In the central panel, a male torso - resembling a sculpture by Michelangelo, or the torso in Degas's pastel - stands in a purplish pool before a dark aperture like a square hole in the canvas. The torso is observed by two ghostly men's heads based on photographs Bacon had collected. The left is based on an image of Raymond Poincaré in Phenomena of Materialisation by Albert von Schrenck-Notzing published in English in 1920; and the right is based on a photograph of Sir Austen Chamberlain from Foundations of Modern Art by Amédée Ozenfant published in English in 1931 (but this figure also resembles Michel Leiris). When originally completed in 1974, the central panel included a third figure, based on a photograph Edweard Muybridge of a "man falling prone and aiming rifle". Bacon painted this figure out in 1977, to create the finalised work.

The triptych has passed through several private collections and was last sold at Christie's in February 2008, and bought by Joe Lewis for £26,340,500. It has been displayed in a dining room on Lewi's private yacht Aviva.

== See also ==
- The Black Triptychs
- List of paintings by Francis Bacon
