= Portrait of Michel Leiris (1976) =

1976 painting by Francis Bacon

- Artist: Francis Bacon
- Year: 1976
- Medium: Oil on canvas
- Dimensions: 34 cm × 29 cm (13 in × 11 in)
- Location: Musée National d'Art Moderne; Paris

Portrait of Michel Leiris (sometimes Study for Portrait of Michel Leiris) is a 1976 oil-on-canvas-panel painting by the Irish-born British artist Francis Bacon. It is the first of two portraits Bacon made of his close friend, the French surrealist writer and anthropologist Michel Leiris; the second followed in 1978.

The painting has been in the collection of the Musée National d'Art Moderne, Paris, since it was gifted by Michel and Louise Leiris in 1984. It was described by art critic and curator David Sylvester as "easily Bacon's finest portrait in close-up".

== Description ==
Leiris is depicted against a flat black background, his face rendered in a radial swirl of luminous colours, his features distorted in a style typical of Bacon's portraits of the 1960s and 1970s. Only his left eye remains intact from these distortions, and is over-sized compared to the rest of his face; the theme of the painting seems to center on the sense of vision. He sees to be, according to the critic Ernst van Alphen "under the influence of something he sees. He is in a kind of hypnotic trance".

The painting places an emphasis on Leiri's skull, and has been compared x-ray photographs used as source for his 1933 Crucifixion. For the same reason, and because of its reconstruction of the human head, it has also been compared to African tribal masks, which Bacon was keenly interested in.

== See also ==
- List of paintings by Francis Bacon

== Sources ==
- Davies, Hugh; Yard, Sally. Francis Bacon. New York: Cross River Press, 1986. ISBN 0-89659-447-5
- Russell, John. Francis Bacon (World of Art). New York: Norton, 1971. ISBN 0-500-20169-2
- Sylvester, David. Looking back at Francis Bacon. London: Thames and Hudson, 2000. ISBN 0-500-01994-0
- van Alphen, Ernst. Francis Bacon and the Loss of Self. London: Reaktion Books, 1992. ISBN 0-948462-33-7
