= Esther Grether =

Swiss art collector and businesswoman (1936–2025)

- Born: Esther Kast; 4 April 1936; Basel, Switzerland
- Died: 27 August 2025 (aged 89); Basel, Switzerland
- Occupations: Chair, Doetsch Grether Group
- Known for: Art collector
- Spouse: Hans Grether (died 1975)
- Children: 2

Esther Grether (nee Kast, 4 April 1936 – 27 August 2025) was a Swiss art collector and businesswoman. In August 2025, Forbes estimated her net worth at US$2.3 billion.

== Career ==
Grether inherited a beauty and health care products company from her late husband Hans Grether in 1975 that she continued to run with her two children. She was chair of the Basel-based Doetsch Grether Group for more than thirty years. She was on the Swatch Group's board of directors from 1986 to 2014.

In 2013, Forbes magazine estimated she and her family's net worth at US$1.5 billion.

=== Art collection ===
Grether possessed one of the most valuable private collections of 20th-century art in the world. Her collection reportedly included more than 600 pieces and included works by Pablo Picasso, Paul Cézanne, Salvador Dalí, Francis Bacon, and Alberto Giacometti. The collection was kept in a converted printing factory which was also her home. Grether owned Bacon's Triptych, May–June 1973 (one of Bacon's three "Black Triptychs") which she purchased at auction in 1989 for $6.3 million, a record price for a Bacon painting at that time. She is also believed to have owned three other Bacon triptychs from the 1970s.

In December 1962, it was thanks to a bank guarantee provided by Hans Grether, secured on Doetsch Grether shares, that the Basel art dealer Ernst Beyeler was able to buy the American collector G. David Thompson's entire collection of 70 Giacometti works. She died in Basel on 27 August 2025, at the age of 89.

== Personal life ==
Grether was born on 4 April 1936 in Basel.

She was married to Hans Grether until his death in 1975. They had two children, Hans Christoph and Susanne, who are both involved in the family office.

She died on 27 August 2025, at the age of 89.
