= Three Figures in a Room =

1964 painting by Francis Bacon

Three Figures in a Room, 1964. Centre Georges Pompidou, Paris

Three Figures in a Room is a 1964 oil-on-canvas triptych painting by British artist Francis Bacon. Each panel measures 198 × 147 centimetres (78 × 58 in) and shows a separate view of his lover George Dyer, whom Bacon first met in 1963. It is the first of Bacon's works to feature Dyer, a model to whom he returned repeatedly in his paintings. The work has been described as Bacon's first secular triptych.

Bacon had been painting triptychs since his in 1944 break-through Three Studies for Figures at the Base of a Crucifixion. Three Figures continues the theme of Bacon studying a single subject from different angles. Although painted on three separate canvases, each image occupies the same space, marked by a brown elliptical floor and yellowish walls which continue across the panels. It defies narrative justification for a single model to appear three times in the same area.

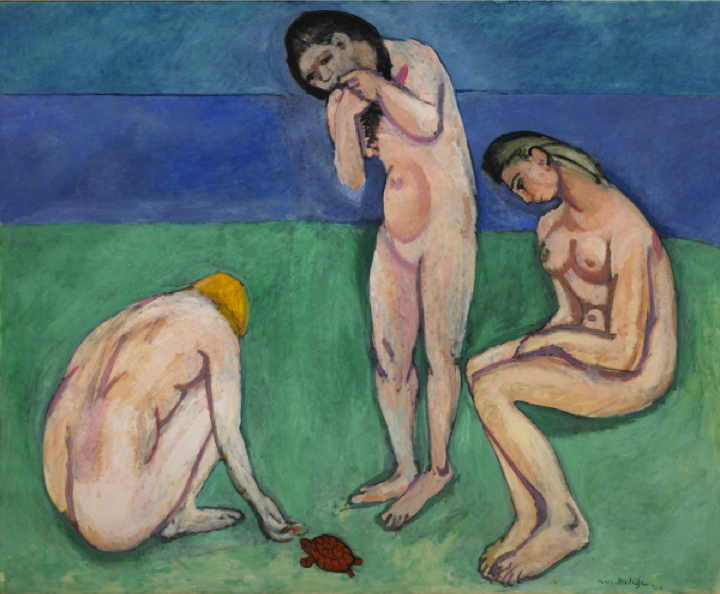
Bathers with a Turtle (Baigneuses), 1907–08, by Henri Matisse, Saint Louis Art Museum, St. Louis

Dyer is depicted in three different positions, all twisted and contorted. Bacon uses large and vigorous brushstrokes to create distinctive splashes of colour. In the left panel, a naked Dyer sits on a toilet facing away from the viewer; he rests on a massive black bed or chair in the centre panel; and he is sitting contorted on a pedestal chair in the right panel. The creased back of the left figure may be inspired by Edgar Degas's drawing After the Bath, Woman Drying Herself, and also possibly by the Belvedere Torso. The art critic David Sylvester has suggested that the centre and right figures may be inspired by Michelangelo's sculptures in the Medici Chapel, and draws parallels with the three figures in Henri Matisse's Bathers with a Turtle.

The work was bought by the French state in 1968 and has been part of the collection of the Centre Georges Pompidou since 1976.

== See also ==
- Triptychs by Francis Bacon
