= The Black Triptychs =

Sets of paintings by Francis Bacon (1909–1992)

Triptych–August 1972. Oil on canvas, Tate Gallery

Triptych, May–June 1973, 1973. Oil on canvas. Private collection, Switzerland. The alarm indicated by the arrows in this work betrays the stoicism Bacon displayed on the night of the suicide and premiere, when he acted the model host, and met politicians and dignitaries "as if nothing had happened"

The Black Triptychs are a series of three triptychs painted by the British artist Francis Bacon between 1972 and 1974. Bacon admitted that they were created as an exorcism of his sense of loss following the suicide of his former lover and principal model, George Dyer. On the evening of 24 October 1971, two days before the opening of Bacon's career-making retrospective at the Grand Palais, Dyer, then 36, alcoholic, deeply insecure and suffering severe and long-term depression, committed suicide through an overdose of drink and barbiturates in a room at the Paris hotel Bacon had allowed him to share during a brief period of reconciliation following years of bitter recrimination.

Bacon, a near-alcoholic himself, felt an acute sense of mortality and awareness of the fragility of life after his former lover's death. This awareness was heightened by the death of many other close friends during the following decade. The most acute paintings after the loss of his friends are considered to be the many images of Dyer, including the three "Black triptychs", Three Portraits: Posthumous Portrait of George Dyer, Self-Portrait, Portrait of Lucian Freud of 1973, and numerous heads painted within three years of 1972.

The triptychs show, sequentially, the moments before, during and after Dyer's suicide. The scenes are not represented linearly; they do not always read from left to right. Each shows a comatose man, collapsed or dead near the hotel room's lavatory seat. In most, Dyer is followed by black horizontal fleshy winged creatures, raw and red/pink blobs of dying flesh, or by painterly arrows. These devices act both as pointers to the depravity and tragedy of the scene and as manifestations of Bacon's guilt at the death of an emotionally dependent friend.

== Background ==
=== Dyer's suicide ===
Bacon met Dyer—in an often repeated but likely fictitious story—when Bacon caught the younger man breaking in through the roof of his flat in a failed burglary. Dyer was then in his early 30s, tall and athletic, and largely uneducated and from an impoverished East London background—all of which appealed to Bacon's taste for rough trade. There was an immediate connection between the two men, and from the mid-1960s Dyer became Bacon's principal model and muse. However, while Bacon's fame grew and critical attention of the successful portraits of Dyer brought the younger man a degree of fame and notoriety, the focus on Bacon as the star of the art world overshadowed Dyer's neediness, and he inevitably came to see himself as just another associate and hanger-on.

Dyer photographed by John Deakin, retouched by Bacon, who often folded, creased or spattered with paint his photographs of friends so as to find distortions he could exploit in his paintings. Although Dyer was handsome and charming, he was out of his depth when dealing with both Bacon's wasp-tongued Soho set and intellectual art world friends.

He barely understood or liked the older man's portraits, even though they were the sole reason he was tolerated and allowed to drink with Bacon's Soho circle of friends. He admitted of the paintings, "I think they are really horrible and I don't really understand them." When insecurity set in, Dyer defended himself by drinking from when he woke until collapsing.

Dyer quickly grated on Bacon's art-world friends, who were by then his only friends, but for whom he had lost whatever charm he had begun with—not much, they believed. Bacon tired of the routine of carrying Dyer emotionally and often physically home. Dyer planted cannabis in Bacon's Meuse and rang the police after one occasion. After a later attempt during a visit to New York when Bacon tried to end the relationship, Dyer threatened to jump from a skyscraper, and police again became involved.

Bacon said, "He became totally impossible with drink. The rest of the time, when he was sober, he could be terribly engaging and gentle. He used to love being with children and animals. I think he was a nicer person than me. He was more compassionate. He was much too nice to be a crook. That was the trouble. He only went in for stealing because he had been born into it, into that whole East End atmosphere where it's expected of you. Everybody he knew went in for it. If he'd had any discipline, he could have got a job easily, because he was very good with his hands. I got him something with my framer - he was going to learn gilding, which pays very good money. But he didn't make anything of it. I can understand that it's much more exciting to steal than to go out to a job every day, but in the end he did nothing but go and get completely drunk. In that way, my life has been a disaster. So many of the people I've known have been drunks or suicides, and all the ones I've been really fond of have died in one way or another. And it's only when they're dead that you realize just how fond of them you were."

When the relationship finally lost its spark and faded out, Dyer found himself adrift and alone, and descended into full-blown alcoholism, supplemented by anti-depressants and occasional amphetamine abuse. His dependency on Bacon continued from the late 1960s until 1971, when feeling pity, Bacon invited his former lover to attend his retrospective in Paris. Though dry at the time, Dyer was overwhelmed by the occasion and took refuge in quantities of drink and pills with which his body was no longer able to cope.

Bacon was informed of the suicide on the eve of the official opening. Though devastated, he continued to meet and greet the assembled critics, dealers and collectors. Most friends who were present believed that that night he displayed powers of self-control to which, according to biographer John Russell, "few of us could aspire". Yet Bacon was deeply affected by the loss of Dyer; he had recently lost four other close friends, two of them lovers, as well as his childhood nanny, also a gambling friend in his adulthood. From this point on, death haunted both his life and work, and became the dominant theme.

=== Aftermath ===
Center panel from Bacon's Study for a Self-Portrait—Triptych, 1985–86. This work was painted after an extended period of examination of the effect of age and time on both himself and his close friends, during a period when many of those around him died. Tied to the black triptychs in theme, format, structure and tone, this work is considered the masterpiece of his late period.

Throughout his career, Bacon consciously and carefully avoided giving any meaning or reason to his paintings, and pointedly stated that it was not his intention to convey any sort of narrative in his work. When Melvyn Bragg challenged him in a 1985 BBC interview with the observation that Triptych, May–June 1973 was the nearest he had come to telling a story, Bacon admitted that "it is in fact the nearest I've ever done to a story, because you know that is the triptych of how he [Dyer] was found". He went on to say that the work reflected not just his reaction to Dyer's death, but his general feelings about the fact that his friends were then dying around him "like flies". He explained how his old friends were "generally heavy drinkers" and that their deaths led directly to his composition of the meditative mid-1970s to mid-1980s self-portraits which highlighted his aging and awareness of the pace of time, often using a ticking clock as a motif for the passing of time. The motif of an expensive watch was at a time when homosexuality was illegal and kept underground in Britain, a common indicator to rough trade.

Bacon's own account of Triptych, May–June 1973 was recalled by Hugh Davies from conversations they had at the time of its composition:

Dyer overdosed from pills and alcohol and, from the evidence in the bathroom, he vomited in the sink. He was found slumped on the toilet. They had two bedrooms with an adjoining bathroom, so Bacon then painted the panels from different perspectives. One is from Dyer’s side and the other is from Bacon’s. He was very influenced by film as we know, and using the triptych format was a way of capturing time, but he wanted to avoid the obvious linear narrative, which is why he changed the order of events in the picture so you can’t read it from left to right. Dyer vomits in the right panel, and is dying, or dead, in a foetal position in the first panel.... As for the two arrows that he painted in the bottom section of both the left and right panels, he said that these additions gave the figures a specificity and formality that he likened to police photographs. He wanted to make the paintings seem more clinically distanced.

Bragg asked if the portraits painted in the wake of Dyer's death were depictions of his emotional reaction, Bacon explained that he did not consider himself to be an "expressionist painter". He said he was "not trying to express anything, I wasn't trying to express the sorrow about somebody committing suicide ... but perhaps it comes through without knowing it". When Bragg inquired if he often thought about death, the artist replied that he was always aware of it, and that although "it's just around the corner for [me], I don't think about it, because there's nothing to think about. When it comes, it's there. You've had it." Later in the interview, while reflecting on the loss of Dyer, Bacon observed that as part of aging, "life becomes more of a desert around you". He told Bragg that he believed in "nothing. We are born and we die and that's it. There is nothing else." Bragg asked Bacon what he did about that reality, and after the artist told him he did nothing about it, Bragg observed, "No Francis, you try and paint it."

== Series ==
The three works, In Memory of George Dyer, Triptych–August 1972 and Triptych, May–June 1973, are grouped by critics because they share title, date, format, subject matter and a stark black background intended as emblematic of death and mourning. While they are linked as a unified response to Dyer's suicide, their completion was punctuated by a number of individual portraits and other triptychs featuring Dyer, including the 1972 Three Studies of Figures on Beds which is both a celebration of the younger man's life and a lamentation of his early death. The Tate gallery display caption for Triptych–August 1972 reads, "What death has not already consumed seeps incontinently out of the figures as their shadows."

A number of other characteristics bind the triptychs. The form of a monochromatically rendered doorway features centrally in all, and each is framed by flat and shallow walls. In many, Dyer is stalked by a broad shadow which takes the form of pools of blood or flesh in some panels, or the wings of the angel of death in others. These shadows were interpreted by the art critic David Sylvester as silhouettes of "avenging prey", or in Baconian language "evocations of Aeschylean Furey".

Bacon never recovered from Dyer's suicide. His later work seems haunted by an awareness of loss, death and the effects of passage of time. He admitted that "although one is never exorcised, because people say you forget about death ... you don't ... time doesn't heal. But you concentrate on something which was an obsession, and what you would have put into your obsession you put into work."

== See also ==
- List of large triptychs by Francis Bacon
- List of paintings by Francis Bacon

== Bibliography ==
- Baldassari, Anne. Bacon and Picasso. Flammarion, 2005. ISBN 2-08-030486-0
- Davies, Hugh; Yard, Sally. Francis Bacon. New York: Cross River Press, 1986. ISBN 0-89659-447-5
- Dawson, Barbara; Sylvester, David. Francis Bacon in Dublin. London: Thames & Hundson, 2002. ISBN 0-500-28254-4
- Farr, Dennis; Peppiatt, Michael; Yard, Sally. Francis Bacon: A Retrospective. Harry N Abrams, 1999. ISBN 0-8109-2925-2
- Peppiatt, Michael. Anatomy of an Enigma. Westview Press, 1999. ISBN 0-8133-3520-5
- Russell, John. Francis Bacon (World of Art). Norton, 1971. ISBN 0-500-20169-2
- Sylvester, David. The Brutality of Fact: Interviews With Francis Bacon. London: Thames and Hudson, 1987. ISBN 0-500-27475-4
- Sylvester, David. Looking back at Francis Bacon. London: Thames and Hudson, 2000. ISBN 0-500-01994-0
- van Alphen, Ernst. Francis Bacon and the Loss of Self. London: Reaktion Books, 1992. ISBN 0-948462-33-7
