= Stanley J. Seeger =

American art collector (1930–2011)

Stanley Joseph Seeger Jr.
- Born: May 28, 1930; Milwaukee, Wisconsin, US
- Died: June 24, 2011 (aged 81)
- Occupation: Art collector

Stanley Joseph Seeger Jr. (28 May 1930 – 24 June 2011) was an American-born art collector. Seeger lived in Great Britain for the last three decades of his life.

== Early life ==
Seeger was born to Helen Buchanan Seeger and Dr. Stanley J. Seeger in Milwaukee. His parents met in the 1920s when his mother brought her own ailing mother to the Mayo Clinic, where Dr. Seeger was a surgeon. The couple then moved to Milwaukee, Wisconsin, where Seeger and his sister, Hannah, were born.

Seeger's maternal grandfather was William J. Buchanan, founder and owner of multiple privately held lumber companies in Arkansas, Louisiana, and Texas, including Bodcaw Enterprises. Buchanan died in 1923, and his only son, Will Buchanan—-a bachelor without children—-ran the companies until his death in 1940. In 1941, Seeger's family moved to Texarkana, Texas so that his father could run the various Buchanan companies.

Between 1902 and 1935, Buchanan companies shipped almost 7 billion feet of yellow pine lumber from their land and lumber mills, one of which was the largest mill in the world. The family's large land holdings led to significant oil interests; for example, one deal in about 1940 led the family to lease the oil rights to 350,000 acres of their land to H.L. Hunt. Apparently, the lease was signed as Seeger's uncle was hospitalized on his deathbed; Hunt slept in the adjacent hospital to get the deal signed. The need to move the lumber led to a financial interest in what became the Kansas City Southern Railway. With the death of his uncle, ownership of these companies was funneled towards the Seeger family.

Like their only son, Seeger's parents were collectors. His father collected books, and his mother collected antiques.

Seeger spent his senior year (1946–47) as a boarding student at Dallas’ Texas Country Day School, a forerunner of St. Mark's School of Texas. From his yearbook page: “Joe is quite frank in telling us that he is an artist and musician, and we expect any day to hear that he has taken off for the Latin Quarter.... Always true to his home country, the North, Joe tells us that he still dislikes Texas as much as he did when he first arrived. If Princeton is far enough north, he should be very happy there.”

At Princeton, Seeger studied architecture and music. While in college, he spent a year in Florence, Italy studying under composer Luigi Dallapiccola.

== Adult life ==
Seeger was private, and his exact travels were not well documented. It does appear that Seeger moved to Greece in the 1960s where he reportedly became a citizen as well as a keen sailor. In 1967, the military coup in Athens led him to move to the Canary Islands. He maintained an interest in Greece, however, eventually funding what became the Seeger Center for Hellenic Studies at his alma mater, Princeton.

Seeger was introduced to Christopher Cone, who was 24 years his junior, in 1979. They soon moved to England and remained partners for over 30 years until Seeger's death.

Seeger was also an amateur composer, but none of his music was ever performed. His obituary in The Telegraph described his music as "inhabiting an arcane territory where music met mathematics". Seeger was survived by Cone; they had lived in North Yorkshire for the last years of Seeger's life.

== Buying ==
According to a 2021 Art News article, Seeger's year in Florence led to an interest in such modern artists as Alberto Burri and Lucio Fontana, and he began collecting in earnest upon his return to New York in about 1950. Often buying anonymously at Sotheby's or through individual dealers, Seeger's collection went on to include works by such artists as Max Beckmann, Joseph Glasco, Joan Miró, Jasper Johns, Barbara Hepworth, J. M. W. Turner, Paul Gauguin, Egon Schiele, and many others.

In 1980, the year after Seeger and Cone met, they moved to England and made their largest and most public acquisition: Sutton Place, the Grade I listed Tudor manor house in Surrey. They bought the house from Paul Getty for £8 million, (equivalent to £43,330,000 in 2023), the highest price ever paid for a British property.

Seeger and Cone used the large space to house their collections and to offer concerts and exhibitions through their Sutton Place Heritage Trust. Controversially, Seeger hung Francis Bacon's Triptych – Studies of the Human Body (1979), one of his 28 large triptychs in the Great Hall at Sutton Place. Bacon himself visited Sutton Place to see his painting there, and Cone said that Bacon appreciated its location there. Sir Geoffrey Jellicoe was commissioned to create a major new garden, which included a serpentine lake and a number of themed spaces: at the time, it was the largest post-War landscaping commission for a private client.

During the Sutton Place years, and through the rest of his life, Seeger continued to buy (and sell) freely. As Cone told the Financial Times a few years after Seeger's death: “What Stanley was doing in his collecting life was creating episodes, like little nests. It was his way of keeping the outside world at bay. He was a very private and very shy man.”

== Selling ==
Seeger and Cone had underestimated the media attention that the purchase of Sutton Place would garner, and Seeger sold the property six years later, in 1986, to Frederick R. Koch. Cone later said that "I don't think Stanley ever anticipated that it would shine such a strong spotlight on himself. It didn't suit him, and it didn't suit me. The meter was running from the day that we moved in. We felt very lonely there, very exposed: two men living together in this great big country house. It was a statement too far." After selling Sutton Place, the two apparently lived on their yacht or in one of their 10 other houses.

In 1993 Seeger sold his entire collection of 88 artworks by the Spanish artist Pablo Picasso at Sotheby's in New York, raising over $32m. Cone would later describe selling so many Picassos during a down market as "hairy-scary". Seeger had told him that he no longer wanted the collection, feeling that once they had acquired a painting from Picasso's Rose Period it would be complete. Attending a viewing of his Picasso collection, Seeger, known for his privacy, overheard two people saying that they believed that Seeger didn't exist, which amused him. Seeger once said that his reason for purchasing a particular Picasso painting was that "It was so bad it needed to be taken out of circulation."

Seeger sold the Bacon triptych that had hung in Sutton Place for $8.6 million in 2001; at the time, it was the highest price paid for a work by that artist. When Bacon's 1969 triptych entitled "Three Studies of Lucian Freud" sold for $142.4 million in 2013 (thus setting a new record for a Bacon artwork sold at auction), Seeger expressed no regret for having sold his 1979 Bacon triptych in 2001.

Three years after his death, in March 2014, Sotheby's organized an auction of part of Seeger's collection. Entitled “One Thousand Ways of Seeing,” its curiosities included Orson Welles' personal shooting script for his 1941 film Citizen Kane, an armchair belonging to Winston Churchill, Rudolf Nureyev's coat-rack and copper bath, and a teapot belonging to Lord Nelson. In 2018, Sotheby's organized another auction, “A Private View: Property from the Country Home of Christopher Cone and Stanley J. Seeger.”

The architect and designer Sir Hugh Casson said of Seeger that he regarded "the chic as a badge of insecurity and the conventional as a signal of surrender".
