= Three Studies of the Male Back =

1970 painting by Francis Bacon

Francis Bacon, Three Studies of the Male Back, 1970

Three Studies of the Male Back is a 1970 oil-on-canvas triptych by the British painter Francis Bacon. Typical of Bacon's figurative but abstract and distorted style, it depicts male figures isolated within flat undistinguished interior spaces. Each figure is a portrait of Bacon's lover George Dyer.

There are similarities and differences between the three depictions of the male figure. Each man is shown sitting on a pedestal, within a trapezoidal box-like cage, facing away from the viewer. The framework encloses - almost entraps - the human figure. In each of the two side panels, a classical perspective would have the edge of the cage logically obscured behind the figure, but instead Bacon has the frame crossing the back of its head. The figure in each side panel is placed in front of a shaving mirror, but the glass visible to the viewer distorts the reflection. Splashes of red suggest injury. The smooth pink back of the figure in the left panel contrasts with the knotted red and blue tones of the figure in the right hand panel. The figure in the central panel sits in front of a mirror reading a newspaper, but the mirror is a flat grey and does not reflect.

The triptych is similar to contemporary works by Bacon, including his 1969 triptych Three Studies of Lucian Freud, and has been described as an "explicit homage" to Degas's 1890s painting After the Bath, Woman Drying Herself, held by the National Gallery, London. Each panel measures 198 centimetres (78 in) by 147.5 centimetres (58.1 in). The triptych is held by the Kunsthaus Zürich.

== See also ==
- List of paintings by Francis Bacon
