= Juan Abelló =

Spanish businessman and art collector

- Born: Juan Abelló Gallo; 1941 (age 84–85); Madrid, Spain
- Education: Complutense University of Madrid; Colegio del Pilar
- Occupation: Businessman
- Spouse: Ana Isabel Gamazo y Hohenlohe-Langenburg
- Children: 4

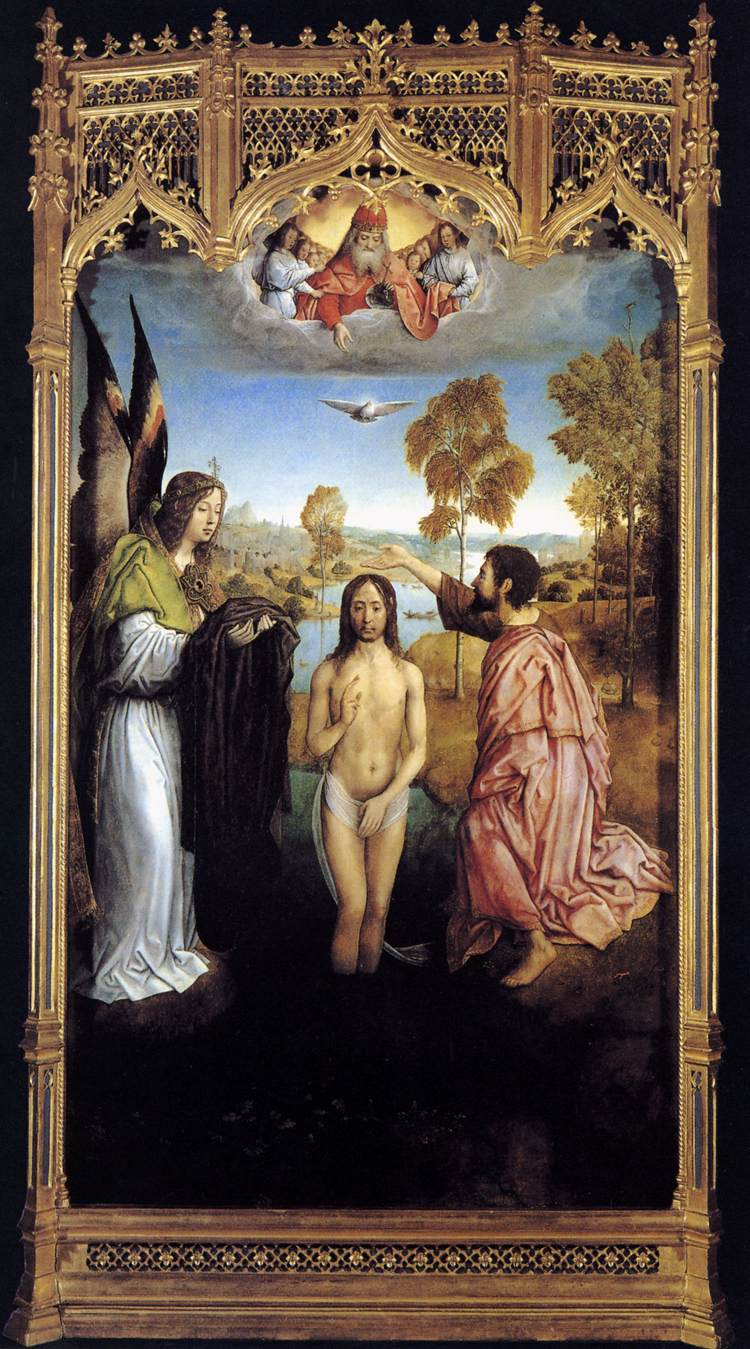
Juan de Flandes, The Baptism of Christ, c. 1496–1499. Oil on panel. Part of the Abelló collection.

Juan Abelló Gallo (born 1941) is a Spanish businessman and art collector. In March 2021, Forbes estimated his wealth at $3 billion.

== Early life ==
Juan Abelló was born in 1941 in Madrid, the son of a pharmacist father, Juan Abello Pascual. He has a bachelor's degree in pharmacy from the Complutense University of Madrid (1963), and a doctorate in pharmacy (1978) from Universidad Complutense de Madrid.

== Career ==
In 1966 Abelló was appointed managing director of Antibióticos, S.A., the family group founded by his pharmacist father, Juan Abello Pascual, in 1919. The company had obtained the first licence in Spain in 1934 to manufacture opioid-derived medication. In 1986, he led the disposal of Antibióticos and other family pharma assets (maintaining Alergia e Inmunología Abelló, S.A. and Alcaloides, S.A.) to Montedison.

In 1990, he founded Torreal, a family-owned global investment firm with more than 25 portfolio companies, diversified across various segments and geographies.

In 2013, through Torreal, he invested in Investindustrial which controlled 37.5% of the automobile manufacturer Aston Martin. In 2018, through Torreal and in a joint-venture with the British investment fund GHO, Abelló started the company of cannabis-derived products Linneo Health.

In 2018, he named his son Miguel Abelló Gamazo executive vice-president of Torreal, and then president of the company in 2020.

== Art collector ==
Abelló owns about 500 works of art, including pieces by Francisco Goya, El Greco, Edgar Degas, Pablo Picasso, Toulouse-Lautrec, Salvador Dalí, and Vincent van Gogh.

Abello owns one of the last large triptychs painted by Francis Bacon, Triptych 1983 (1983), and a small triptych by Bacon, Three Studies for a Portrait of Peter Beard (1975).

== Personal life ==
Abelló is married to Ana Isabel Gamazo y Hohenlohe-Langenburg, granddaughter of Prince Max Egon of Hohenlohe-Langenburg. They have four children. He is an avid deer hunter.
