= Triptych, 1976 =

Triptych by Francis Bacon

- Artist: Francis Bacon
- Year: 1976
- Medium: oil and pastel on canvas
- Dimensions: 198 cm × 147.5 cm (78 in × 58 in)
- Location: Private collection

Triptych, 1976 is a large triptych painted by the British artist Francis Bacon in 1976. It is held in a private collection.

== Description ==
It comprises three oil and pastel paintings on canvas.

The triptych contains ense colors and abstract shapes. Bacon used his usual narrative technique, starting on the left panel and working across. The piece draws on classical Greek iconography and mythology, and makes reference to Prometheus, as several interpretations claim. Bacon's friend, Peter Beard, was used as a model for one of the figures.

== Provenance ==
It is the second most expensive Bacon ever sold, after Three Studies of Lucian Freud, being auctioned for US$86 million in 2008.

In 2008 it was sold to the Russian businessman Roman Abramovich, in a Sotheby's auction on 14 May 2008 for $86 million, above the pre-sale estimate of $70 million. Prior to Abramovich, it was owned in a private European collection since its purchase from the Marlborough Gallery, London in 1977.

== See also ==
- Triptychs by Francis Bacon
