= José Capelo =

Spanish banker

- Born: José Capelo Blanco; January 1956 (age 69)
- Citizenship: Spanish
- Occupation: Banker

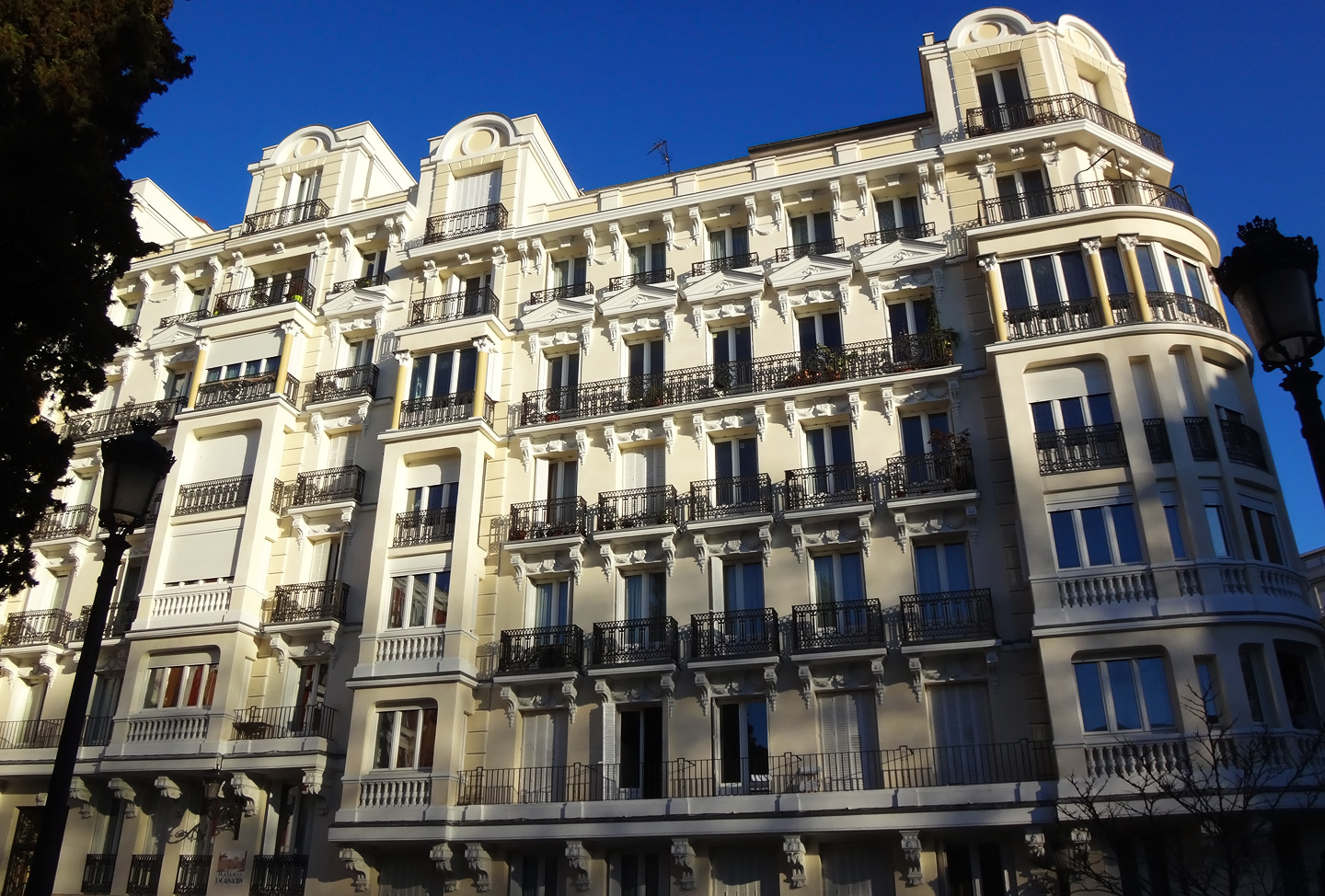
Plaza de la Encarnación, Madrid

José Capelo Blanco (born January 1956) is a Spanish banker who was a friend of the British artist Francis Bacon. He was the subject of a 1987 portrait, Portrait of José Capelo and Triptych 1991. Capelo was given paintings and US$4 million by the artist, something Bacon would later confide he regretted doing, before his death in 1992.

Capelo and Bacon met in 1988 at a party hosted by the British choreographer Sir Frederick Ashton.

In 2014, it was reported by The Sunday Times that in taped conversations Bacon had with his friend Barry Joule, which were not released until 12 years after Bacon's 1992 death (in accordance with Bacon's wishes), Bacon had fallen in love with Capelo and they had had an affair. The Art Gallery of New South Wales called it a "final passionate affair". Capelo has denied any romantic connection.

The 1987 portrait, Portrait of José Capelo is owned by the Swiss gallery, Galerie Gmurzynksa.

In March 2016, it was revealed that in July 2015, thieves had broken into Capelo's apartment in Madrid's Plaza de la Encarnación and stolen five Bacon paintings worth a total of about Euro 30 million, although the details of the actual works has not been released.

In July 2017 three of the stolen paintings were recovered in Spain. In May 2024 a fourth painting, Study for a Portrait of Jose Capelo, was recovered, also in Spain.
