= In Memory of George Dyer =

Painting by Francis Bacon (artist)

In Memory of George Dyer, Francis Bacon, 1971, Fondation Beyeler, Switzerland

In Memory of George Dyer (CR 71-09) is an triptych painting completed by Francis Bacon in November 1971. Each of the three panels measures 78 in × 58 in (200 cm × 150 cm). Made in oils with transfer lettering on canvas, the work is the first of Bacon's three "Black Triptychs" completed after Bacon's lover George Dyer died from a barbiturates overdose on 24 October 1971, the eve of the artist's retrospective at Paris's Grand Palais, then the highest honour Bacon had received.

Each panel is painted on the same flat pinkish background, with the side panels each having a red central strip, curved like the dado of an oval room. The left panel features a partially dressed couple grappling. The central canvass shows an interior scene with stairs, perhaps a hotel, occupied by a single shadowed male figure with one fleshy arm exposed. The right panel depicts a canvas with a portrait of Dyer, echoed in a dissolving pile of pigment on a table.

After a period in a private collection in New York, the work has been held by the Fondation Beyeler in Switzerland since 1987.

== See also ==
- The Black Triptychs
- List of paintings by Francis Bacon
