= Triptych Inspired by T.S. Eliot's Poem "Sweeney Agonistes" =

Triptych by Francis Bacon

- Artist: Francis Bacon
- Year: 1967
- Dimensions: 198.8 cm × 148.3 cm (78.3 in × 58.4 in)
- Location: Hirshhorn Museum and Sculpture Garden, Washington, D.C.

Triptych Inspired by T.S. Eliot's Poem "Sweeney Agonistes" (CR 67-16) is a 1967 oil-on-canvas triptych by British painter and artist Francis Bacon. The subtitle, referring to the poem "Sweeney Agonistes" by T. S. Eliot, was added by Bacon's gallerist Valerie Beston at Marlborough Fine Art and was not liked by Bacon; more recent catalogues simply refer to the Triptych of 1967.

The work was acquired by Joseph H. Hirshhorn in 1972, and it was donated that year to become part of the collection of the Hirshhorn Museum and Sculpture Garden, in Washington, D.C.

== See also ==
- Triptychs by Francis Bacon
