= John Deakin =

English photographer

Deakin in an undated photograph, early-mid 1950s

John Deakin (8 May 1912 – 25 May 1972) was an English photographer, best known for his work centred on members of Francis Bacon's Soho inner circle. Bacon based a number of famous paintings on photographs he commissioned from Deakin, including Portrait of Henrietta Moraes, Henrietta Moraes on a Bed and Three Studies of Lucian Freud.

Deakin also spent many years in Paris and Rome, photographing street scenes, but his only stable period of employment as a photographer were two stints of working for Vogue between 1947 and 1954. Deakin initially aspired to be a painter, and as his photographic career waned, Deakin devoted his time to painting in the 1960s, questioning the validity and status of photography as an art form. He showed little interest in curating and publicising his own work, so many of his photographs were lost, destroyed or damaged over time.

A chronic alcoholic, Deakin died in obscurity and poverty, but since the 1980s his reputation has grown through monographs, exhibitions and catalogues.

== Life and career ==
=== Early life and work for Vogue ===
One of Deakin's mid-1960s portraits of George Dyer. The picture contains pathos for the doomed Dyer, and was retouched and spattered with paint by Bacon.

Deakin was born in New Ferry on the Wirral, son of John Henry Deakin, a factory checker and machine minder for Lever Brothers at nearby Port Sunlight, and Elsie Mary, née Bond. He attended Calday Grange Grammar School. He left school at sixteen, and travelled around Ireland and Spain. He returned to London in the early 1930s where he met and started dating Arthur Jeffress. They spent much of the 1930s together travelling between London, Paris and Venice. During this time Deakin started as a painter but switched to photography. While in Paris in 1939 fashion illustrator Christian Bérard introduced Deakin to Michel de Brunhoff, editor of French Vogue. From 1940 until 1945, Deakin served in the British Army Film Unit as a photographer, where he photographed the Second Battle of El Alamein.

After the War, Deakin enjoyed two periods of employment as a staff photographer on the British edition of Vogue. The first period, from 1947 to 1948, ended in dismissal when he lost several valuable bits of photographic equipment. His second period was from 1951 to 1954, and during those three years Deakin was at his most active. He enjoyed the support of Vogue editor Audrey Withers, even though he disliked fashion photography. He excelled at portraits of leading figures in literature, theatre and film. His subjects included Dylan Thomas, John Huston, Luchino Visconti and many other artistic celebrities. Deakin recognised this work was his true vocation when he wrote:

Being fatally drawn to the human race, what I want to do when I take a photograph is make a revelation about it. So my sitters turn into my victims. But I would like to add that it is only those with a daemon, however small and of whatever kind, whose faces lend themselves to being victimised at all. And the only complaints I have ever had from my victims have been from the bad ones, the vainies, the meanies.

Notorious for "his blistering personality, bad behaviour and total disregard for others", Deakin was fired from Vogue for a second time in 1954, on account of his drinking and "an accumulation of minor incidents involving lateness, a series of crashing tripods, and inevitable arguments with fashion editors." Vogue editor Withers ensured he was paid off handsomely.

=== Later life and relationship with Francis Bacon ===
After being fired by Vogue for the second time, Deakin drifted from job to job and he enjoyed a retainer from The Observer until 1958. He spent long periods in Rome and in Paris during the 1950s, specialising in street photography. In 1951, John Lehmann published a book of Deakin's Rome photographs, Rome Alive, with text by Christopher Kinmonth. Deakin spent many years trying unsuccessfully to publish a book of his Paris photographs, but they were exhibited in 1956 in David Archer's bookshop in Soho. The catalogue accompanying the exhibition was written by Elizabeth Smart, a friend of Deakin. Smart's catalogue included the observation: "You certainly won't feel rested after a time in John Deakin's Paris. These pictures take you by the scruff of the neck and insist that you see. If you have never been to Paris, you will find it haunted when you arrive."

Portrait of Henrietta Moraes, 1966. Francis Bacon

Archer's bookshop, also in 1956, exhibited a second show, John Deakin's Rome. These were the only photography exhibitions Deakin achieved in his lifetime, and they attracted some critical acclaim. In The Times, Colin MacInnes reviewed the Paris photos: "Mr Deakin sees one side of Alice's looking glass and the infinite mysteries that lie behind it. Art critic David Sylvester wrote: "The pictures of Paris by John Deakin present a vision that is profoundly personal and profoundly strange, a vision which confounds and undermines all notions of where inanimate ends and animate takes over."

Deakin returned to painting in the mid-1950s, but with little success. Daniel Farson commented that "Deakin's artistic career had one consistency: the moment success came near he veered off in another direction." Deakin subsequently abandoned painting for making collages and sculptures in the 1960s.

Deakin, nevertheless, continued to photograph many of the major figures in the Soho art scene during the 1950s and 1960s, including Francis Bacon, Lucian Freud, Frank Auerbach and Eduardo Paolozzi. Though the two had a difficult personal relationship, Bacon held Deakin's work in high regard. After Deakin's death, Bacon described him as "the best portrait photographer since Nadar and Julia Margaret Cameron." Because Bacon "famously preferred photographic reference over live models for his painting", Deakin took many portraits on commission for Bacon, which the artist later used as source material for some of his most famous images. One of the most notable was Portrait of Isabel Rawsthorn Standing in a Street in Soho, 1967. Deakin's photos of George Dyer, Muriel Belcher and Henrietta Moraes have also been associated with Bacon's paintings of these sitters.

In February 2012, Bacon's 1963 Portrait of Henrietta Moraes, based on Deakin's photo, sold for £21.3 million. Deakin's photo of Lucian Freud supplied one of the sources for Bacon's 1969 painting Three Studies of Lucian Freud. This work was sold in 2013 for $142 million, making it one of the most expensive paintings ever sold. Deakin's photos of Freud also inspired a series of paintings by Jasper Johns, Jasper Johns: Regrets, which were exhibited at the Museum of Modern Art in 2014.

One of Deakin's mid-1960s photographs of Henrietta Moraes commissioned by Bacon. Moraes was upset by the invasive and almost pornographic approach Deakin took when photographing her, and in 1991 described him as "a horrible little man".

Freud and Bacon appeared as two of the Eight Portraits, an unpublished manuscript of photos and writings which was discovered after Deakin's death. In this work, Deakin wrote of Bacon: "He's an odd one, wonderfully tender and generous by nature, yet with curious streaks of cruelty, especially to friends. I think that in this portrait I managed to catch something of the fear which must underlie these contradictions in his character."

In 1972, Deakin was diagnosed with lung cancer, and underwent an operation to have it removed. While recuperating, he died of a heart attack while staying in the Old Ship Hotel, Brighton. In hospital, he had named Bacon as his next of kin, forcing the painter to identify the body. "It was the last dirty trick he played on me", Bacon remarked.

== Critical opinion and legacy ==
In 1979, the art critic John Russell wrote that, with Deakin's passing, "There was lost a photographer who often rivalled Bacon in his ability to make a likeness in which truth came wrapped and unpackaged. His portraits...had a dead-centred, unrhetorical quality. A complete human being was set before us, without additives." A series of exhibitions revived Deakin's reputation after the obscurity of his final years. In 1984, the Victoria & Albert Museum mounted the exhibition John Deakin: The Salvage of a Photographer. In 1996, the National Portrait Gallery, London, presented John Deakin Photographs. An exhibition, John Deakin: Tattoo Portraits was staged in Liverpool in 1999.

Daniel Farson wrote of his portraits: "I am sure he will be seen as one of the most disturbing photographers of the century. The expressions of his victims look suitably appalled for Deakin had no time for such niceties as "cheese" and the effect was magnified by huge contrasty blow-ups with every pore, blemish, and blood-shot eyeball exposed. In this way, he combined the instant horror of a passport photo with a shock value all his own."

Robin Muir has summed up his legacy: "His portraits still look starkly modern, half a century on. His street photographs are haunting documents too, a singular vision of three great cities. After two major retrospectives in London institutions, the Victoria & Albert Museum (1984) and the National Portrait Gallery (1996), and an entry in the Oxford Dictionary of National Biography, his place in the pantheon of twentieth century British photographers might be secured." Bruce Bernard wrote, at Deakin's first retrospective, that he was proud "to have had a part in doing our dear, witty and wayward friend some of the justice he so strenuously denied himself."

Deakin was the basis for the photographer Carl Castering in Colin Wilson's novel Ritual in the Dark. Deakin was played by actor Karl Johnson in John Maybury's biographical film about Francis Bacon, Love Is the Devil: Study for a Portrait of Francis Bacon.
