= After the Bath, Woman Drying Herself =

Pastel by Edgar Degas

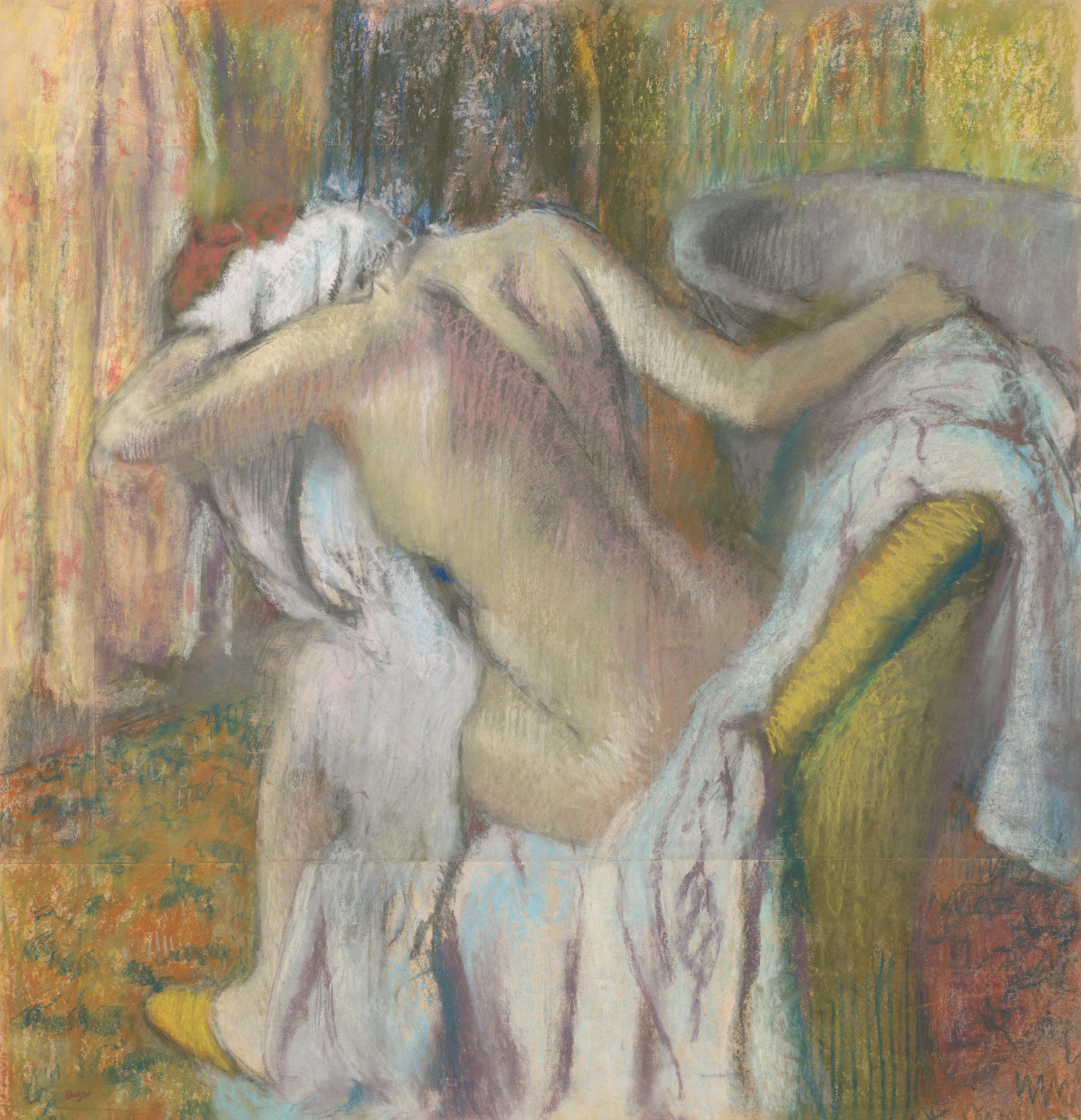
- Artist: Edgar Degas
- Year: 1890~95
- Medium: pastel on wove paper
- Dimensions: 103.5 cm × 98.5 cm (40.7 in × 38.8 in)
- Location: National Gallery, London

After the Bath, Woman Drying Herself is a pastel drawing by Edgar Degas, made between 1890 and 1895. Since 1959, it has been in the collection of the National Gallery, London. This work is one in a series of pastels and oils that Degas created depicting female nudes. Originally, Degas exhibited his works at Impressionist exhibitions in Paris, where he gained a loyal following.

Degas's nude works, including After the Bath, Woman Drying Herself, continue to spark controversy among art critics.

== Artwork ==
Edgar Degas often used photographs and sketches as a preliminary step, studying the light and the composition for his paintings. His use of light may be attributable to his deteriorating eyesight. Degas applied numerous pastel layers in After the Bath, Woman Drying Herself, making the woman appear somewhat translucent. The heavily worked pastel creates deep textures and blurred contours, emphasizing the figure's movement.

The work depicts a woman sitting on white towels spread over a wicker chair, with her back to the viewer. Her body is arched and slightly twisted, creating a tension in her back, accentuated by the deep line of her backbone. One hand dries her neck with a towel, presumably after the woman exited the tin bath in the corner of the room. The other arm holds onto the chair for support. The space is defined by the vertical and diagonal lines where the floor and walls meet.

=== Materials ===
The materials in the painting have been the subject of extensive technical analysis. Degas used a multitude of commercially available pastel crayons, many of which consisted of several individual pigments. Predominant pigments in this painting are Prussian blue, cadmium yellow and ochres. These beautiful, light colours perfectly embody the Impressionist ideals of the era. The drawing was made on several pieces of paper mounted on cardboard. Degas may have started with a smaller composition which he extended as he worked, requiring more paper. The artwork measures 103.5 × 98.5 centimetres (40.7 × 38.8 in).

== Background ==
The work is part of a series of photographs, preliminary sketches and completed works in pastels and oils by Degas from this period. The series depicts women dancing or bathing, some showing women in awkward or unnatural positions. The art historian Carol Armstrong argues that the series differs from the work of other artists depicting female nudity in the sense that Degas contorts women's bodies in unusual positions to make viewers uncomfortable. This discomfort causes viewers to avert their gaze to respect the privacy of the subject depicted in this highly vulnerable, exposing moment. Degas, speaking about these works, said, he intended to create a feeling in the viewer: "as if you looked through a keyhole." Degas is believed to have frequently documented the lives of Parisian women in brothels; therefore, he works to preserve their anonymity with the extensive use of shadows. This notion of "privacy and exclusion" of the subject parallels Degas's own desire to live a life in the shadows, hiding from the public and valuing his privacy. The woman's face is hidden, so the emphasis of the piece rests on the woman's nude body.

Degas included many works of female nudes bathing in the last Impressionist exhibition in 1886. Nine of Degas's pastel drawings of women at their bath were exhibited by Theo Van Gogh at Galerie Boussod et Valadon in 1888. After the Bath, Woman Drying Herself was shown at the Lefevre Gallery in 1950 and was bought for the collection of the National Gallery, London in 1959. A less highly worked example of a similar subject is in the Courtauld Gallery, and other works in the series are in many public museums.

Other similar postures

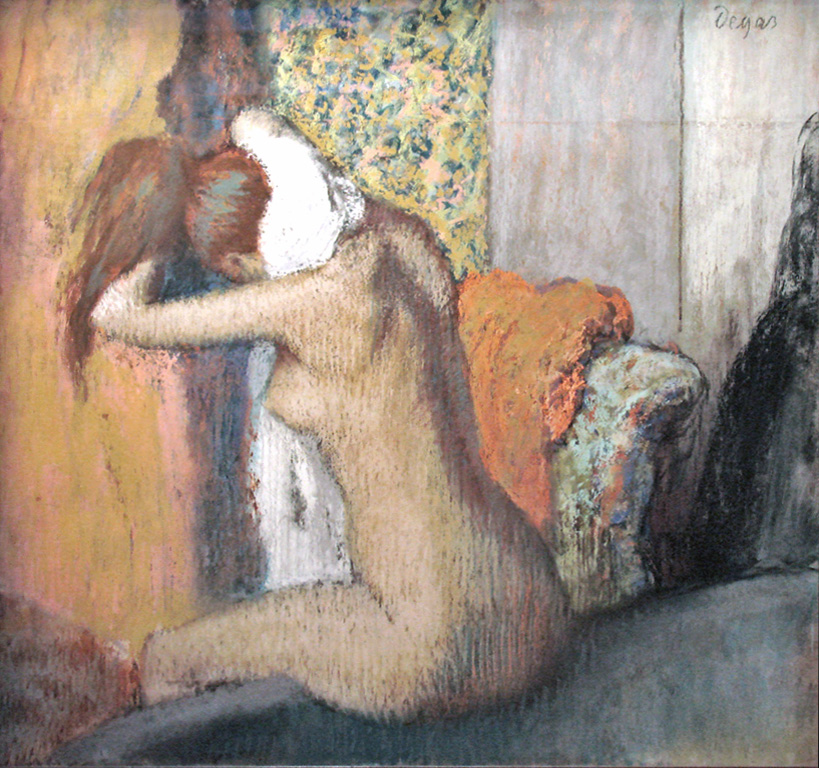
After The Bath, woman drying her neck (1895–1898) (Musée d'Orsay, Paris)

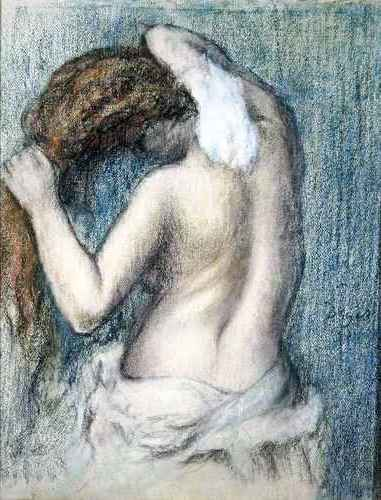
Woman Washing

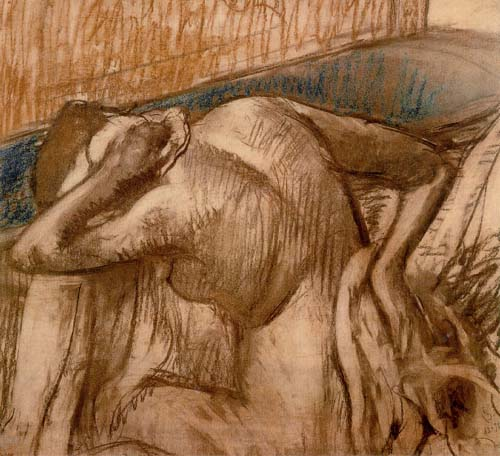
After The Bath, pastel and charcoal on paper.

== Influences ==
The work had a considerable influence on Francis Bacon, most noticeably on his triptychs Three Figures in a Room (1964, Centre Pompidou, Paris) and Three Studies of the Male Back (1970, Kunsthaus Zürich). The Tate Gallery says "For Bacon [it] was indeed something of a talisman. It epitomised Degas's approach to a larger obsession the two artists shared with the plasticity of the body, its potential for the most varied forms of articulation, in movement and repose." The work was one of three central nudes chosen by Bacon in his "The Artist's Choice" exhibition at the National Gallery in 1985, shown between Velázquez's Rokeby Venus and Michelangelo's Entombment. Art historian and curator Michael Peppiatt quoted Bacon thus: "I love Degas. I think his pastels are among the greatest things ever made. I think they're far greater than his paintings."

== Critical reception ==
Degas's candid portrayal of women in vulnerable states caused controversy among art critics. Some critics believed that works from Degas's Impressionist series, including After the Bath, Woman Drying Herself, were tactless in their depiction of the female nude. To them, these female nudes lacked any kind of idealisation, which deviated from the standard academic convention of portraying nude bodies in the most favourable light. Other critics, namely Octave Mirbeau, commended Degas for his bold break from the conventional artistic style of works at the Salon (Paris). He praised Degas for rejecting the temptation to portray these women in an unrealistically idealised light; which would have made his works more widely commercially successful in their unchallenging state of capitalising on the beauty of the female nude body.

Others critiqued Degas for his objectivity in portraying subjects, making his job scientific in nature rather than artistic. Degas captured extremely intimate moments with great precision and accuracy, choosing to not over-sexualise his subjects. Curator Richard Kendall believed that Degas's works were particularly special because they were so non-erotic in nature. This fuelled Carol Armstrong's point that the nude bodies were meant to exist "in a world of their own" and were not meant to be sexualised by the viewer. Degas's work, After the Bath, Woman Drying Herself, served as a prime example of Degas's controversial style of depicting female nudity.
