= Wieland Schmied =

Austrian art historian and critic, curator, literary scholar and writer

Wieland Schmied (5 February 1929 – 22 April 2014) was an Austrian art historian and critic, curator, literary scholar and writer. He was professor of art history at the Academy of Fine Arts, Munich since 1986 and its rector from 1988 until 1993. He was president of the Bayerische Akademie der Schönen Künste from 1995 to 2004.

He was born in Frankfurt am Main, Germany, in 1929, the eldest son of the Austrian philosopher Walther Schmied-Kowarzik and his second wife. The German philosopher Wolfdietrich Schmied-Kowarzik is his younger brother. He grew up in Frankfurt am Main and Friedberg, before moving to Vienna with his parents in 1939. Following the Matura of his secondary schooling in Mödling, he studied law at the University of Vienna. He became an Austrian citizen in 1949.

As director of the Kestnergesellschaft, Hannover, Schmied organized a total of 99 exhibitions, for whose exhibition catalogues he wrote numerous forewords and other contributions. In Berlin he curated many important international exhibitions on 20th century art. In 1977, he was responsible for the drawings department at the documenta 6 in Kassel, and continued to head the department "Neue Sachlichkeit und Surrealismus" at the 15th European Art Exhibition in Berlin. For the Goethe Institute, with Eberhard Kolb and Eberhard Roters, he curated an exhibition on visual art of the early Weimar Republic.

Schmied died on 22 April 2014 in Vorchdorf, Upper Austria.
