= Study for a Self-Portrait—Triptych, 1985–86 =

Painting by Francis Bacon

Study for a Self-Portrait—Triptych, 1985–86. Oil on canvas, each panel 198cm x 147.5cm. Marlborough Fine Art, London

Study for a Self-Portrait—Triptych, 1985–86 is a triptych painted between 1985 and 1986 by the Irish-born English artist Francis Bacon. It is a brutally honest examination of the effect of age and time on the human body and spirit and was painted in the aftermath of the deaths of many of his close friends. It is Bacon's only full-length self-portrait, and was described by art critic David Sylvester as "grand, stark, ascetic".

The triptych is widely considered a masterpiece and one of Bacon's most personal works, but is one of his least experimental and most conventional paintings. Bacon believed that the fatigue of old age and the complications of fame led him to appreciate simplicity as a virtue of its own, a sentiment which he attempted to transfer into his work.

== Description ==
The painting is built up from very even and smooth brush strokes, using mostly brown, cream, white and black colours, except around the faces. Bacon is ill-at-ease in each panel, seated cross-legged with his hands around his knees, though in the centre panel, one arm rests on the chair arm. The descriptions are based on passport photographs; he never used a mirror for these works, claiming that he hated the sight of his own face, especially close up, and more as he got older. This is reflected in the current work; in the left and centre panels, large parts of his head have disintegrated or are missing. He explained to Sylvester that he continued "painting it [his face] because I haven't any other people to do...One of the nicest things Jean Cocteau said was 'each day in the mirror I watch death at work.' That is what one does to oneself".

== Themes ==
Self-Portrait, 1973

Several of Bacon's closest friends had died in the years before he began the triptych, and their loss is evident in the triptych's sorrowful, mournful atmosphere. In 1979 Muriel Belcher, proprietor of Soho's Colony Room, died and in 1981 Bacon's youngest sister Winifred died. During the 1970s, he lost many of his friends, including his long-term lover George Dyer. In an interview with Sylvester in the early 1980s, Bacon admitted his friends had been "dying around me like flies and I've had nobody else to paint but myself ... I loathe my own face, and I've done self-portraits because I've had nothing else to do".

Formally, the work departs from Bacon's usual style, but in many ways, it can be considered as an extension of themes explored in his early-1970s Black Triptychs. It may be more symmetrically refined, not as raw and has smoother edges, while it places the figures more centrally; previous triptychs typically positioned the figures unequally, typically slightly towards the edges so as to unnerve the viewer. The three panels share a cool, light-brown surface, while the figures are unusually diminished in size. Before this work, his heads were characterised by broad, almost wanton, brushstrokes. There were even instances, notably in his mid-1960s portraits of Lucian Freud, where the whole head was depicted with a single stroke. In the 1985 triptych, he abandons that approach, building the self-portraits from tight and very fine brush strokes. Instead, Bacon chooses to focus on disintegration; the skulls are blood-spattered, with bone and blood flying out of them.

Study for a Self-Portrait continues a painterly motif that Bacon began early in his career: a spatially uniform and simple background (although the back line is curved in the centre panel, a device generally only seen in much later work). Here, the figures are held together by pairs of vertical blinds in the background of each frame. In contrast to most of Bacon's work, this background references contemporary art, drawing on the stillness of Barnett Newman's Voice (1950), while the elegance of the figures echoes Henri Matisse's Music.

While Bacon's earlier work often hid the figures behind veils or other concealing devices, the 1985 triptych leaves nothing hidden. His mid-career reduced portraits of friends to broad brush strokes cast with an almost drunken abandon, but the 1985 triptych is precise and reduced. In this respect, the triptych can be read as the artist retreating into the academic finesse against which he once raged. The technique also evokes the background details of his seminal early-1970s Black Triptych series.

== See also ==
- List of paintings by Francis Bacon

== Sources ==
- Farr, Dennis; Peppiatt, Michael; Yard, Sally. Francis Bacon: A Retrospective, 1999. Harry N Abrams. ISBN 0-8109-2925-2
- Peppiatt, Michael. Francis Bacon: Anatomy of an Enigma. London: Weidenfeld & Nicolson, 1996. ISBN 0-297-81616-0
- Schmied, Wieland. Francis Bacon: Commitment and Conflict. Munich: Prestel, 1996. ISBN 3-7913-1664-8
- Sylvester, David. The Brutality of Fact: Interviews With Francis Bacon. London: Thames and Hudson, 1987. ISBN 0-500-27475-4
- Sylvester, David. Looking back at Francis Bacon. London: Thames and Hudson, 2000. ISBN 0-500-01994-0
- Zweite, Armin (ed). The Violence of the Real. London: Thames and Hudson, 2006. ISBN 0-500-09335-0
