= Three Studies of Lucian Freud =

1969 oil painting by Francis Bacon

- Artist: Francis Bacon
- Year: 1969
- Medium: Oil on canvas
- Subject: Lucian Freud
- Dimensions: 198 cm × 147.5 cm (78 in × 58 in); for each canvas
- Location: Los Angeles County Museum of Art

Three Studies of Lucian Freud is a 1969 oil-on-canvas triptych by the Irish-born British painter Francis Bacon, depicting artist Lucian Freud. It was sold in November 2013 for US$142.4 million, which at the time was the highest price attained at auction for a work of art when not factoring in inflation. That record was surpassed in May 2015 by "Version O" (1955) of Pablo Picasso's 1950s Les Femmes d'Alger series.

== Background ==
Bacon and Freud were friends but artistic rivals. Introduced in 1945 by artist Graham Sutherland, they swiftly became close friends who met frequently. The two artists painted each other several times, starting in 1951, when Freud first sat for Bacon. Two full-length triptychs of Freud by Bacon resulted. Three Studies of Lucian Freud is the later of the two; the first one, created in 1966, has not been seen since 1992. They form part of a series of large triptych portraits of Bacon's friends painted in the 1960s; other subjects include Isabel Rawsthorne, Muriel Belcher and his (Bacon's) partner George Dyer. Bacon and Freud's friendship ended after an argument in the mid-1970s.

== Description ==
All three panels, in Bacon's typical abstract, distorted, isolated style, show Freud sitting on a cane-bottomed wooden chair within a cage, on a curved mottled-brown surface with a solid orange background. Behind each figure is a headboard of a bed, originating in a set of photographs of Freud by John Deakin which Bacon used as a reference. Michael Peppiatt writes "Trapped here in a series of Baconian cages, a contorted Freud hovers from panel to panel like a coiled spring about to shoot out of the flat, airless picture plane." The central panel portrays the figure face on, in a pose similar to that Bacon used for George Dyer, his lover. Brett Gorvy of Christie's considers the work to represent "a marriage of the incredibly important people in Bacon's life." The three canvases of the triptych are the same size and are each individually framed. The colouring is brighter than is typical of Bacon's works.

Francis Outred of Christie's describes the 1969 triptych as "a true masterpiece" and "an undeniable icon of 20th Century art" which "marks Bacon and Freud's relationship, paying tribute to the creative and emotional kinship between the two artists." Art historian Ben Street describes the work as "not an A-grade Bacon." It was among Bacon's favourites of his works.

== History ==
The triptych was painted in 1969 at the Royal College of Art in London, where Bacon had a large enough studio to work on three adjacent canvases simultaneously. It was first exhibited in 1970 at the Galleria d'Arte Galatea in Turin, and then was included in a retrospective at the Grand Palais in Paris and the Kunsthalle Düsseldorf in 1971–72. The three panels of the triptych were sold separately in the mid-1970s. Bacon was unhappy that the panels had been split up, writing on a photograph of the left-hand panel that it was "meaningless unless it is united with the other two panels." The panels were held by different collectors until the late 1980s, when one of the original purchasers, a collector from Rome named in some sources as Francesco De Simone Niquesa, reassembled the work. The reassembled triptych was exhibited in the US, at the Yale Center for British Art, New Haven, Connecticut, in 1999, but the entire work was not exhibited in the UK until October 2013.

On 12 November 2013, the triptych sold for US$142.4 million (including the buyer's premium) to Elaine Wynn at Christie's New York auction house, nominally becoming the most expensive work of art ever to be sold at auction. When inflation is taken into account, a higher price was reached at the same auction house for Van Gogh's Portrait of Dr. Gachet, which in 1990 sold for $203 million current dollars. Bacon's triptych did surpass the constant dollar record of $119.9 million set by the fourth version of Edvard Munch's The Scream in May 2012. The 2013 sale also represents the highest price paid for a work by a British or Irish artist, beating Bacon's Triptych 1976, which fetched $86.3 million in May 2008.

In September 2025, Wynn's family announced that the Los Angeles County Museum of Art, where Wynn was board co-chair from 2015 until her death, would receive the painting. It would be the first Bacon work to enter LACMA’s collection.

== See also ==
- Triptychs by Francis Bacon
