= David Sylvester =

British art critic and author

Anthony David Bernard Sylvester CBE (21 September 1924 – 19 June 2001) was a British art critic and curator. Although he received no formal education in the arts, during his long career he was influential in promoting modern artists, in particular Francis Bacon, Joan Miró, and Lucian Freud.

== Life and career ==
Born in London, his father was a Russian-Jewish antiques dealer. Sylvester had trouble as a student at University College School and was thrown out of the family home. He wrote for the paper Tribune and went to Paris in 1947 where he met Alberto Giacometti, one of the strongest influences on him.

Sylvester is credited with coining the term kitchen sink originally to describe a strand of post-war British painting typified by John Bratby. Sylvester used the phrase negatively but it was widely applied to other art forms including literature and theatre.

During the 1950s, Sylvester worked with Henry Moore, Freud and Bacon but also supported Richard Hamilton and the other "Young Turks" of British pop art. This led him to become a prominent media figure in the 1960s. During the 1960s and 1970s Sylvester occupied a number of roles at the Arts Council of Great Britain serving on advisory panels and on the main panel. He was also a trustee of the Tate Gallery, among a number of such positions. In 1969, he curated a Renoir exhibition at the Hayward Gallery for which he was assisted by a young Nicholas Serota. During the 1970s, he became interested in and collected early oriental carpets. and in 1983, he co-curated (with Donald King of the Victoria and Albert Museum) an exhibition, The Eastern Carpet in the Western World, at the Hayward Gallery.

Sylvester was awarded a Golden Lion at the 1993 Venice Biennale for curating an exhibition of Francis Bacon's work. He was married to Pamela Briddon (three daughters; marriage dissolved). He was also the father of the artist Cecily Brown with the writer Shena Mackay.

== Books ==
- King, Donald and Sylvester, David eds. The Eastern Carpet in the Western World, From the 15th to the 17th century, Arts Council of Great Britain, London, 1983, ISBN 0-7287-0362-9
- David Sylvester "Interviste con artisti americani" Castelvecchi editore, 2012
- Sylvester, David (2002). Memoirs of a pet lamb. London: Chatto & Windus. ISBN 0701173343.
- Sylvester, David (2001). Interviews with American artists. London: Chatto & Windus. ISBN 070116266X.
- Sylvester, David (2001). About modern art (2nd ed.). New Haven [Conn.]: Yale University Press. ISBN 0300092024.
- Sylvester, David [curated by] (1997). Francis Bacon: The human body. London: Hayward Gallery. ISBN 1853321753.
- Sylvester, David (1988). The brutality of fact : interviews with Francis Bacon (3rd enl. ed.). New York, N.Y.: Thames and Hudson. ISBN 0500274754.
- Sylvester, David, ed. (1992). René Magritte : catalogue raisonné. Paris: Flammarion [u.a.] ISBN 9782080125071.
- Sylvester, David; with texts by Philip French, Christopher Frayling, Ken (1999). Moonraker, Strangelove and other celluloid dreams : the visionary art of Ken Adam. London: Serpentine Gallery. ISBN 1870814274.
- Serota, Nicholas, intro; Sylvester, David (extracts from his writings) (2002). Looking at modern art : in memory of David Sylvester; [published to accompany an exhibition at Tate Modern, 17 January - 24 March 2002]. London: Tate Publ. ISBN 978-1854374325.
- Sylvester, David (1996). Jasper Johns flags, 1955-1994. London: Anthony d'Offay Gallery. ISBN 0947564705.
- Sylvester, David (1995). Looking at Giacometti (Pimlico ed.). London: Pimlico. ISBN 978-0712674614.
