= List of parks in Haikou =

This is a list of the main parks in Haikou, Hainan, China. There are six major parks in the city as well as numerous smaller parks.

== Baishamen Park ==
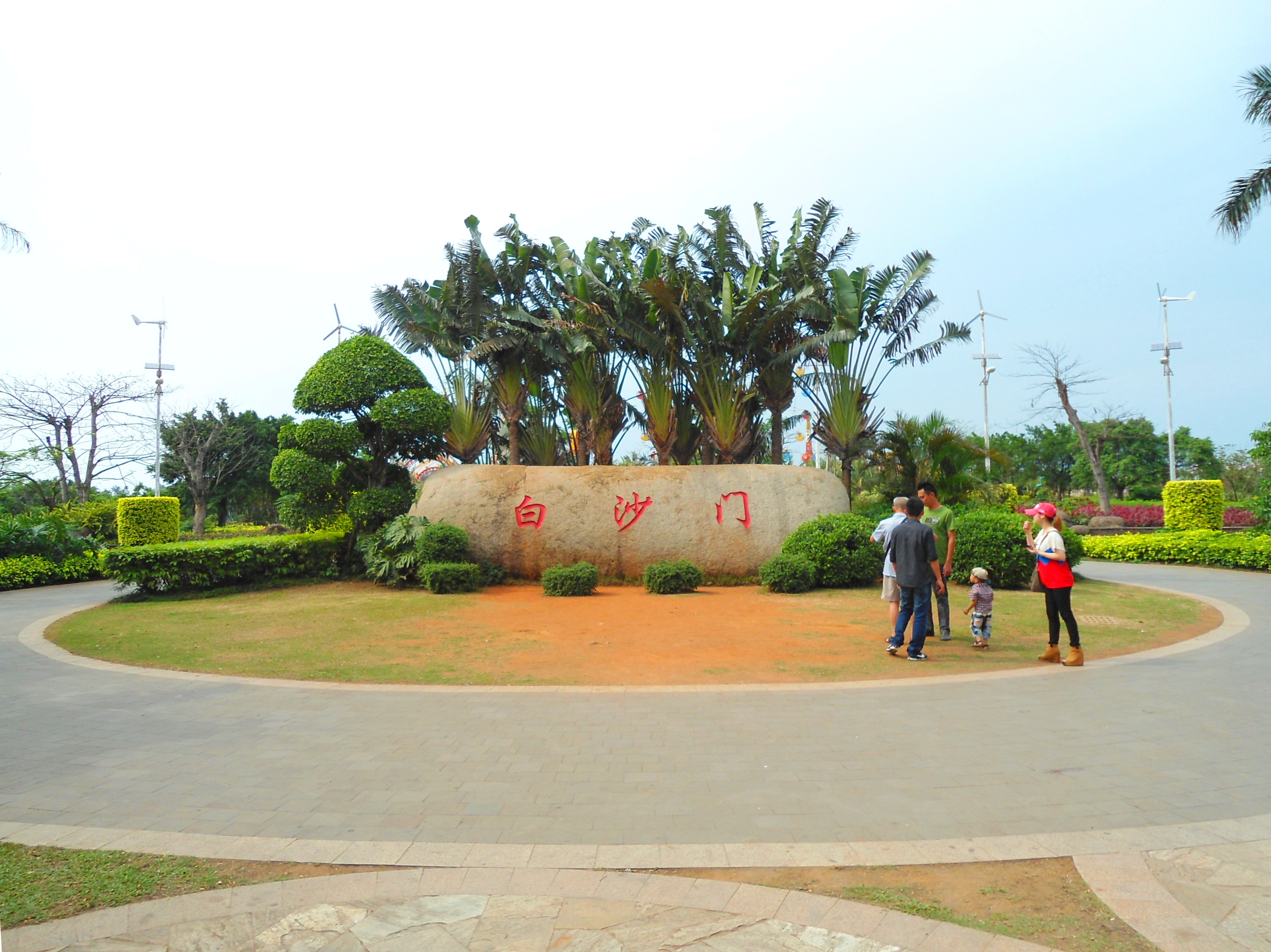
Baishamen Park

Baishamen Park is located at the north shore of Haidian Island. This is one of the most-visited parks in the city.

It contains a small amusement park, a beach, and a short shopping street. There is a small lake in the centre with rental paddleboats. It is a fairly new park, being opened in January 2009. The total area is 60 hectares.

== Binhai Park ==
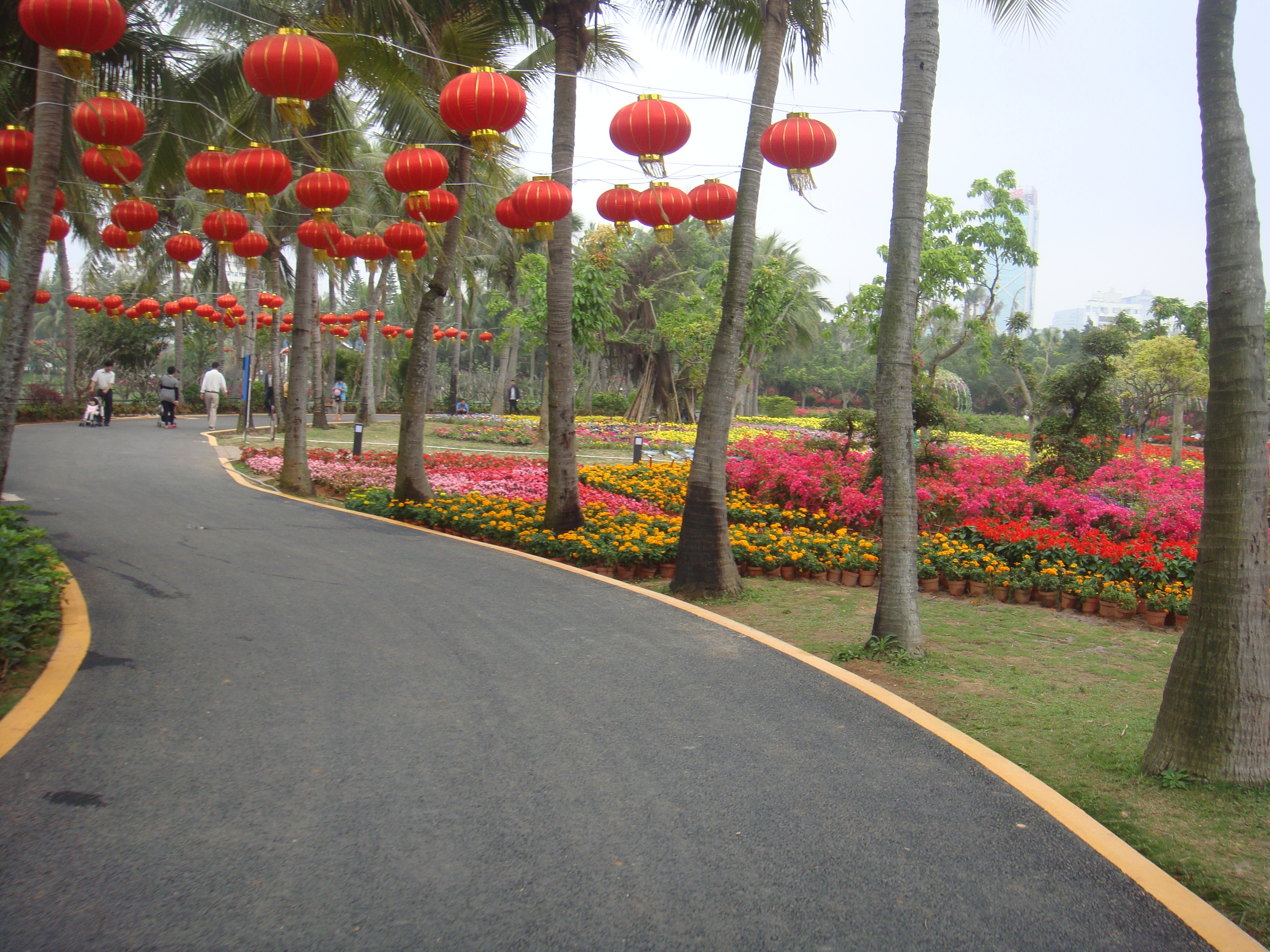
Binhai Park

Binhai Park is named after Binhai Road, a main road which is its southern border. It is home to a large, bougainvillea hybrid exhibition each year. This park has a small lake and building used for community purposes in the middle. It is a well-maintained park with numerous walking paths, flower beds, and plenty of tree cover.

This park was once an amusement park. It was then turned into a park and called Hainan (Haikou) Youth Technology Park. Around 2015 to 2016 it was renovated again and named Binhai Park.

== Century Park ==
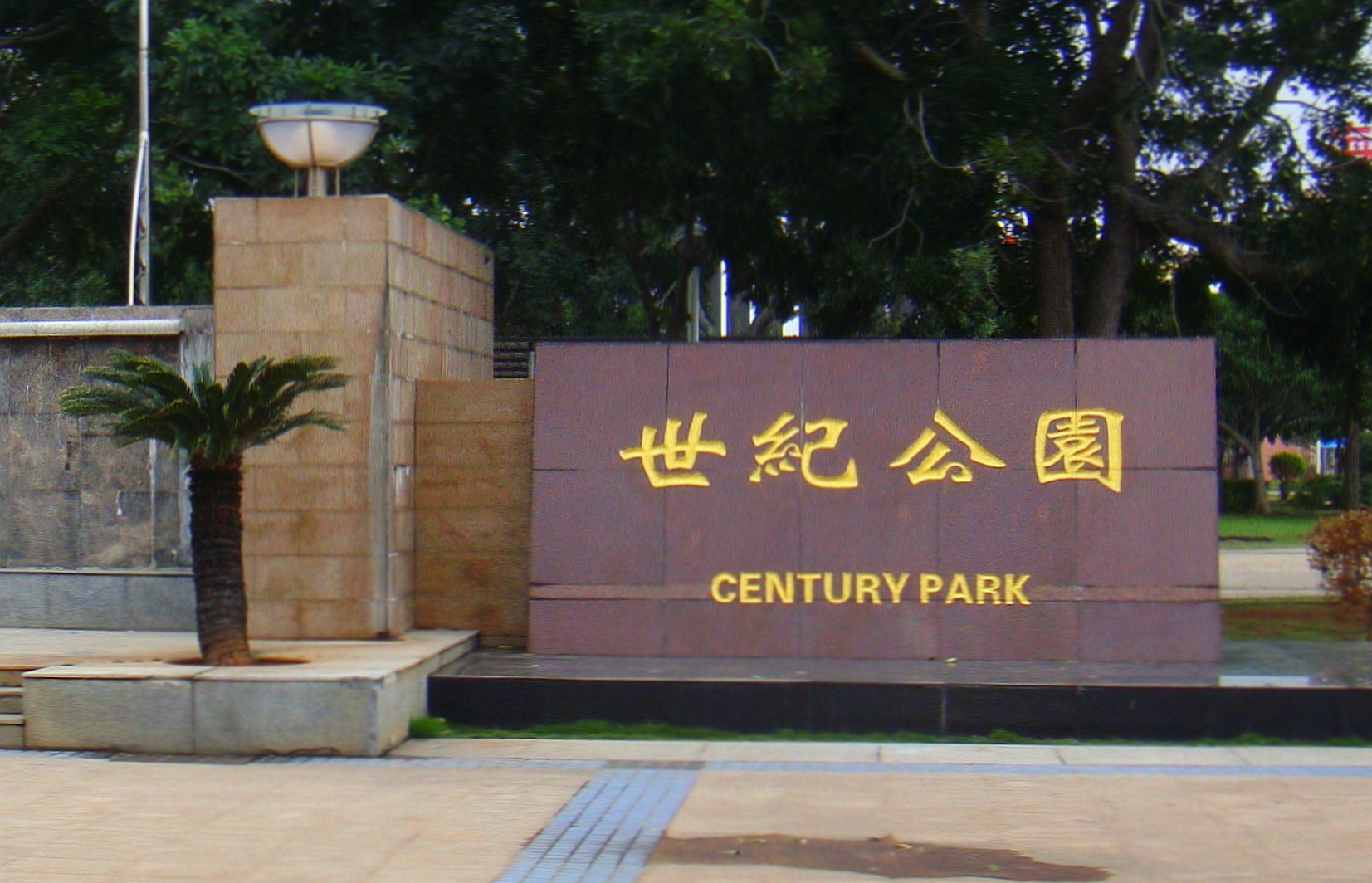
Century Park

Century Park was created in 2013. It consists of a large, open, brick-covered area at the west, and grassy areas in the middle and east. Century Bridge passes over it.

== Changying Global 100 Fantasty Park ==
The Changying Global 100 Fantasty Park is an under-construction amusement park located around 12 km west of downtown Haikou, and around 7 km south of Haikou's west coast area.

== Evergreen Park ==
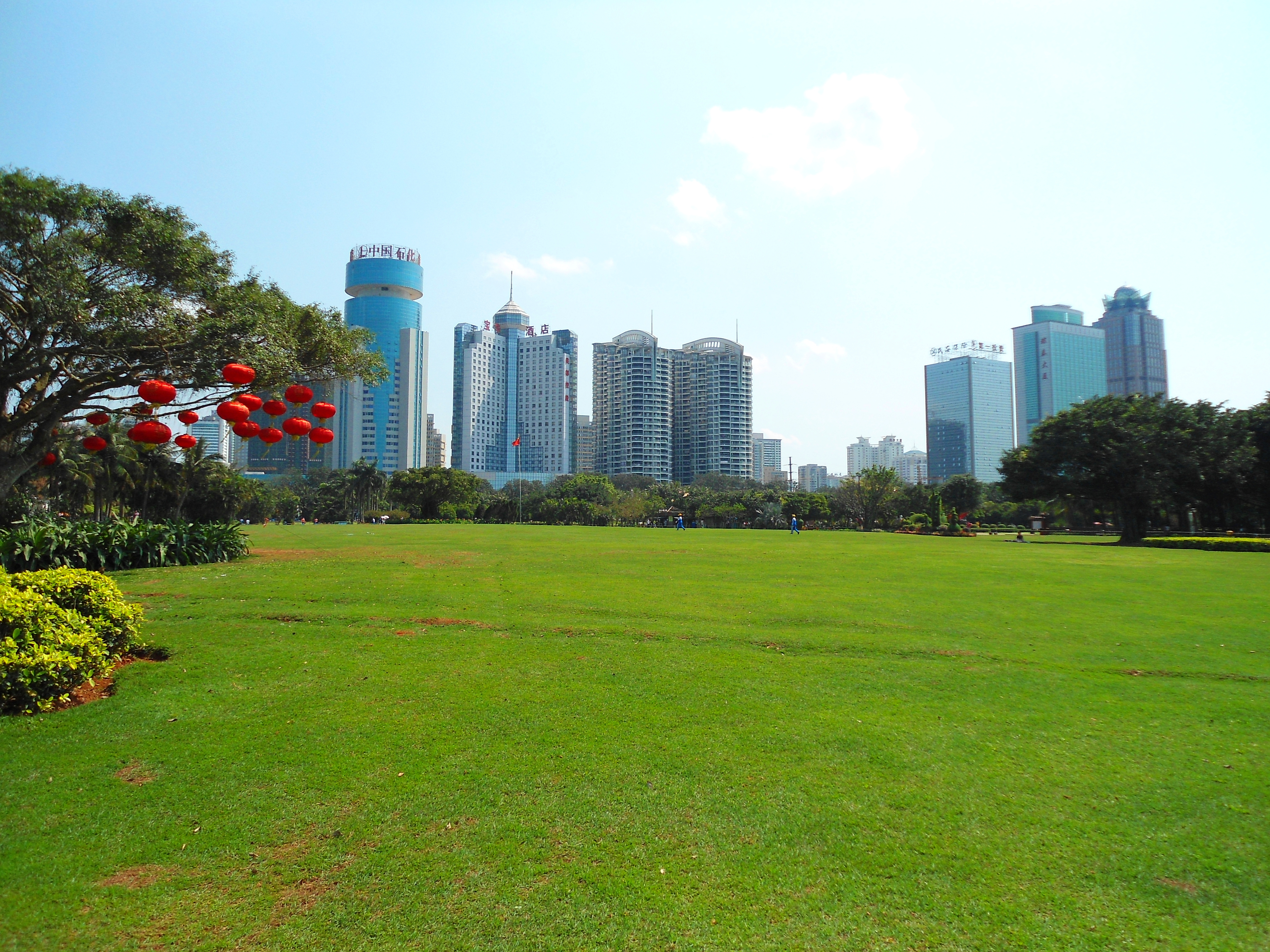
Evergreen Park

Evergreen Park is a large park on the north shore of the main part of Haikou. It is located on Binhai Road. It is used for cultural events and is a popular place for flying kites.

A lake in the middle of the park has rental paddleboats. There are numerous jogging paths within the park. The west side has two outdoor restaurants. On the east side, south of the amusement park eastern park, there is the Haikou Great Hall of the People which hosts sporting events and product conventions. East of that is a lagoon.

This park has a small amusement park and food street at the east side. This is one of the most-visited parks in the city. It receives large crowds on weekends.

== Golden Bull Mountain Ridge Park ==
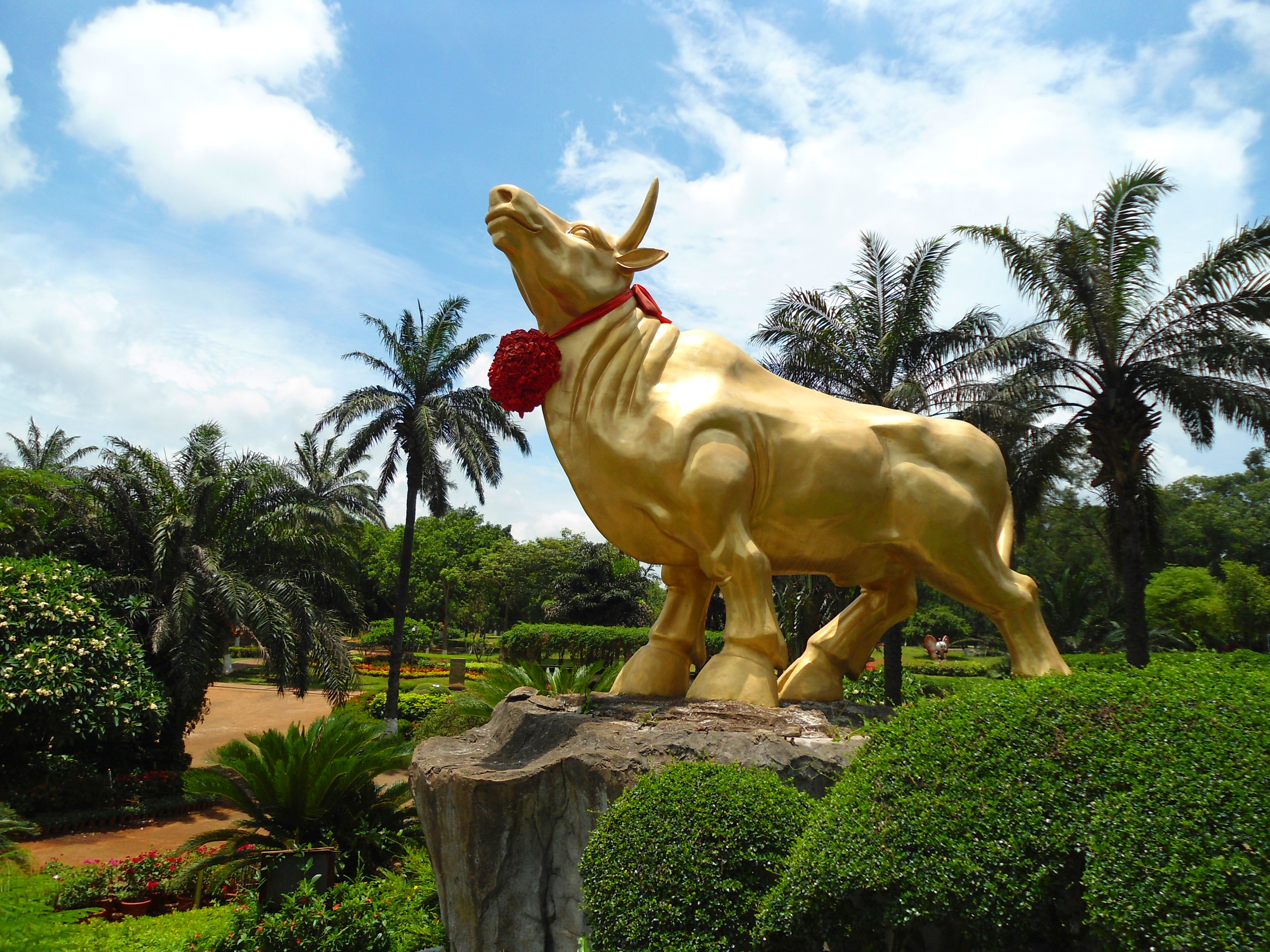
Golden Bull Mountain Ridge Park

Golden Bull Mountain Ridge Park contains a large number of tree species and a bamboo forest. The park was built on a hill. At the top, there is a zoo and dove aviary.

Near the top, the Battle of the Liberation on Hainan Island Martyrs Cemetery is situated.

This park has a large lake at the east side with a small island.

== Hainan International Friendship Park ==
Hainan International Friendship Park is essentially a long strip of grass.

== Meishe River National Wetland Park ==
The Meishe River National Wetland Park is an eco-park on the banks for the Meishe River.

== People's Park ==
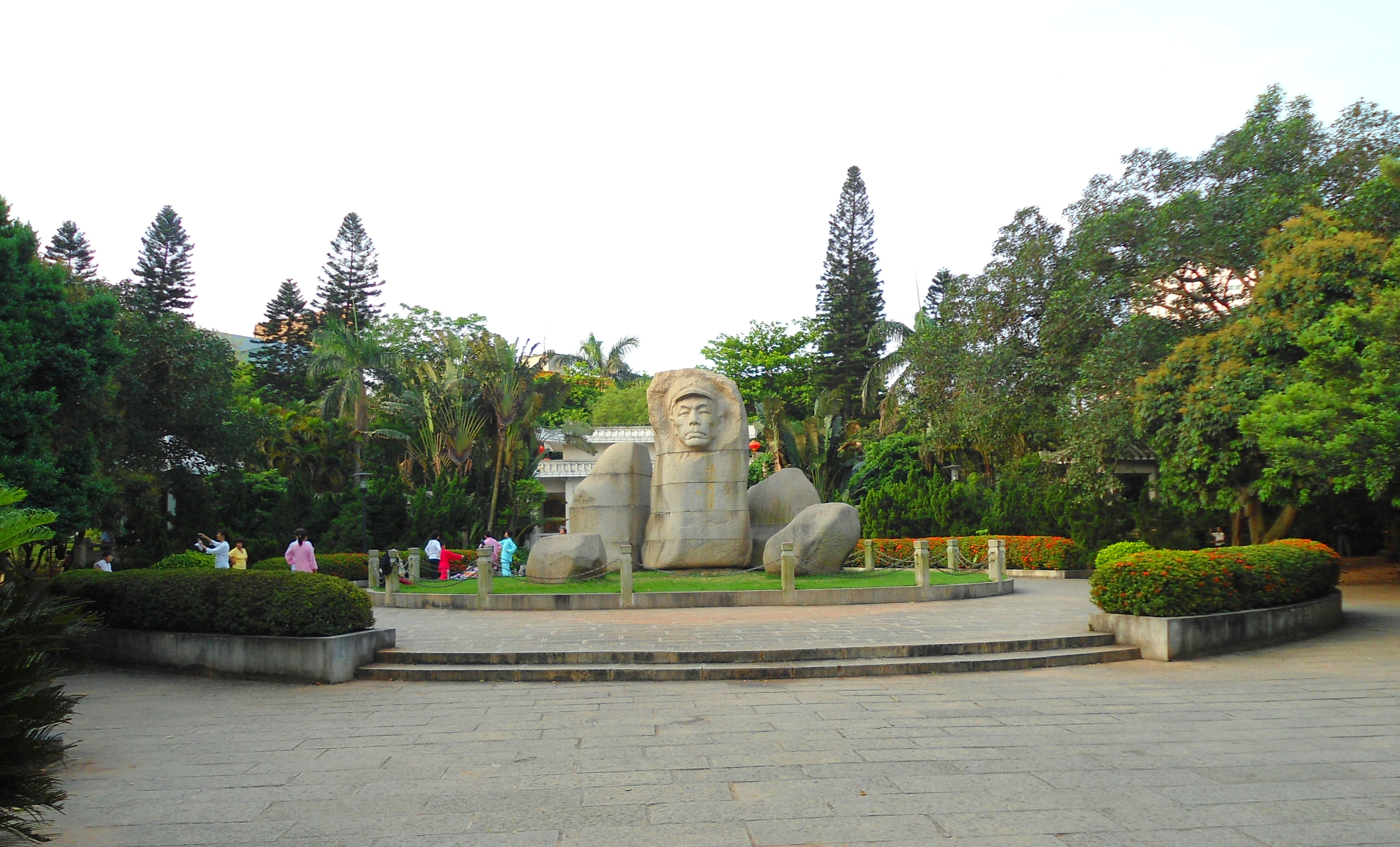
People's Park

People's Park is an old park in the centre of the city, south of the Bo'ai Road area. It has a monument to Feng Baiju. It is built on a hill and is popular with seniors for dancing and leisure activities. It has a large amount of tree cover. The park contains many features and amenities, including:

- Ping pong area with several tables
- Public bathrooms
- Convenience store
- Police outpost
- Exercise equipment
- Gateball area
