= Battle of Hainan Island =

1950 battle of the Chinese Civil War

- Part of the Chinese Civil War
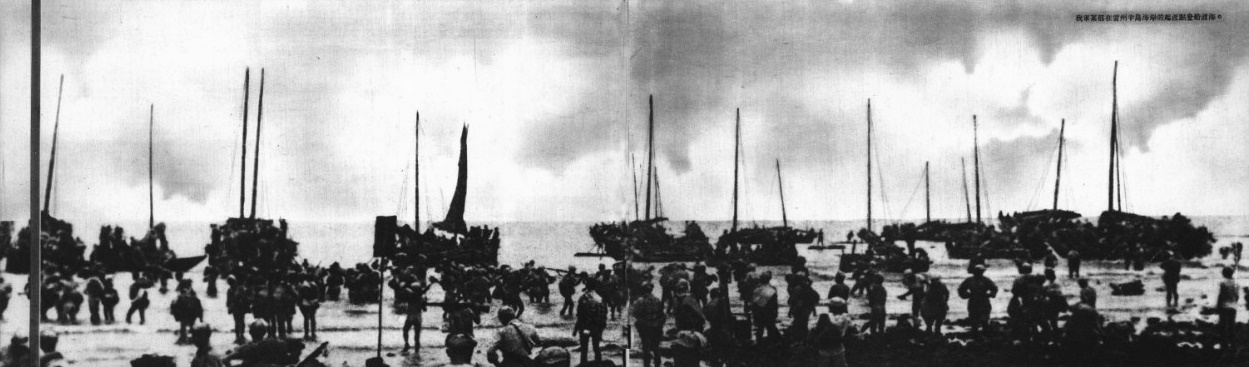
- PLA junks preparing to cross the Qiongzhou Strait
Date	16 April – 1 May 1950 (2 weeks and 1 day)
Location	Hainan
Result	People's Republic of China victory
Territorial changes	People's Republic of China captures Hainan

Belligerents
Republic of China	People's Republic of China

Commanders and leaders
Xue Yue	Deng Hua; Wang Guoxing

Units involved
2nd Marine Brigade; 4th Regiment	PLA Fourth Field Army; 15th Corps; Hainan Independent Column

Strength
140,000–200,000 soldiers and militiamen; 50 ships; 25 aircraft	

Casualties and losses
	4,000 casualties

The Battle of Hainan Island (simplified Chinese: 海南岛战役; traditional Chinese: 海南島戰役) occurred in 1950, during the final phase of the Chinese Civil War. The People's Republic of China (PRC) conducted an amphibious assault on Hainan Island on 16 April, assisted by the Hainan communist movement which controlled much of the island's interior, while the Republic of China (ROC) controlled the coast; their forces were concentrated in the north near Haikou and were forced to retreat south after the landings. The communists secured Hainan's southern cities by the end of the month and declared victory on 1 May.

== Background ==
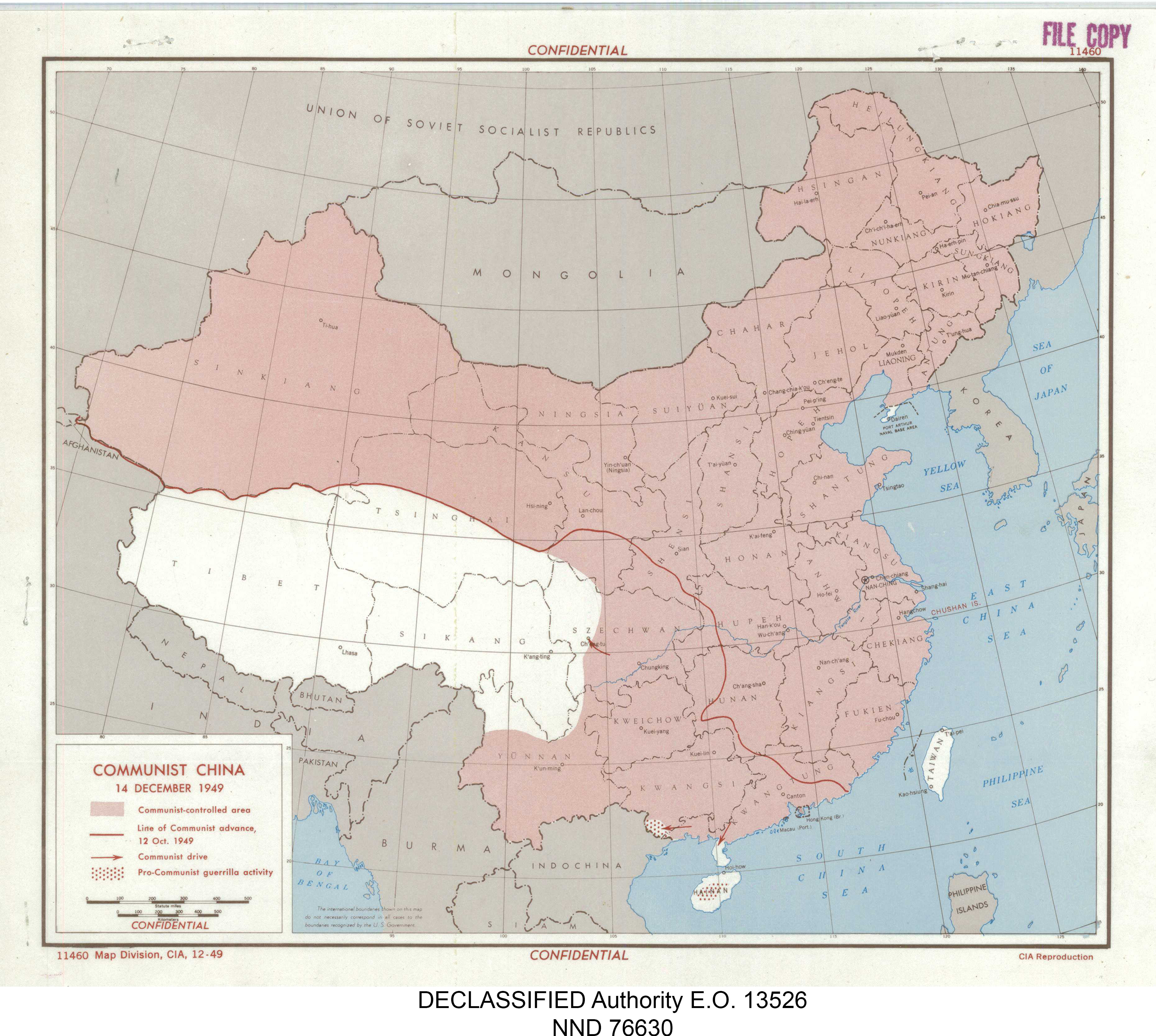
As of December 1949, the Chinese Communists had controlled the entire mainland China except Hainan and de facto country Tibet. (CIA map)

Location of Hainan island with respect to mainland China

=== Hainan communist movement ===
The Chinese Communist Party (CCP) established a branch on Hainan in 1926. Lines of communication between the branch and the CCP leadership were tenuous from the beginning, resulting in the Hainan communist movement developing independently and operating with minimal outside support. The Hainan communists were hard hit by the ROC's repression that followed the end of the First United Front. The Hainan communists were nearly destroyed due to the confined geography of the island; like their mainland counterparts, the few survivors abandoned the urban coast for the rural interior. In 1929, Wang Wenming, leader of the Hainan communists, named Feng Baiju as his successor.

The communists and ROC created a Second United Front in response to Japanese aggression; formal arrangements for Hainan were only made in 1938 after the start of the Second Sino-Japanese War. The Hainan communists were further isolated by the Japanese invasion of the island in 1939 – they had little communication, and no radio contact, with the CCP leadership until the end of the war. Limited hostilities between the Hainan communists and ROC resumed in 1940. The Hainan communists formed a militia called the Hainan Independent Column (HIC). The ROC meanwhile alienated the indigenous Hlai people of the southern interior mountains by occupying Hlai territory and demanding materiel support. In July 1943, the Hlai – led by Wang Guoxing and Wang Yujin – attacked the ROC in the Baisha Uprising. The Hlai were crushed and suffered ROC reprisals. Wang Guoxing and Wang Yujin survived. On Wang Yujin's suggestion, the Hlai formed an alliance with the communists, who were based in the northern interior. The communists relied heavily on the Hlai for survival, and their main base shifted south to Wuzhishan in 1943–1944.

The civil war intensified after the end of the Second World War in 1945. On Hainan, the ROC left Hlai territory and reestablished themselves along the coast. The Hainan communists used access to Hlai territory to grow within the ROC blockade. Maintaining communications with the mainland CCP remained difficult. CCP orders to abandon the island in 1946 were rejected by the Hainan communists, who spent the years following the Japanese withdrawal building popular support.

=== Communist preparations ===
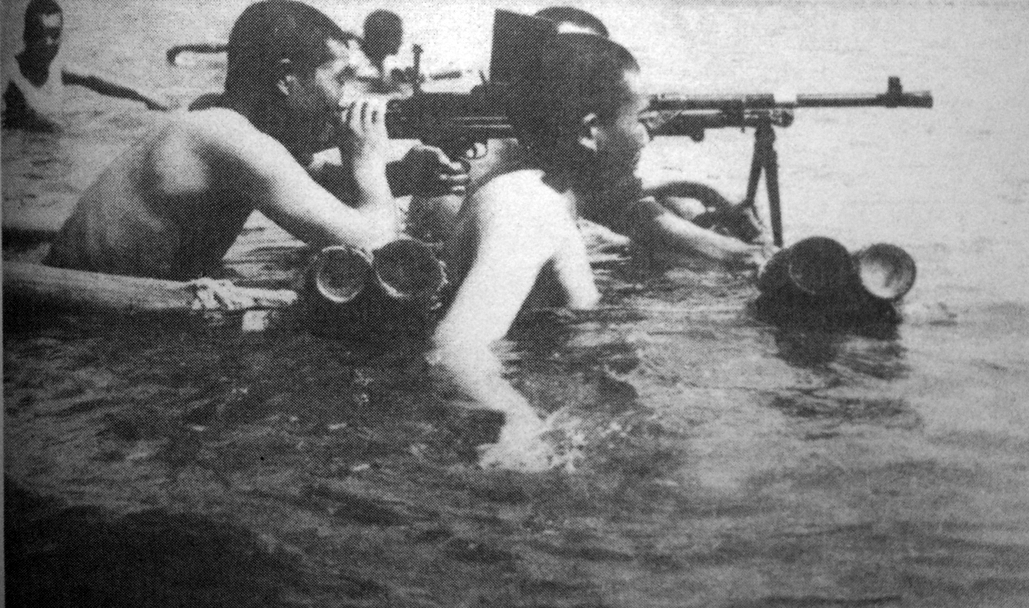
PLA soldiers training for the offensive in 1949

By late 1949, the PRC was looking forward to finishing the war by capturing the islands constituting the ROC's remaining strongholds. These tasks were difficult as the ROC retained superior naval and air forces; the communist navy only began to form in the summer with the capture of ROC ships. The PRC was unprepared; the invasions of the islands of Kinmen in October and Dengbu in November failed. The invasion of Hainan was deferred. In January 1950, Mao Zedong approved the invasion while in the Soviet Union for a state visit; he likely sought a victory to impress his hosts.

The Fourth Field Army of the People's Liberation Army (PLA) was tasked with the invasion. It was deployed to the Leizhou Peninsula in Guangdong, across the Qiongzhou Strait from Hainan. The subordinate 15th Corps, led by General Deng Hua, would participate in the cross-strait invasion. The defeat at Kinmen led to greater preparations.

Planning for the invasion occurred in the winter of 1949–1950. Wang Guoxing and Ma Baishan travelled through ROC-held territory to communist-held Beijing in the fall of 1949; they were in the city for the proclamation of the People's Republic of China. The Hainan delegation conferred with the PRC's military leadership before returning south in the wake of the PRC's advance. They arrived in time to attend the final invasion planning meeting in February 1950 which was attended by both Hainanese and PLA officers. Ma relayed Feng's suggestion that the attack from the north be made of pincer movements rather than a frontal assault on – and battle of attrition for – Haikou.

The Communist Southern Branch Party Bureau ordered the HIC to prepare and distribute currency in preparation for the PRC's invasion of Hainan. The currency would be issued to invading PLA troops to purchase supplies on Hainan; the wider distribution and usage would help tie the island to the PRC's economy. The HIC responded by issuing war bonds in the winter and spring of 1949–1950; this instigated a final suppression campaign by the ROC. Chen Jitang, the ROC governor of Hainan, also attempted to issue currency around the same time; this failed in part due to a lack of support from the ROC government.

The invasion was preceded by three months of training with Soviet assistance. Training included swimming and the operation of sail and motor boats.

The invasion was postponed by a few weeks on Soviet advice, who believed the winds would then be more favourable for junks. On the other hand, the main landings in April and May were unable to take advantage of favourable winter winds.

=== Nationalist preparations ===
ROC forces included perhaps 200,000 regular troops and militiamen. Seymour Topping from The New York Times reported 140,000 troops, including 80,000 veterans. Many had been evacuated from the mainland and were demoralized and poorly supplied; they were also accompanied by refugees. Most of the defenders were concentrated around Haikou. The ROC air force and navy were better equipped than the communists, with 25 warplanes and 50 military ships.

General Xue Yue was assigned to defend Hainan in late 1949. He launched a suppression campaign in early 1950; the Hainan communists were "devastated" in February but not eliminated.

The ROC government concentrated on defending Taiwan and denied most requests for reinforcement and material.

== Invasion ==
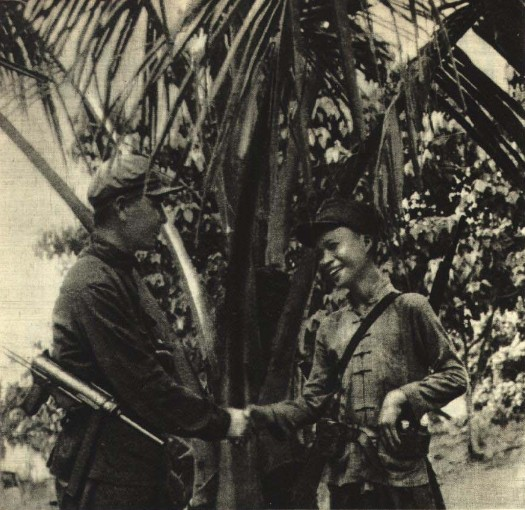
A PLA soldier (left) shakes hands with an HIC soldier (right), shortly after their forces' joint capture of Haikou.

=== Preliminary attacks ===
In the months leading up to the main landings, the PLA conducted preparatory activities to degrade the defences and prepare the HIC. The ROC Air Force attacked communist bases on the Leizhou Peninsula and Hainan with impunity; communist coastal anti‑air defences were weak or absent.

From late February 1950, the PLA executed probing operations across the Qiongzhou Strait with covert small-scale amphibious landings; the landings, using dozens of junks and small craft landings, were dispersed and frequently evaded ROC detection. According to one account, larger waves occurred on 10, 26 and 31 March to reinforce the HIC and secure staging areas for the main assault.

=== Main landings ===
The main communist amphibious assault started on the night of 16 April. The troops crossed in 318 junks divided into multiple waves. A number of transports were sunk by the ROC air force and navy. Most of the campaign's 4,000 communist casualties occurred during the initial crossing.

Once ashore, PLA forces advanced inland and linked up with the HIC guerillas. The HIC already controlled large interior areas and assisted by guiding landing forces, securing routes, and disrupting ROC rear areas. Haikou in the north fell on 23 April.

The ROC defence disintegrated from disunity of command and lack of supplies. Morale collapsed. They retreated southwards pursued by the communists. The ROC evacuated commanders and nearly 70,000 troops and refugees. Elements of the 4th Regiment from the ROC Marine Corps' 2nd Brigade landed to cover the evacuation of the ROC Navy from Yulin. The military evacuation was completed by the 27 April.

Sanya and Yulin in the south fell to the communists within a week of Haikou. The PRC declared victory on 1 May. The ROC announced the abandonment of the island on 2 May.

== Aftermath ==
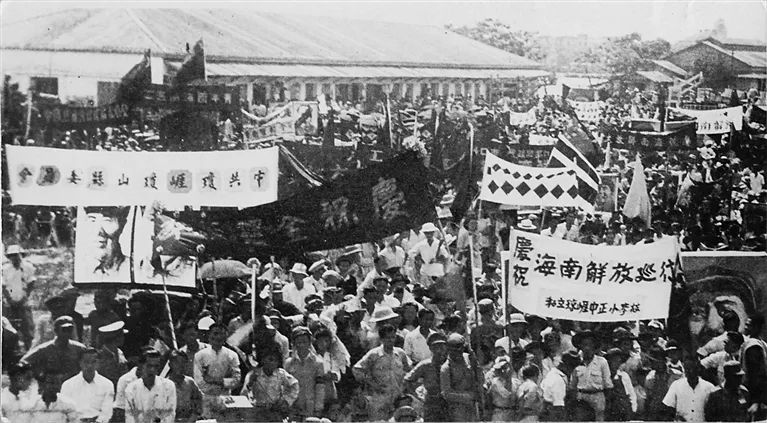
A parade celebrating the capture of Hainan on 1 May 1950

The conquest was quickly overshadowed by the start of the Korean War and the First Taiwan Strait Crisis.

The CCP marginalized the Hainan communist movement in the following decade. The CCP was dissatisfied with the HIC's relative lack of ideological rigour and its perceived "localism"; the HIC survival strategy had been pragmatic and had included compromise with the Hlai. Local communists and the Hlai became notable obstacles to the PRC's land reform program.

The PRC's military histories emphasized the 15th Corps' actions. The assault across the strait was popularized into stories of a "people's flotilla" of wooden junks manned by volunteers and fishermen fighting metal ROC warships. The role of the HIC and the Hlai received much less attention. For the Hainan communist movement the battle was the culmination of the war they had fought against the ROC for 23 years with little outside support.

== See also ==
- Outline of the Chinese Civil War
- Outline of the military history of the People's Republic of China
- Martyrs' cemetery in Golden Bull Mountain Ridge Park
