= Mulantou Lighthouse =

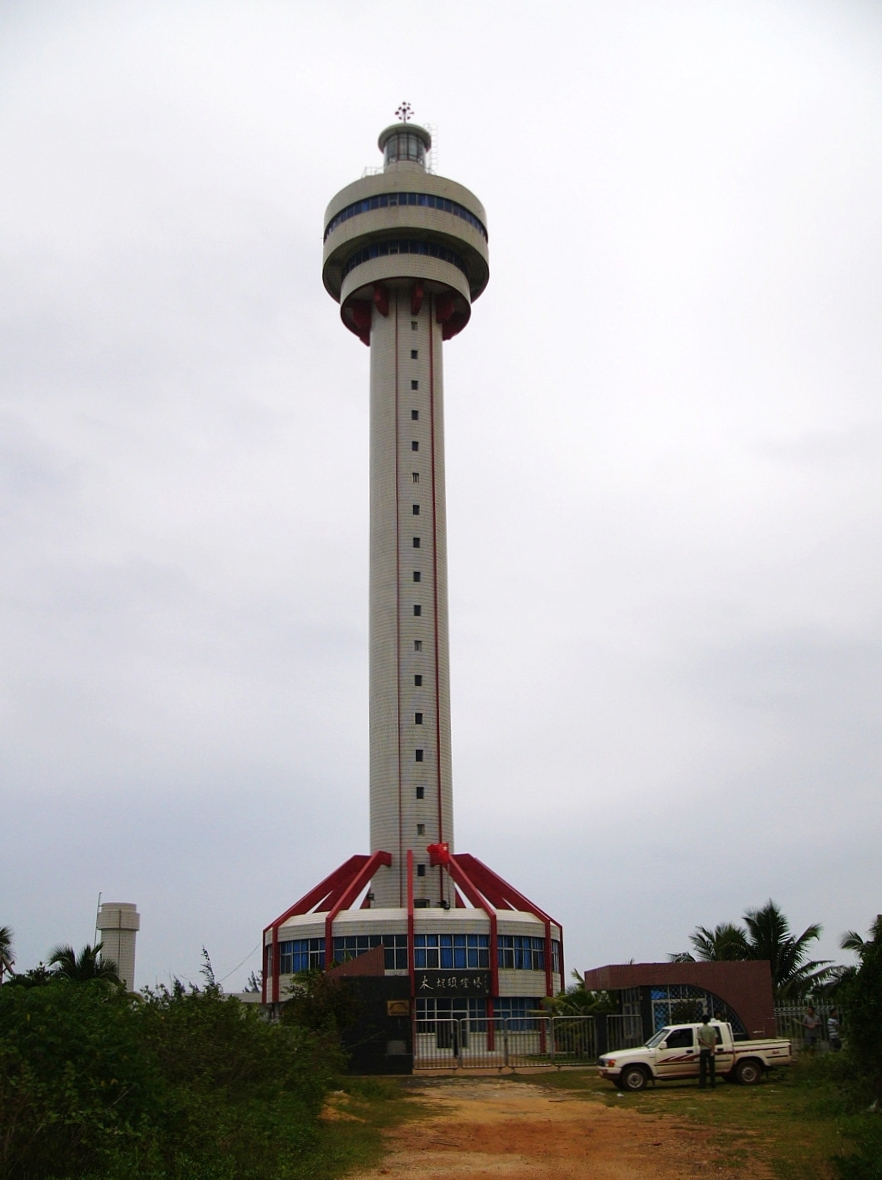
- Mulantou Lighthouse, 2004
- Location: Wenchang, Hainan, China
- Coordinates: 20°9′35.95″N 110°41′4.36″E

Tower
- Constructed: 1995
- Construction: concrete tower
- Height: 237 feet (72 m)
- Shape: cylindrical tower with balcony, lantern and observation room
- Markings: white with red trim

Light
- First lit: 1995
- Focal height: 289 feet (88 m)
- Range: 25 nautical miles (46 km; 29 mi)
- Characteristic: Fl (2) W 15s.
- China no.: CN-4989

Mulantou Lighthouse (Chinese: 木栏头灯塔), also known as the Hainan Head Light, located in the province of Hainan, China, is the fifth-tallest lighthouse in the world, and the tallest in China.

Built in 1995, this active lighthouse has a focal plane of 289 feet (88 m). It emits two white flashes every 15 seconds.

The Mulantou Lighthouse is 237 feet (72 m) tall. It is located on a sharp promontory at the northeastern tip of the province, and marks the south side of the entrance to Qiongzhou Strait.

The structure is round cylindrical concrete rising from a 2-story circular base. It has a large circular observation room. This lighthouse is white in colour with red trim.

== See also ==
- List of lighthouses in China
- List of tallest lighthouses in the world
- Baishamen Lighthouse – the second tallest lighthouse in China
