= Baishamen Park =

Park in Haikou, China

- 白沙门公园
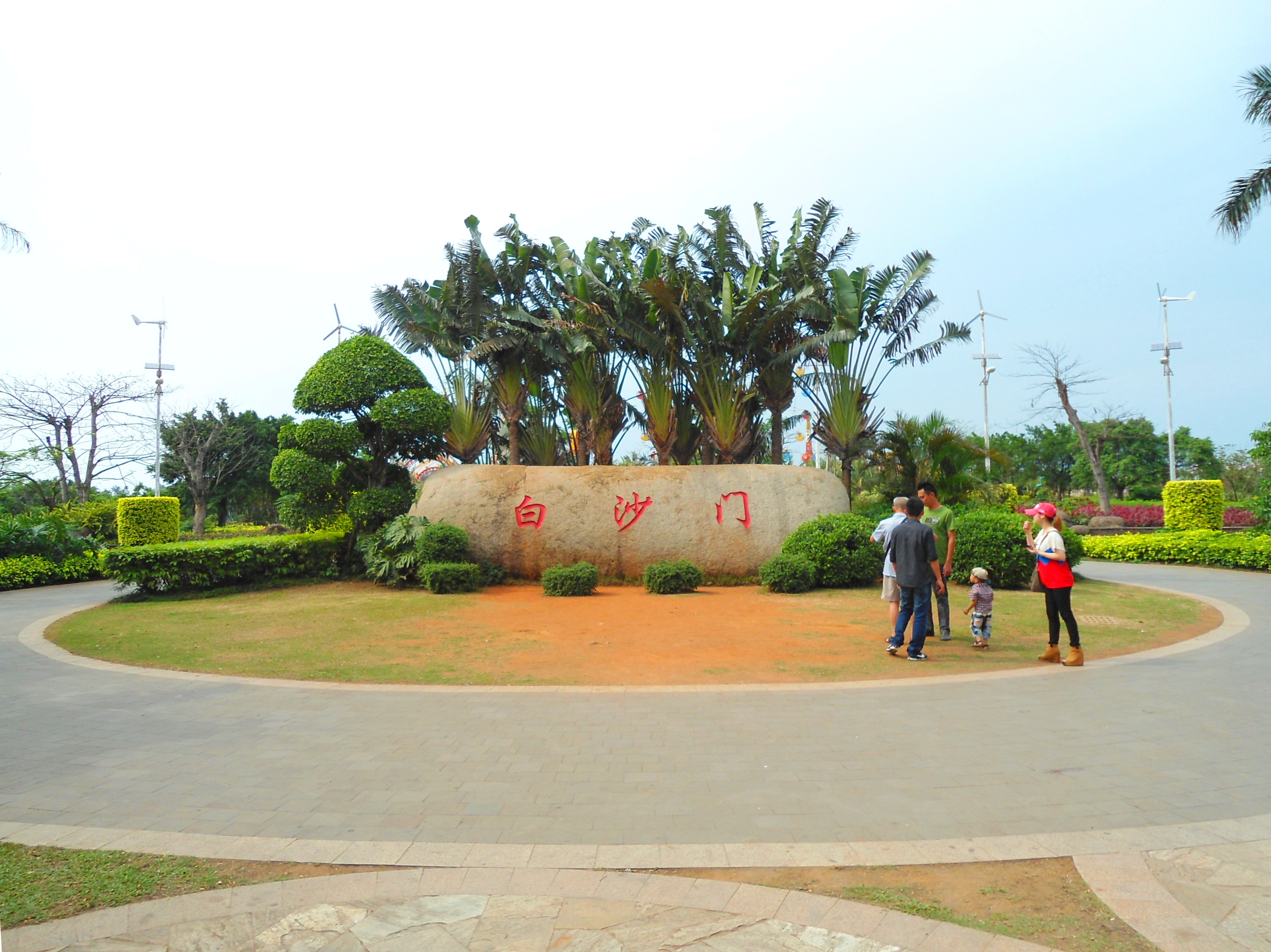
- Front entrance
- Interactive map of Baishamen Park
- Type: Urban park
- Location: Haidian Island, Haikou, Hainan Province, China
- Coordinates: 20°04′26″N 110°19′53″E
- Created: January 24, 2009
- Status: Open all year

Baishamen Park (Chinese: 白沙门公园) is a park located in the northern part of Haidian Island, Haikou City, Hainan Province, China.

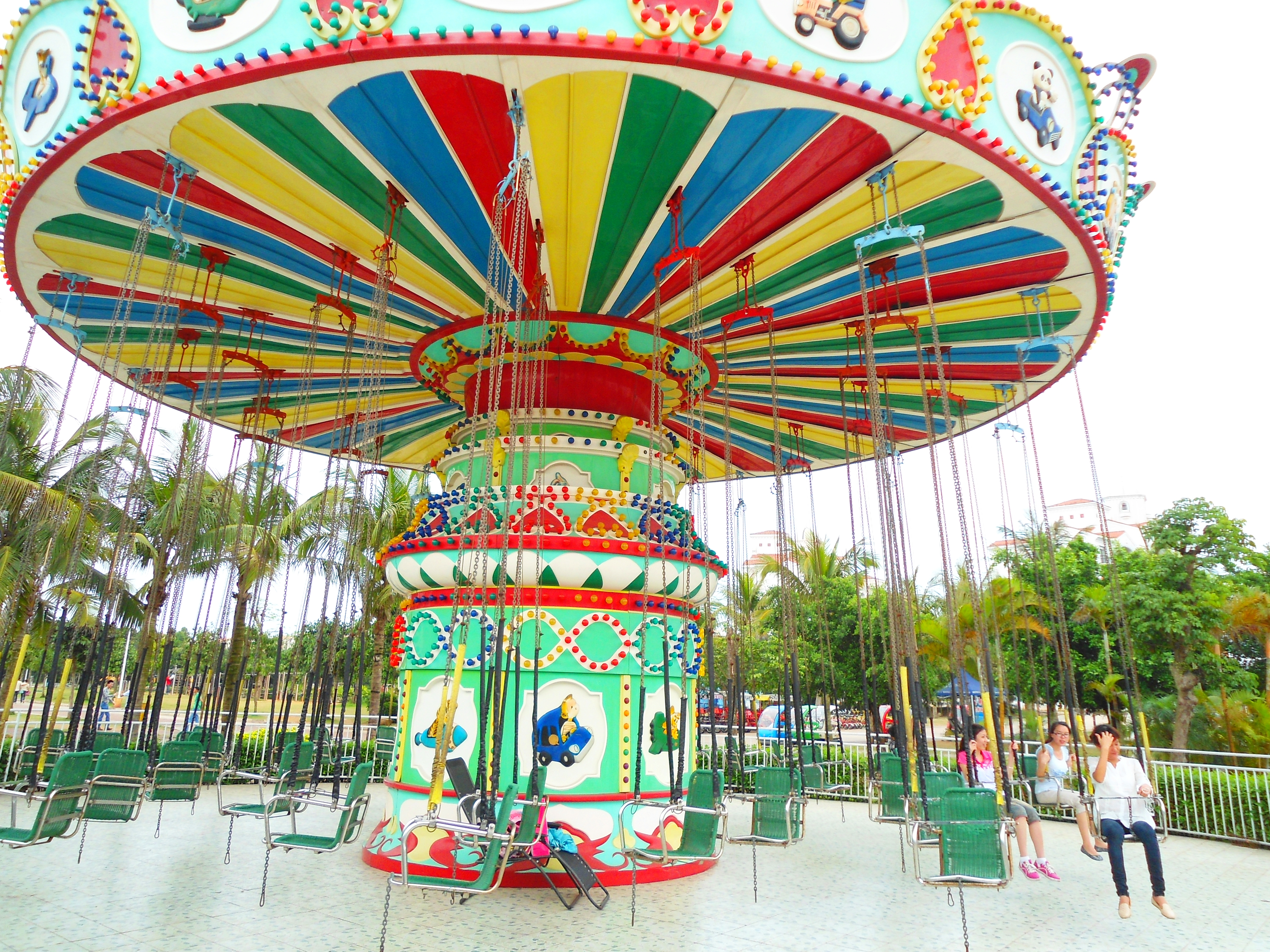

Opened on January 24, 2009, the park and has a total area of 60 hectares. It contains a small amusement park, and artificial lake. The northern edge is a sandy beach on the Qiongzhou Strait.

It is one of the major parks in Haikou, and can be compared to Evergreen Park, due to its high percentage of grass fields. The other two, Golden Bull Mountain Ridge Park and Haikou People's Park, have a high percentage of tree cover.
