= People's Park (Haikou) =

Public park in Haikou, Hainan, China

Coordinates: 20°2′0″N 110°20′36″E

- 人民公园
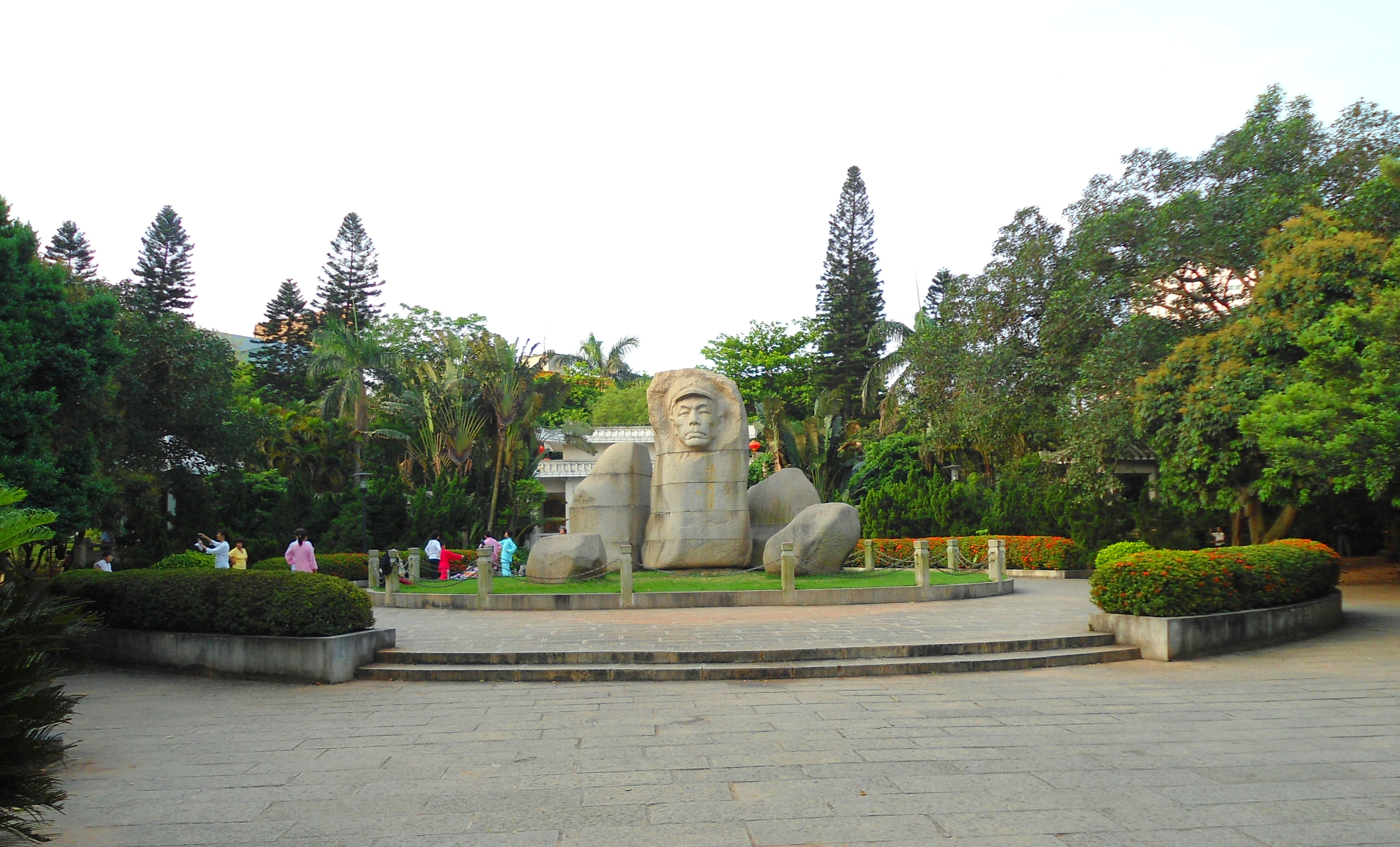
- Monument of Feng Baiju at summit plateau
- Interactive map of People's Park
- Type: Urban park
- Location: Haikou, Hainan, China
- Created: 1954
- Status: Open all year

People's Park (Chinese: 人民公园; pinyin: Rénmín Gōngyuán) is a public park in Haikou, capital of Hainan Province, China. It is located in the centre of the city. It is bordered by Haixiu Road on the south. On northern boundary is Datong Road and East Lake.

Established in 1954, the park covers a total area of over 300 acres. During the late 2000s, it was renovated, with new pathways installed. It is one of four major parks in Haikou, and can be compared to Golden Bull Mountain Ridge Park, due to its high percentage of tree cover. The other two, Baishamen Park and Evergreen Park, consist mostly of open grass fields.

The park comprises a single, large hill, with a plateau at the summit. This landscape feature is unusual in Haikou, as the city is almost entirely flat. Hundreds of winding, narrow pathways are present among a wide variety of flora. Most of the park is covered with a canopy of trees providing mostly shady areas. Compared to other Haikou parks, such as Baishamen Park and Evergreen Park, People's Park is considerably more lush, and contains far more diverse and concentrated flora.

Video of public square dancing

The park, being adjacent to numerous old neighbourhoods, is popular with local Hainan residents, in particular, senior citizens. Each morning, beginning at dawn, thousands of people arrive to partake in exercises. Ad hoc groups form to participate in such activities as badminton, ping pong, tai chi, square dancing, kung fu, jianzi, and aerobics. Tai chi and fitness dancing congregations dominate, with dozens of separate groups present throughout the park. The circular path around the summit plateau is occupied by hundreds of people walking for exercise. No bicycles are allowed in the park, and there is no admission fee.

The park contains many features and amenities, including:

- Ping pong area with several tables
- Public bathrooms
- Convenience store
- Police outpost
- Exercise equipment
- Gateball area
