= Baishamen Lighthouse =

Baishamen Lighthouse Báishā Mén
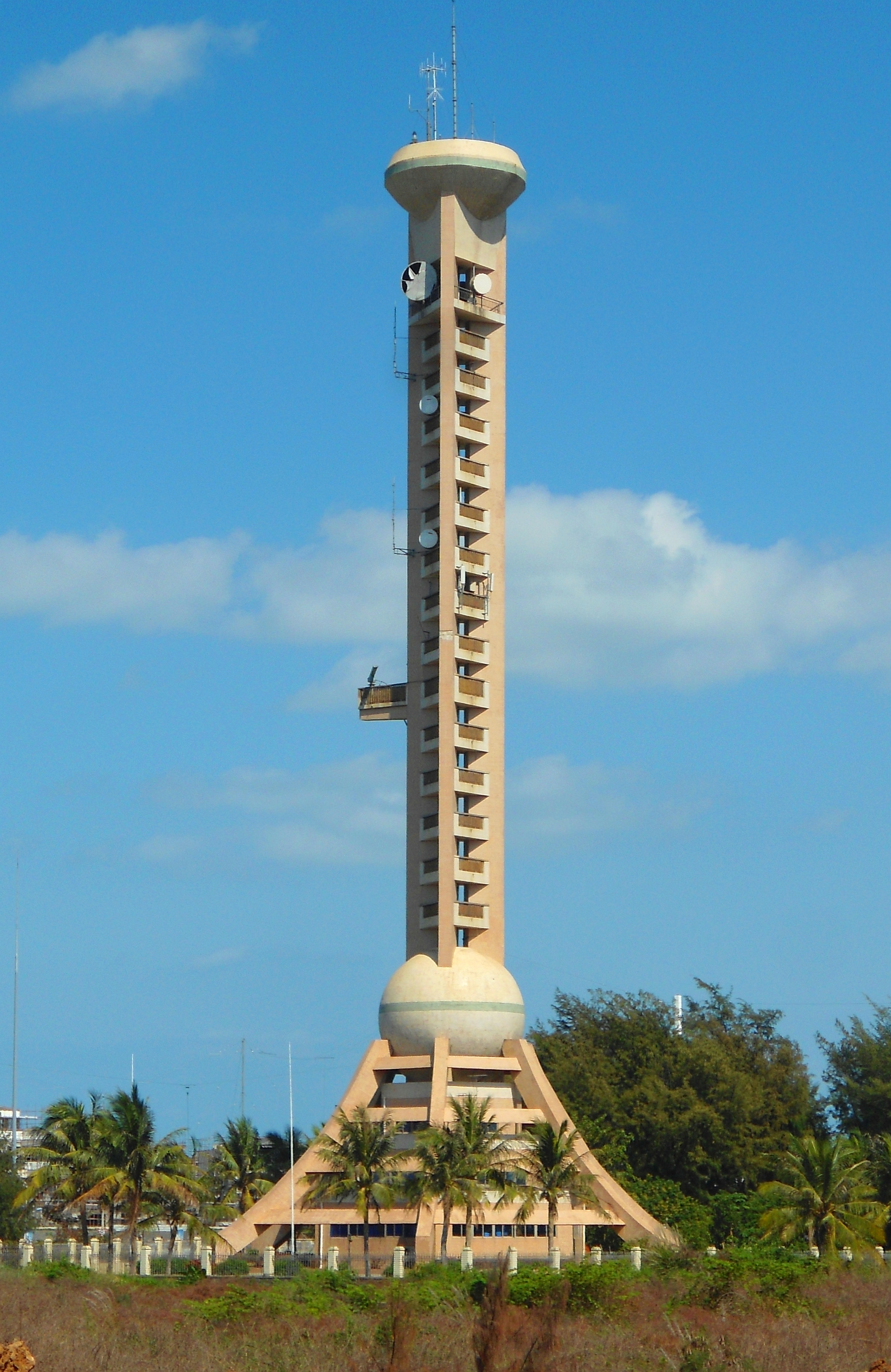
- Baishamen Lighthouse
- Location: Haidian Island, Haikou; Hainan, China
- Coordinates: 20.071366°N 110.314068°E

Tower
- Constructed: 2000
- Construction: concrete
- Height: 236 feet (72 m)
- Shape: triangular prism tower rising from a 4-story hexagonal basement
- Markings: white tower

Light
- First lit: c. 2000
- Focal height: 256 feet (78 m)
- Range: 18 nautical miles (33 km; 21 mi)
- Characteristic: Fl W 6s.

Baishamen Lighthouse (Chinese: 白沙门灯塔), located on Haidian Island, Haikou, in the province of Hainan, China, is the sixth tallest lighthouse in the world, and the second tallest in China. Rising from a three-storey hexagonal base, the structure is 236 feet (72 m) tall. This active lighthouse has a focal plane of 256 feet (78 m) and sends out a white flash every six seconds. The triangular, cylindrical tower and base are made entirely of white concrete.

It serves as a landfall light for the city of Haikou, and is located on the east side of the entrance to Haikou Bay, the harbor of Haikou on the northeast shore of Haidian Island.

== See also ==
- List of lighthouses in China
- List of tallest lighthouses in the world
- Mulantou Lighthouse – the tallest lighthouse in China
