= Haikou People's Hospital =

Coordinates: 20.062643°N 110.335629°E

Haikou People's Hospital 海口市人民医院
- (Haikou People's Hospital and Central South University Xiangya School of Medicine Affiliated Haikou Hospital)

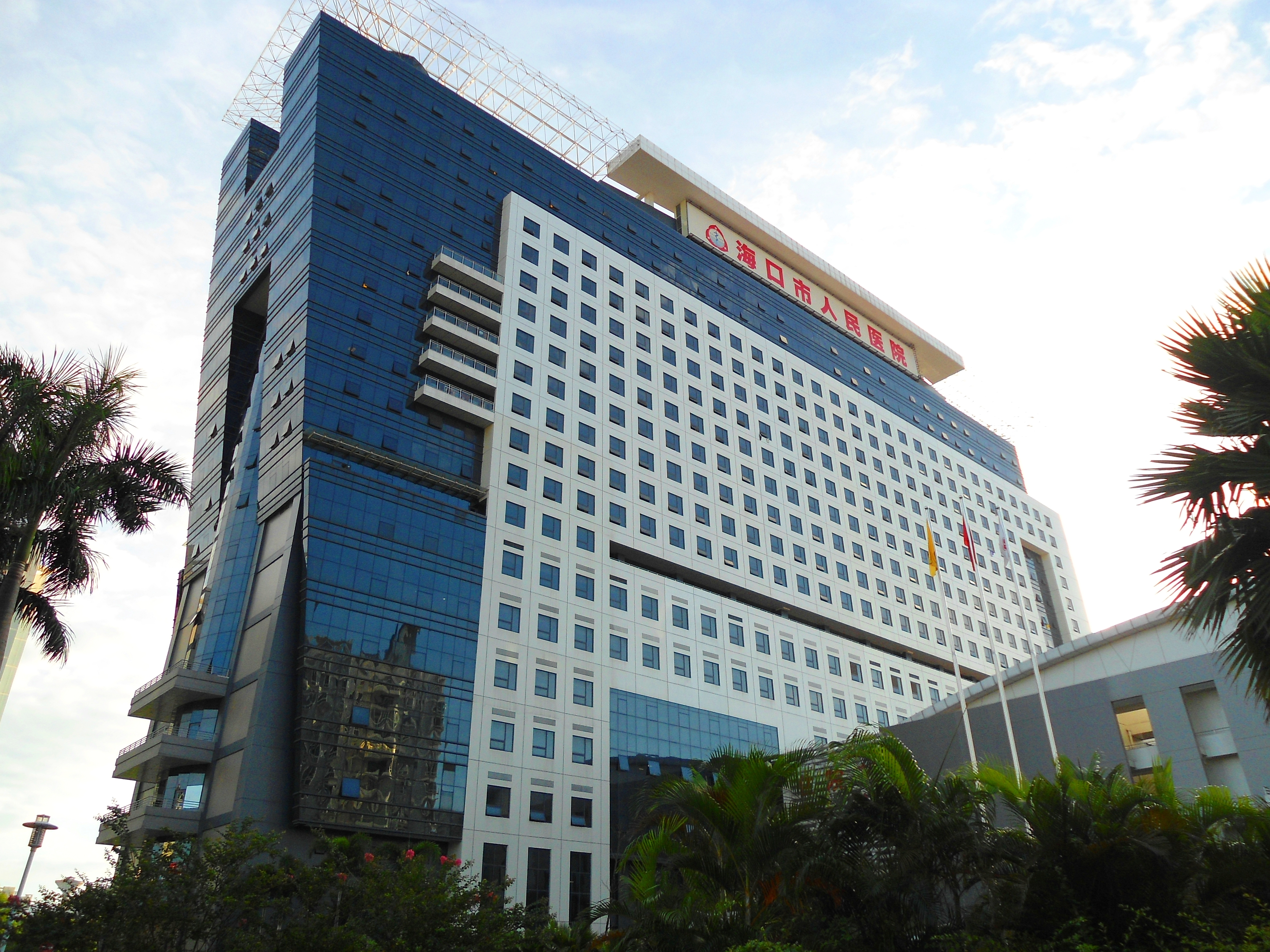
- Front of hospital

Geography
- Location: Haidian Island, Haikou, China

Organisation
- Care system: Medicare
- Type: General

Services
- Emergency department: Yes
- Beds: 1,200

History
- Opened: 1901

Links
- Website: haikoumh.com.cn
- Lists: Hospitals in China

The Haikou People's Hospital (Chinese: 海口市人民医院) is located on Renmin Avenue, Haidian Island, Haikou City, Hainan Province, China.

The hospital was founded in 1901, and has a staff of 2,254 people. There are available 1,700 beds, with a further 1,200 planned. The hospital has a total floor space of 250,000 square meters, containing an approximately 500 million yuan worth of medical equipment.

The main building on Renmin Avenue was constructed from about 2008 to 2011.
