= Haidian Island =

Island in People's Republic of China

Native name: 海甸岛
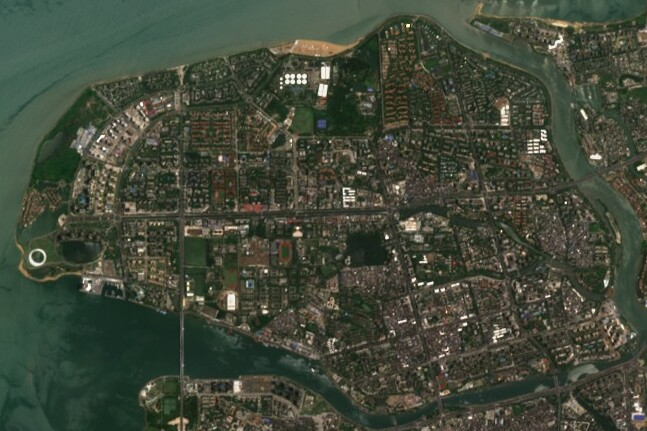
- A satellite image of the island

- Location within Hainan

Geography
- Coordinates: 20°02′34″N 110°20′30″E

Administration
- People's Republic of China
- Province: Hainan
- Prefecture-level city: Haikou

Haidian Island (simplified Chinese: 海甸岛; traditional Chinese: 海甸島; pinyin: Hǎidiàn Dǎo) is an island that forms part of the city of Haikou, Hainan Province, China. It is separated from the main part of Haikou by the Haidian River. The north coast faces the Qiongzhou Strait. The east coast faces Xinbu Island, separated by part of the Nandu River. The west coast faces Haikou Bay.

Both Renmin Avenue and Heping Avenue are the main streets on the island. The former that runs through the middle of the island from the south at the Renmin Bridge to the north shore at the newly built Baishamen Park, which contains an amusement park. Hainan University's main campus is located on the west side of this avenue.

The western part of the island has been expanded as part of a land reclamation project started in the late 2000s.

== Notable locations ==
- Hainan University's main campus is situated between Haidian West 3rd Road and Haidian West 5th Road.
- Created in 2010, Baishamen Park, an ocean-side recreational leisure facility is located on the north coast. It contains an amusement park, artificial lake, and various sports facilities.
- Baishamen Lighthouse, the second tallest in China and sixth tallest in the world, is located at the northwest corner of the island.
- Haikou City People's Hospital, a large new hospital on Renmin Avenue.

== Access ==
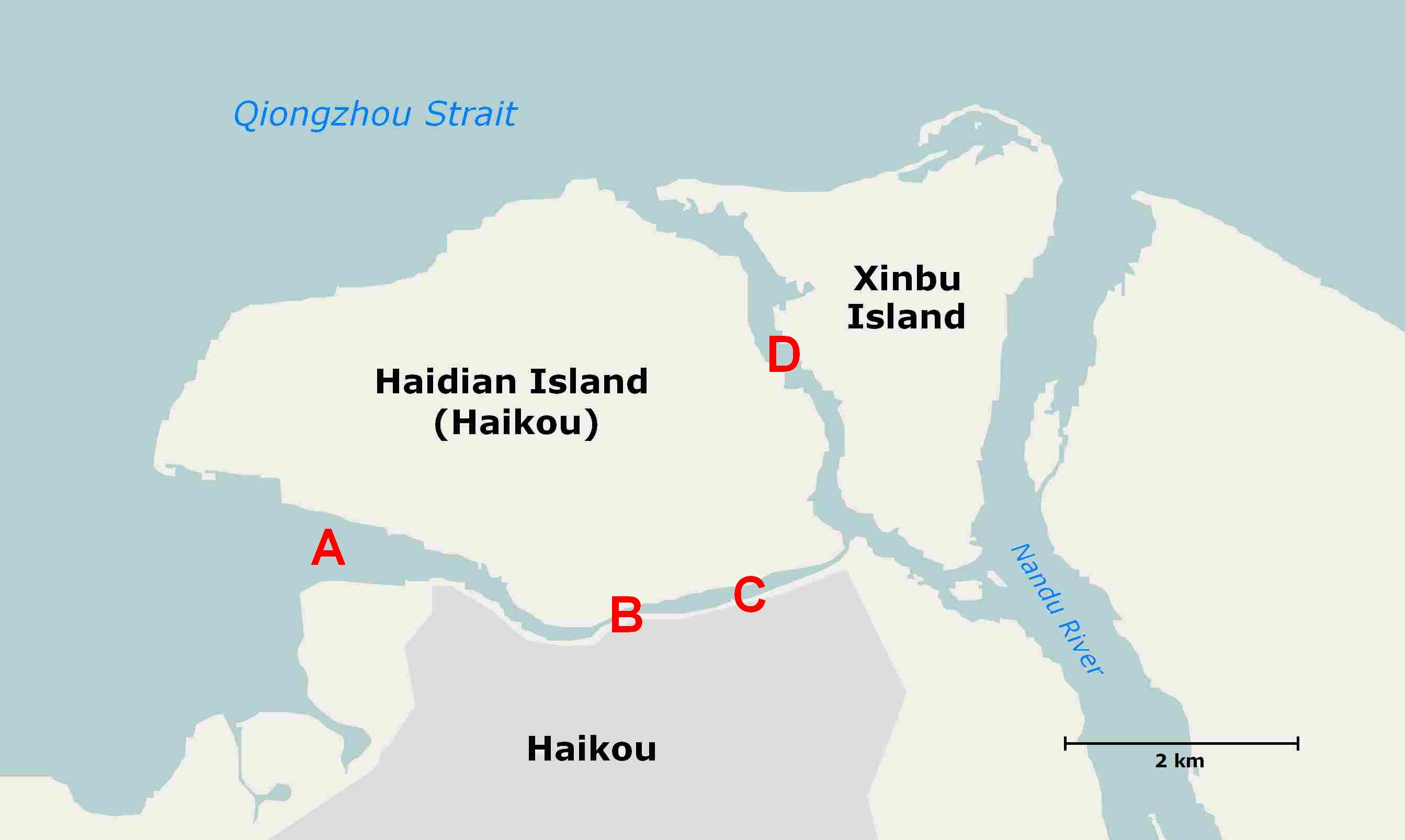
A: Haikou Century Bridge; B: Renmin Bridge; C: Heping Bridge; D: Xinbu Bridge

The island is accessible via four bridges:

- Haikou Century Bridge crosses the mouth of the Haidian River from the main part of Haikou, at the north end of Long Kun North Road (龙昆北路), connecting with the end of Haidian West 5th Road (海甸五西路).
- Renmin Bridge (人民大桥) crosses a narrow section of the Haidian River linking Changdi Road (长堤路) with Renmin Avenue (人民大道).
- Heping Bridge (和平大桥) connects Changdi Road and Heping Avenue (和平大桥) across the Haidian River.
- Xinbu Bridge spans a branch of the Nandu River to link Xinbu Island (新埠岛) with Haidian East 5th Road (海甸五栋路).
- A new bridge is currently under construction that will connect Haidian Island to Xinbu Island. It is located north of the Xinbu Bridge.

== Gallery ==
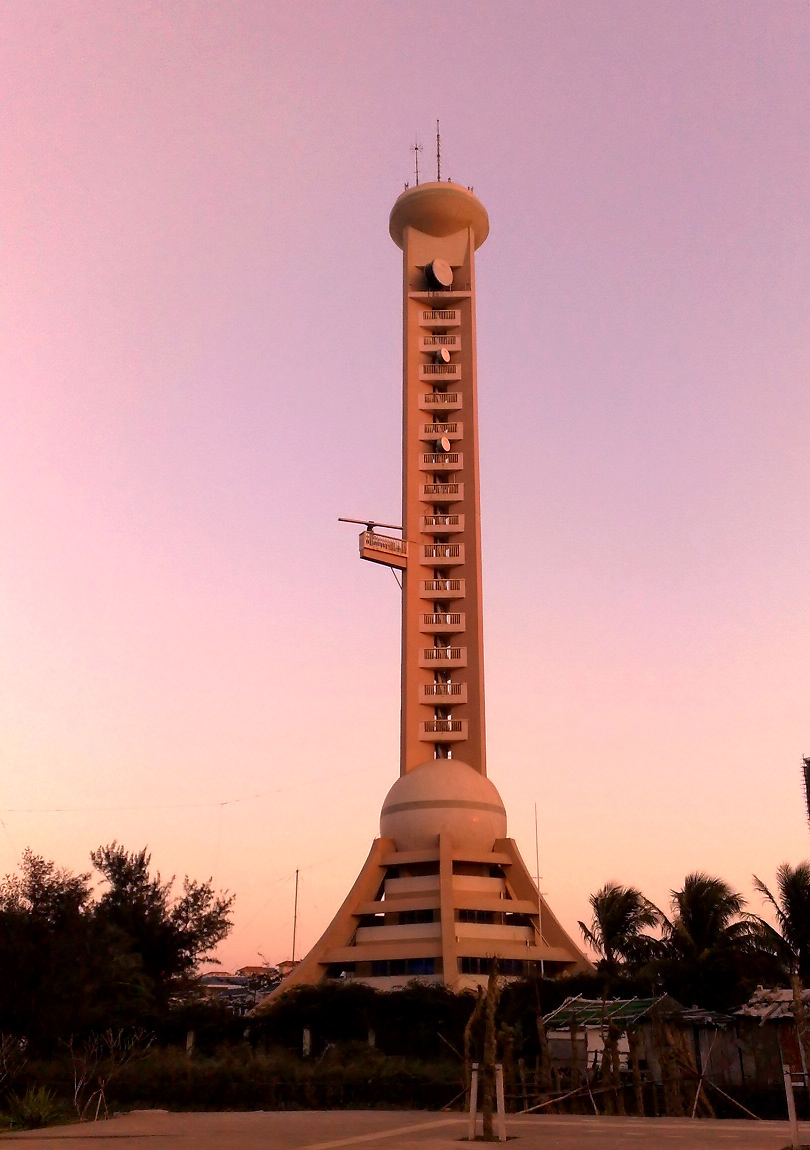
Baishamen Lighthouse, the sixth tallest lighthouse in the world and the second tallest in China

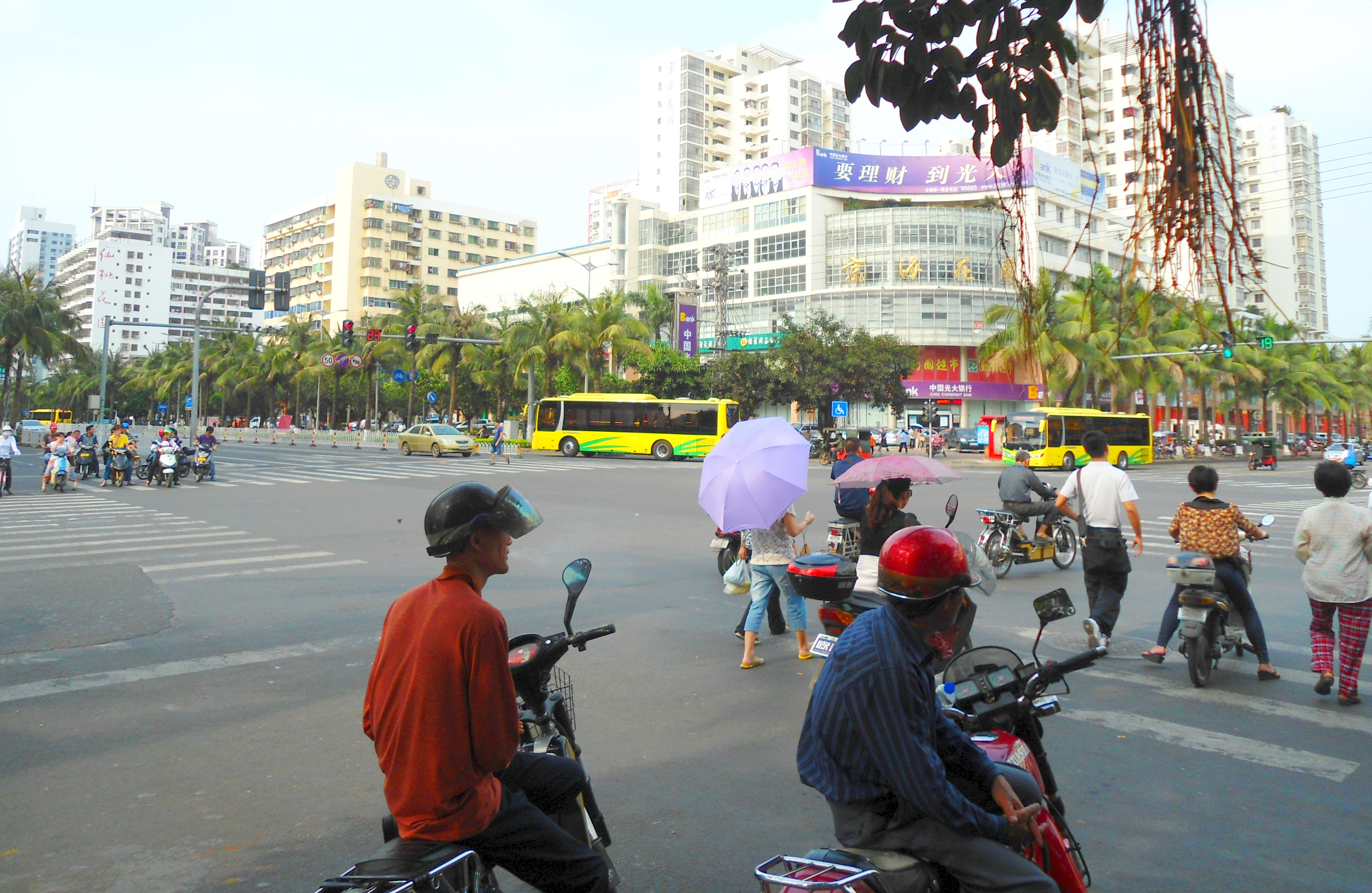
The southwest corner of Renmin Avenue and #3 road

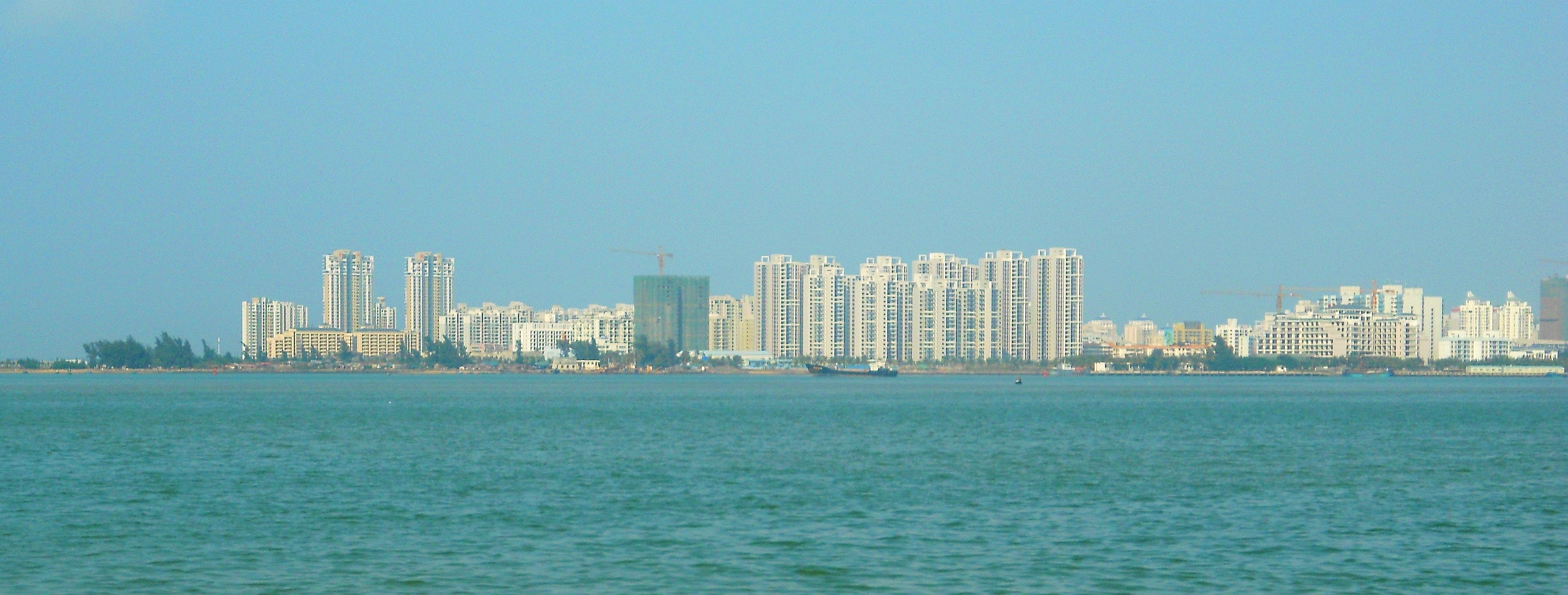
The southwestern part of Haidian Island as viewed from Haikou Bay

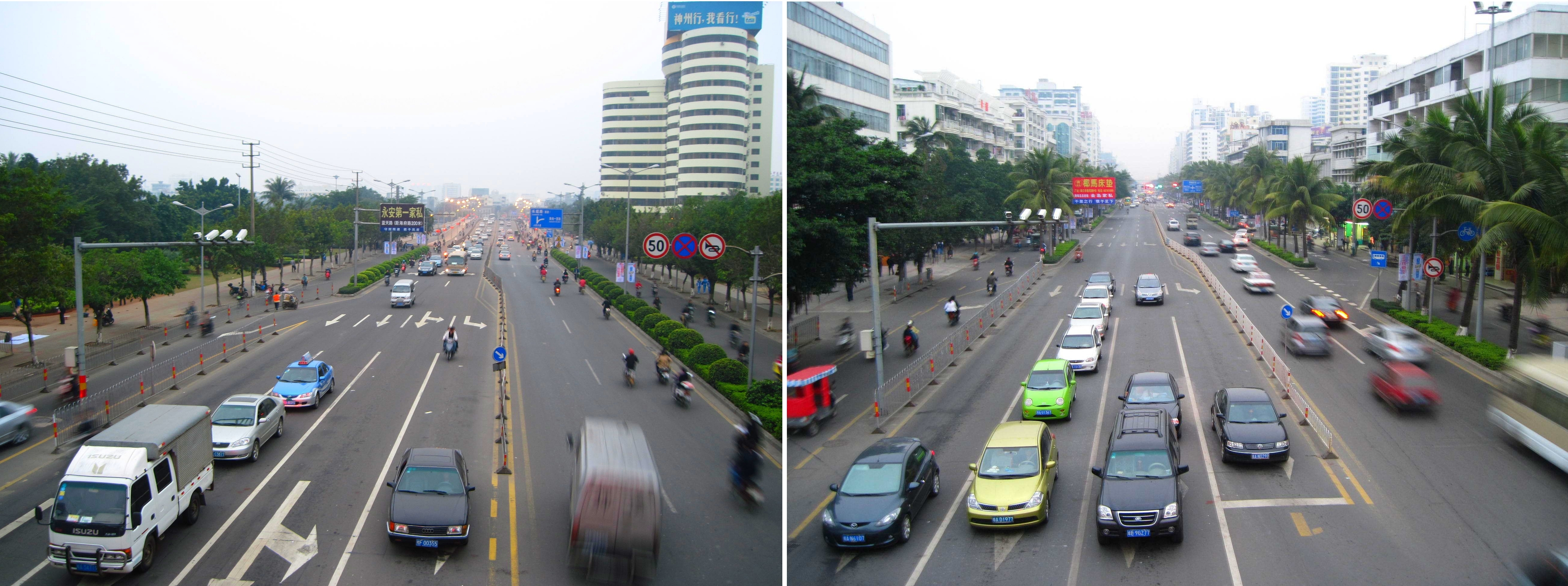
Remin Avenue looking facing south and north
