= Golden Bull Mountain Ridge Park =

Park in Haikou, Hainan, China

- 金牛岭公园
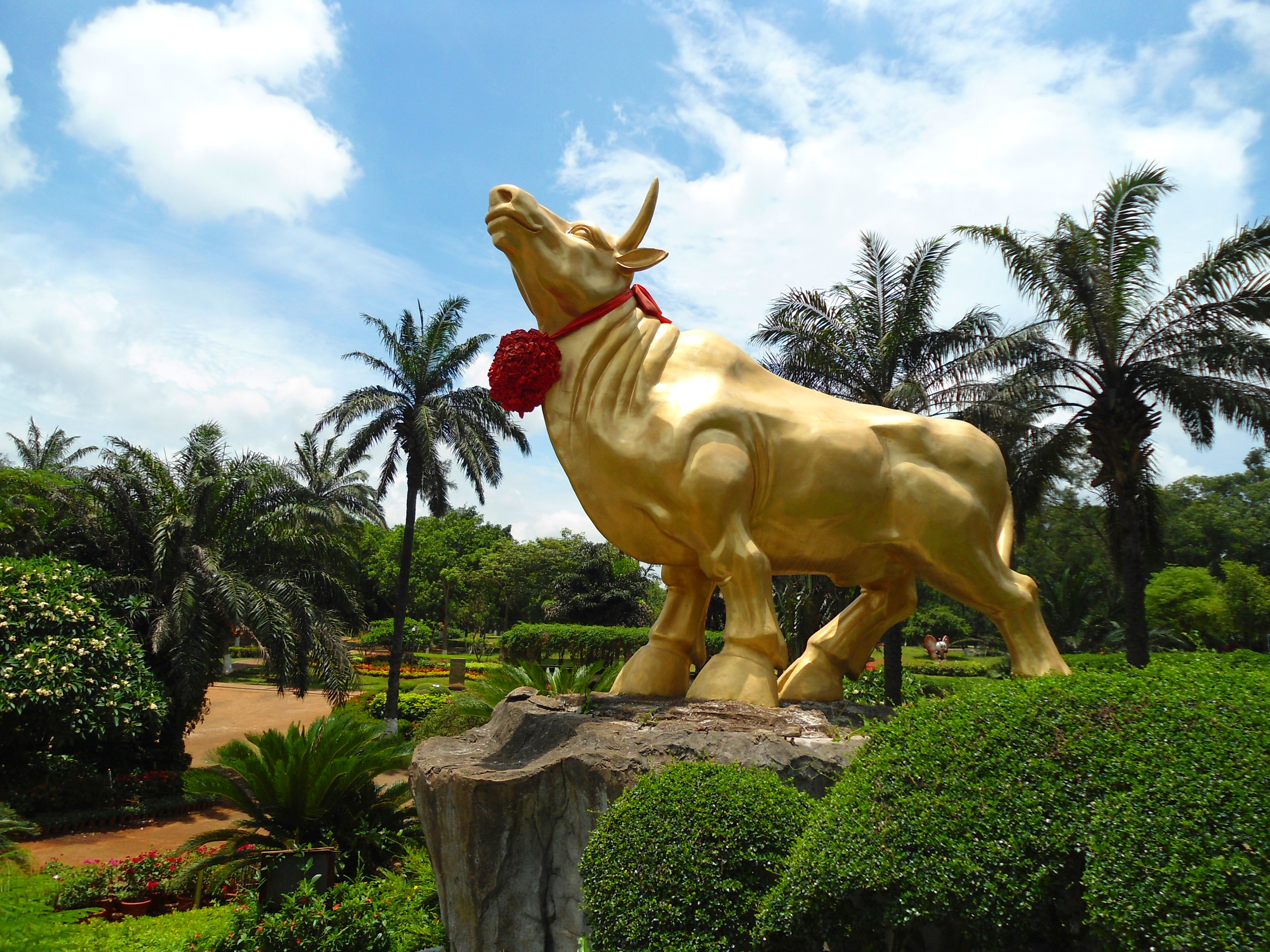
- The "golden bull" by the front gate stands about three metres tall
- Interactive map of Golden Bull Mountain Ridge Park
- Type: Urban park
- Location: Haikou, Hainan Province, China
- Coordinates: 20°00′46″N 110°18′42″E
- Elevation: 35.2 metres
- Created: January 3, 1996
- Open: 06:00 - 22:00 with entry not allowed at other times
- Status: Open all year
- Plants: Bamboo, flowers, trees
- Collections: Palms

Golden Bull Mountain Ridge Park (Chinese: 金牛岭公园) is a public park located in Haikou City, Hainan Province, China.

The park is situated in the middle of the city, roughly 100 metres south of Haixiu Road. It has a total size of 102 hectares (250 acres), and was created in 1996, the same year that Evergreen Park was completed. The most prominent features of the park are a cemetery, a 15.8-hectare (39-acre) lake, a zoo, and numerous, diverse forest areas.

It is one of four major parks in Haikou, and can be compared to Haikou People's Park, due to its high percentage of tree cover. The other two, Baishamen Park and Evergreen Park, consist mostly of open grass fields.

On the plateau at the top of the park is a pigeon aviary and a butterfly garden. About 96% of the park has green cover, much of which is forest area.

== Etymology ==
A local legend says that a fairy bull would appear on the mountain ridge during years of drought. It would summon up winds and call for rain to come.

== Features ==
- The park is one of the few elevated areas in an otherwise flat city.
- Pigeon aviary and open, public area within which they flock
- Animal zoo
- Bamboo forest
- Lake at the east side
- Cemetery near the top of the mountain
- Beneath the park is a water reserve.
- Plaza for gatherings and exercise
- Palm garden

== Flora and fauna ==
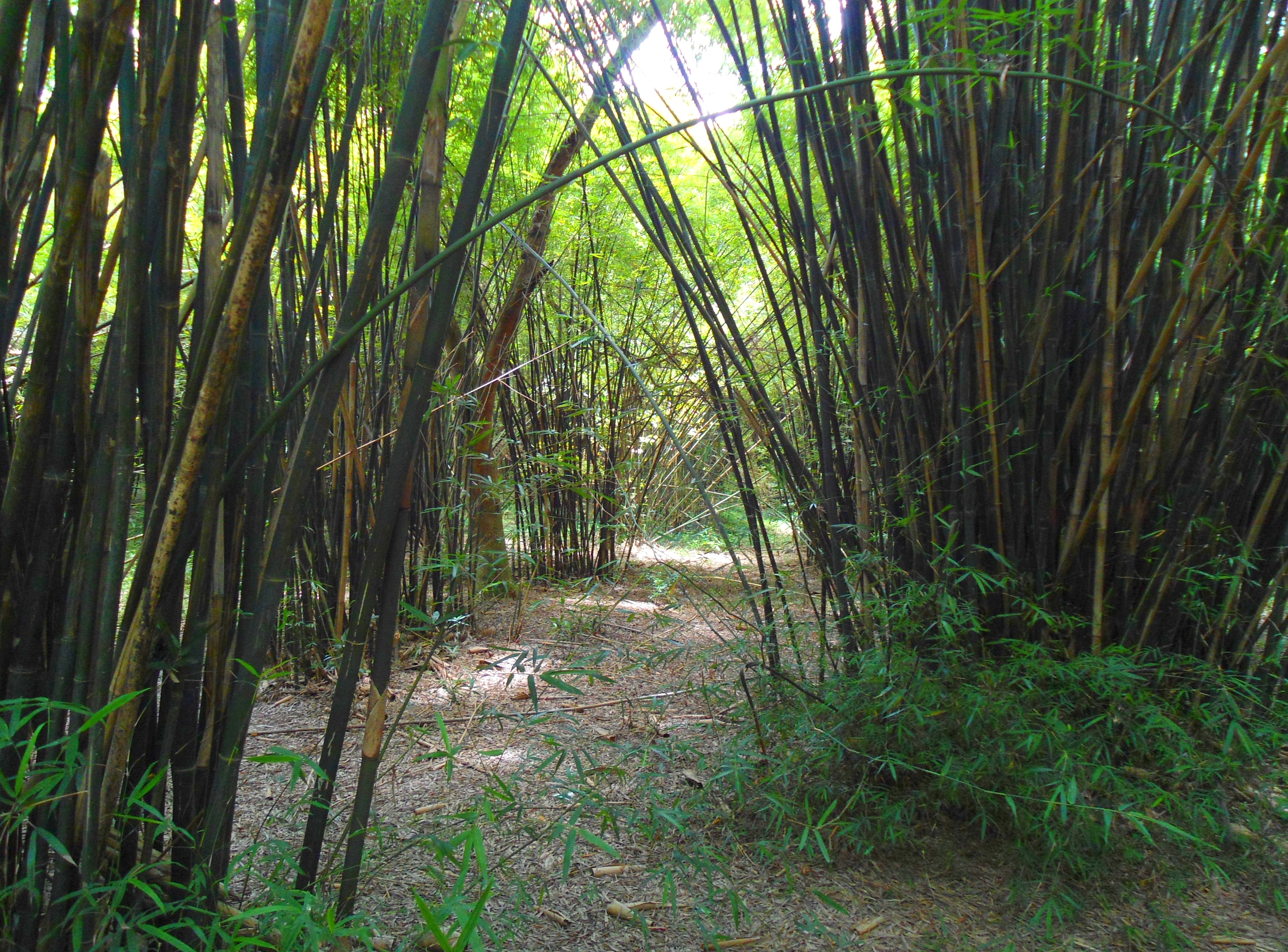
Bamboo forest

The center of the park contains a large bamboo forest consisting of thousands of stands of bamboo, with natural pathways between. There are more than 140 families of trees and over 1,000 species. Dozens of individual forest areas exist, each predominantly containing one or two types of trees. There is also a pineapple-and-betel-nut plantation, and a 3.5-hectare (8.6-acre) orchard containing sapodilla (in particular Manilkara zapota), lychee, carambola, and other fruit trees. Within this area is a 2.3-hectare (5.7-acre) jackfruit orchard. There is also a large plant nursery. The total green coverage of the land area of the park is over 96%.

White pigeons are found in the area at the top of the park. Toads are commonly seen through the park.

== Battle of the Liberation on Hainan Island Martyrs' Cemetery ==
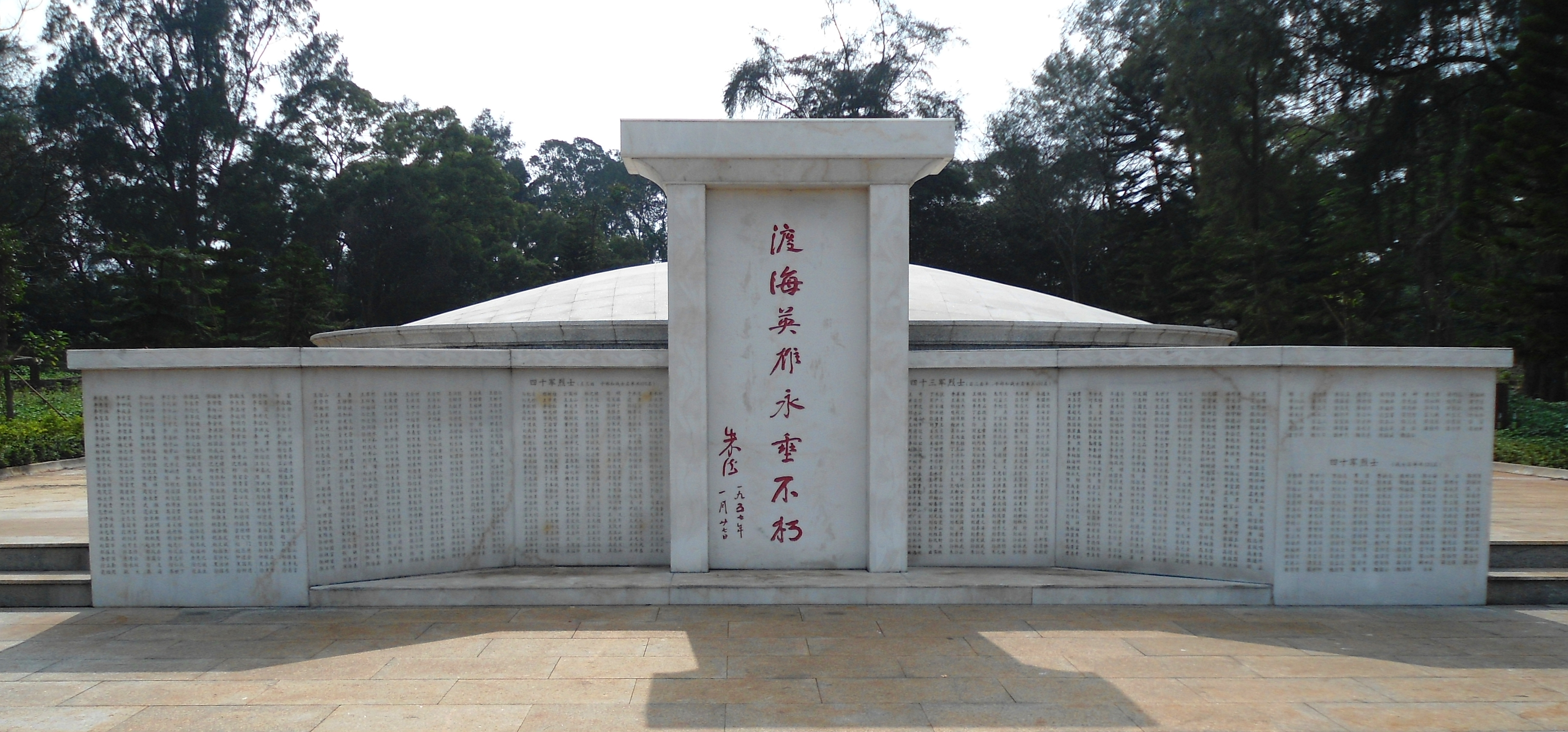
Memorial at the Martyrs' Cemetery

Located within the park, this cemetery was established to mark the sixtieth anniversary of the liberation of Hainan from the Japanese (December 31, 2008) and to cherish the memory of the martyrs who died for that cause. The creation of the cemetery was approved by the municipal government in March 2009.

The total area of the squares and monuments is 4,200 square metres (70 metres long by 60 metres wide). The main monument is 16 metres tall, and was designed to resemble a boat hull crossing the sea, symbolizing the Landing Operation on Hainan Island. It also depicts the battles of Feng Baiju's "Qiongya Zongdui" (Hainan Independent Column).

The construction was managed by the Haikou City Bureau of Civil Affairs and was designed by Beijing Zhen-Dong International Construction Design Ltd. The actual construction was done by the Sixth Urban Construction Engineering Bureau Group Co., Ltd.

Members of Qiongya Zongdui and other troops who took part in the landing operation collaborated in the design and construction process.

The construction took place between December 1, 2009 and March 31, 2010, taking a total of 120 days. The cost was 4.61 million yuan, 3.9 million of which was provided by the central government, with the remaining 710,000 paid for by Hainan province.

== Haikou Golden Bull Ridge Zoo ==
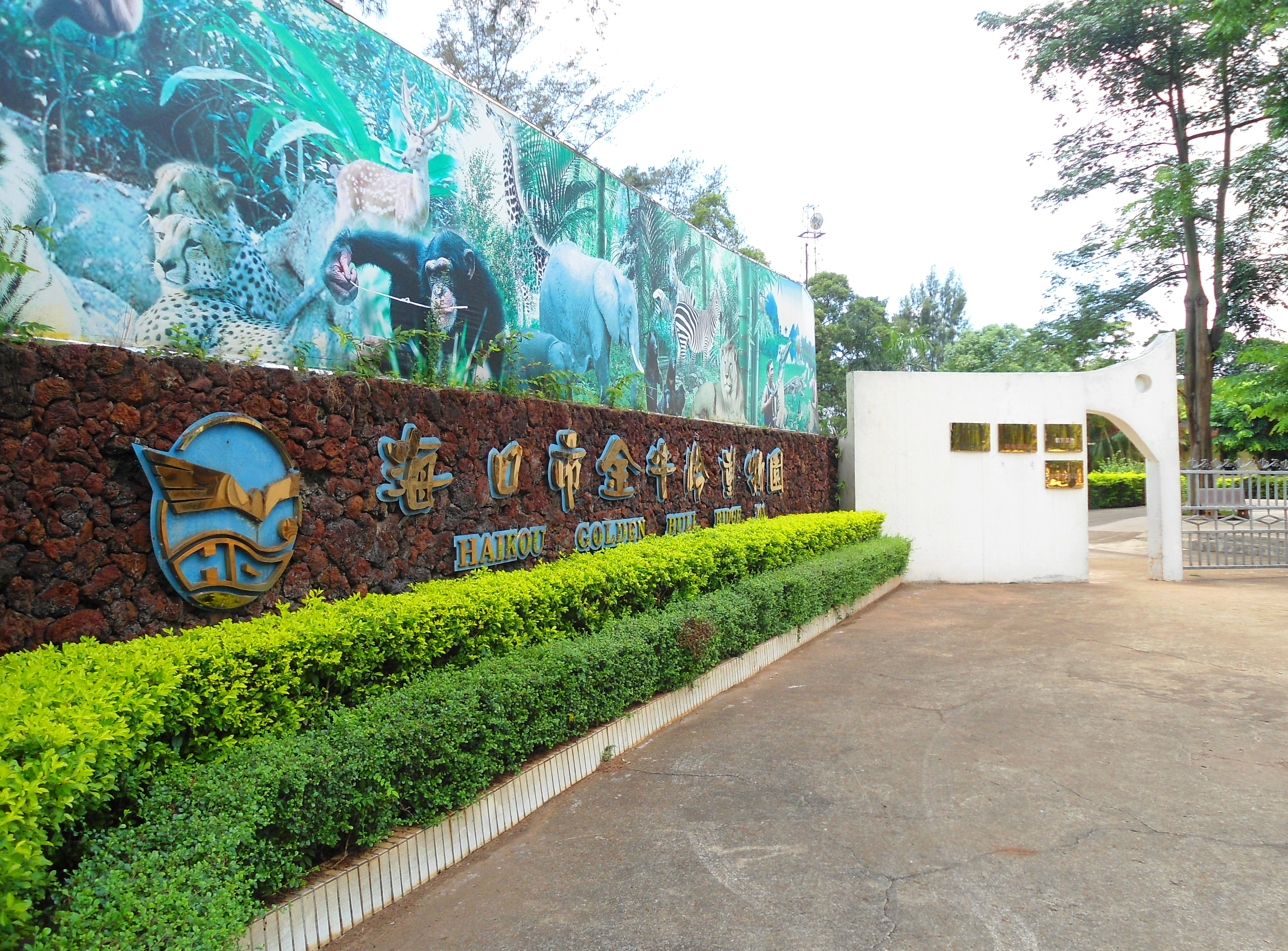
Golden Bull Mountain Ridge Zoo

This 7-hectare (17-acre) zoo is located on the plateau at the top of the park. It contains several small pavilions displaying monkeys, bears, zebras, deer, yak, reptiles, butterflies, water fowl, and dogs. Admission is charged to enter.
