= Evergreen Park (Haikou) =

Park in Haikou, China

- 万绿园
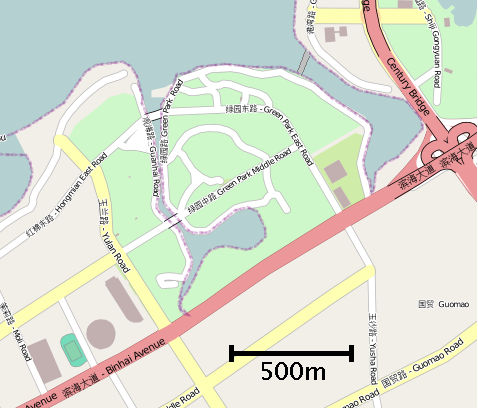
- Evergreen park viewed from Haikou Bay (The top-right corner of the image shows the nearby Binhai Park.)
- Interactive map of Evergreen Park
- Type: Urban park
- Location: Longhua District, Haikou, Hainan Province, China
- Coordinates: 20°02′10″N 110°18′35″E
- Created: January 3, 1996
- Status: Open all year

Evergreen Park (Chinese: 万绿园) is a public park located in Longhua District, Haikou, Hainan Province, China. It is the largest park in the city.

It is one of four major parks in Haikou and can be compared to Baishamen Park in that both have large, open, grass areas. The other two, Golden Bull Mountain Ridge Park and Haikou People's Park, have a relatively high percentage of tree cover. Many of the city's festivals and events are held in Evergreen Park.

== History ==
Evergreen Park was opened on January 3, 1996.

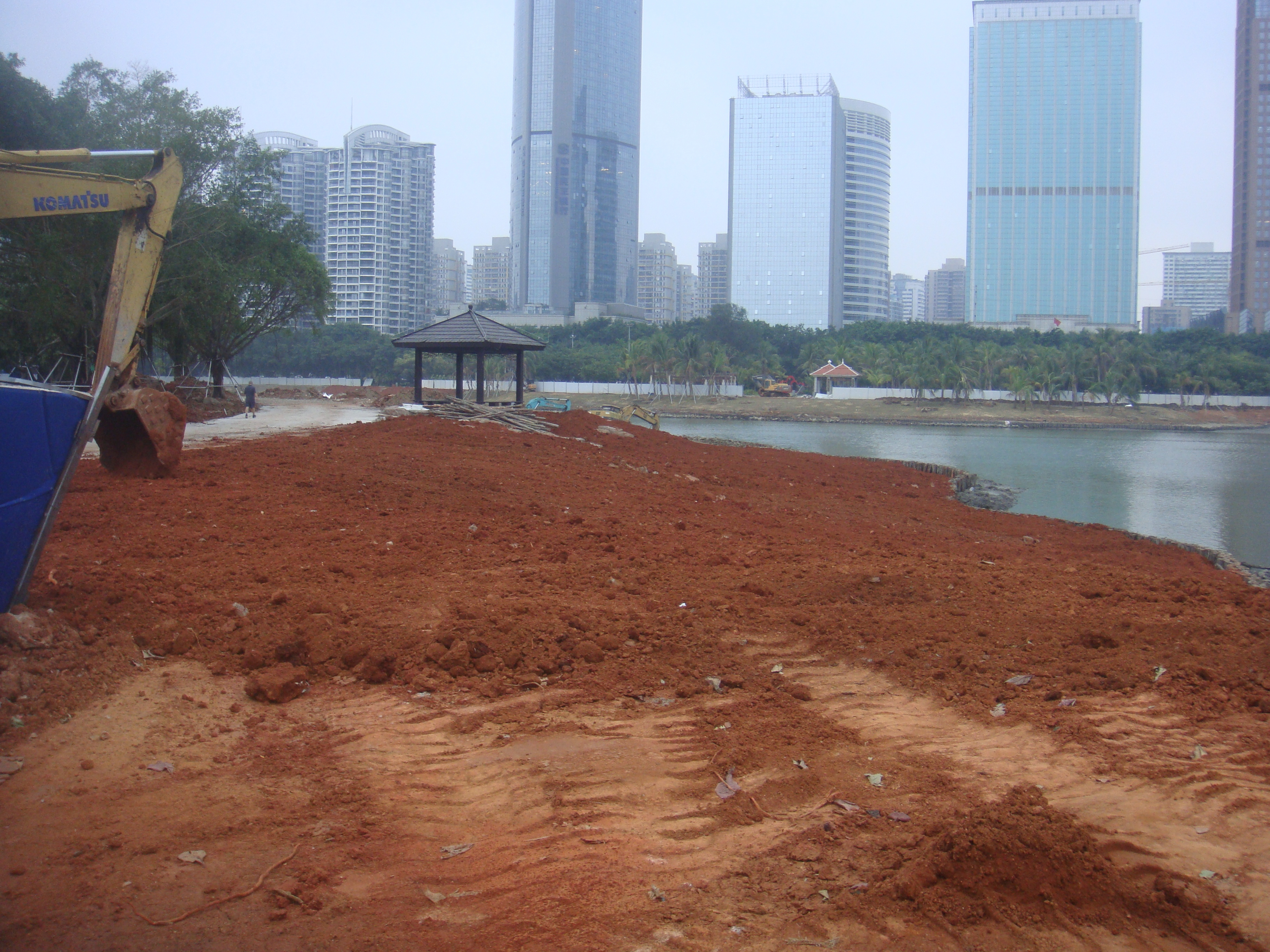
A view of the lake looking north during renovations

Around 2017 to 2018, the park was renovated. This involved landscaping, work on the plants, improving lakeside areas and drainage, the installation of footbridges and paved gathering areas, as well as an upgrade to the lighting within the park. Most of the main, east–west road, Lǜyuan Middle Road, was removed. The total area affected was 19,000 sq. metres.

With most of the renovations complete in the main part of the park by mid-2018, work began on the northwest part to bring it into use. Before then, it was mostly unmaintained and was used for maintenance workers to grow plants for the rest of the park.

== Location ==
Evergreen Park is situated on the north shore of Haikou city facing Haikou Bay.

The Haikou Great Hall of the People (a concert hall) and the former Hainan Exhibition & Convention Center (now being converted to a mall) are adjacent to the west side of the park. The mouth of the Haidian River and the Haikou Century Bridge are located by the eastern side. Haikou City Stadium is located on Binhai Road, at the southeastern corner of the park.

== Description ==
The main entrance to the park is on Bin Hai Road at the east end of the park. There, a city bus terminal is also located within the park to provide access.

Evergreen Park consists of largely of open grassy areas with approximately ten thousand coconut trees and hundreds of species of South Asian ornamental plants. There are numerous features, including a children's area, food streets, small amusement park, and an artificial lake. The artificial lake connects to Haikou Bay via a small river with two footbridges. The amusement park, food streets, and various kiosks are located at the southeast corner.

The west end contains parking facilities and some small, outdoor restaurants.

== Gallery ==
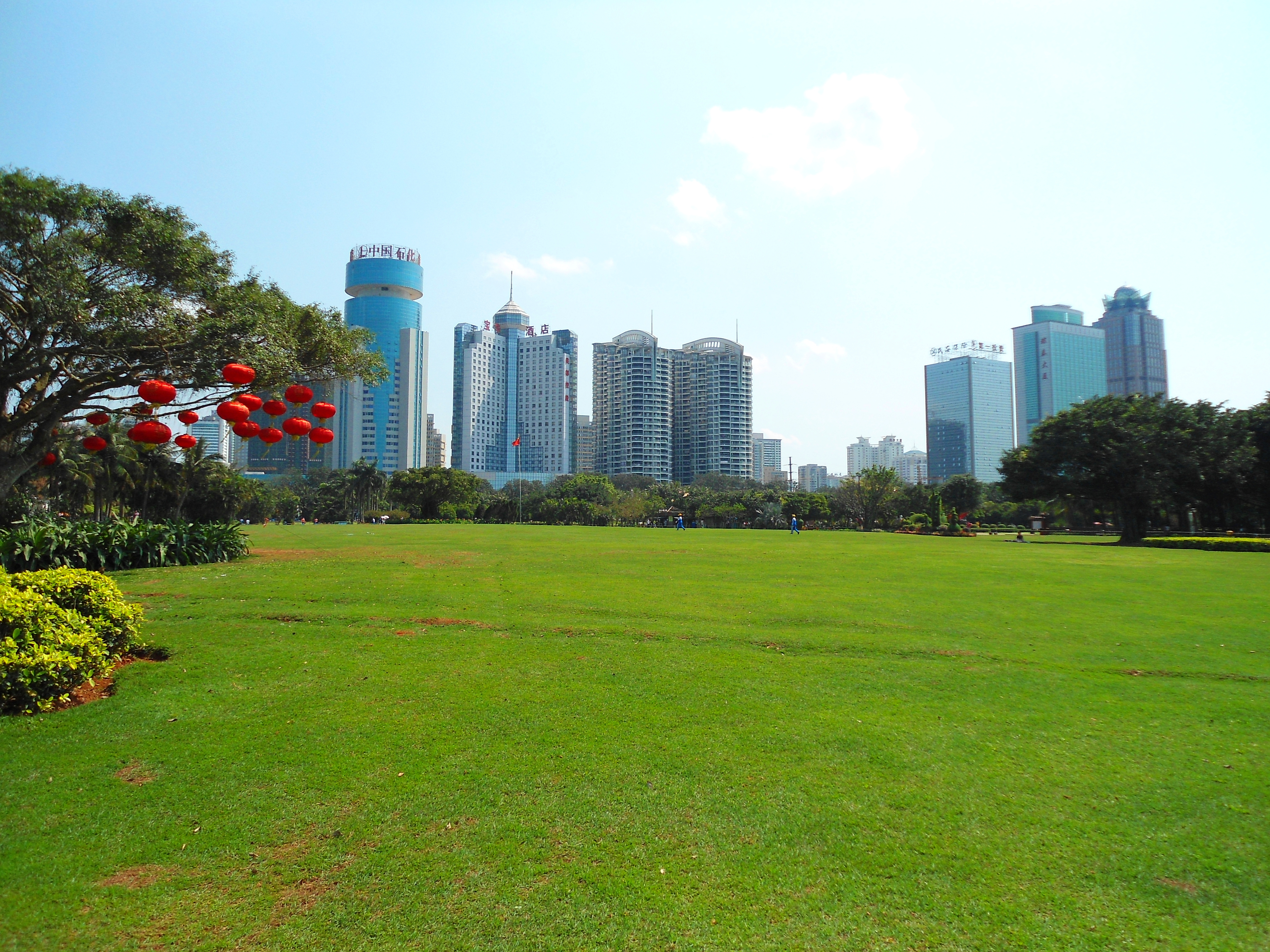
A grassy area

Video panorama

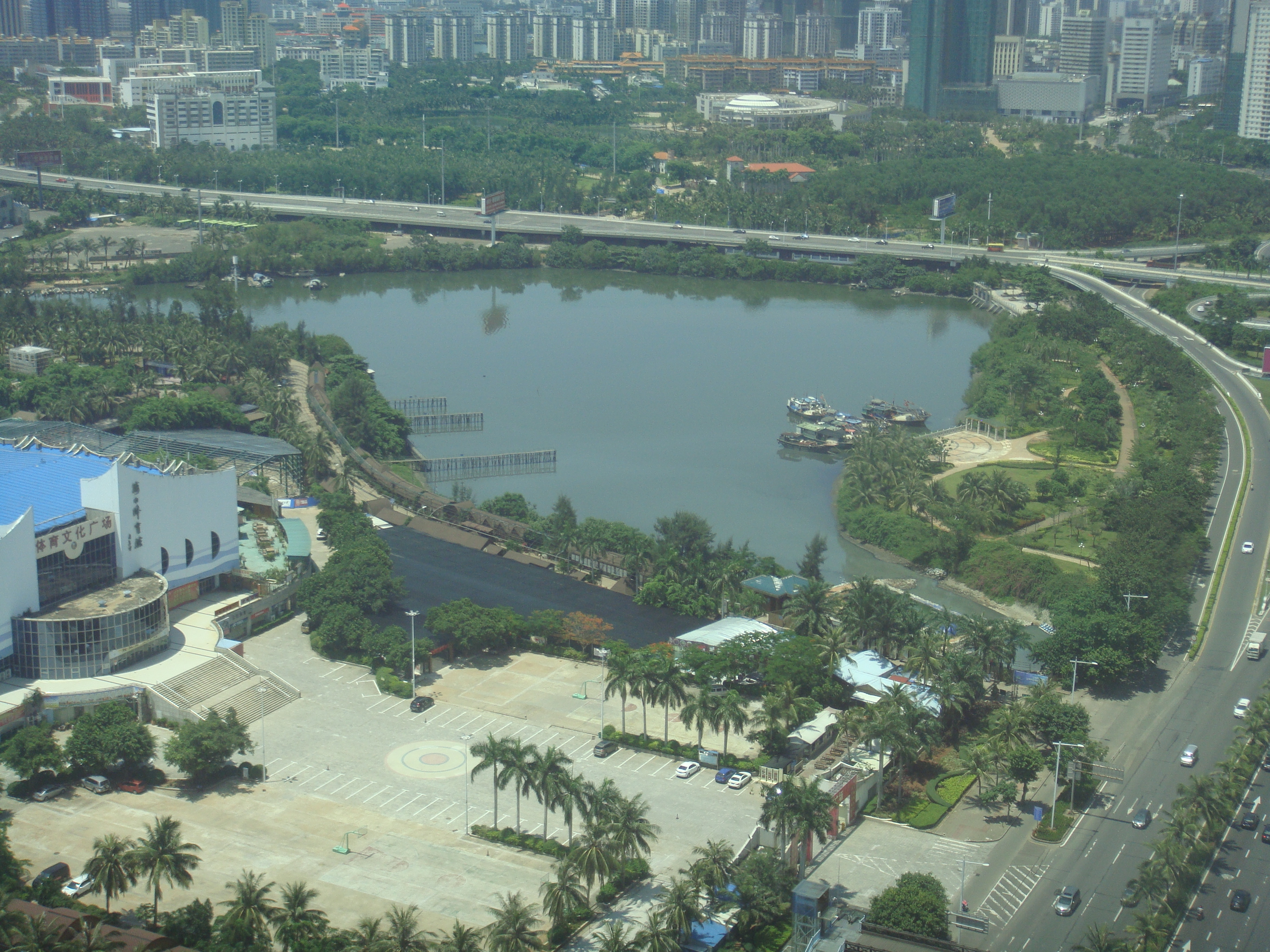
Lagoon at east side

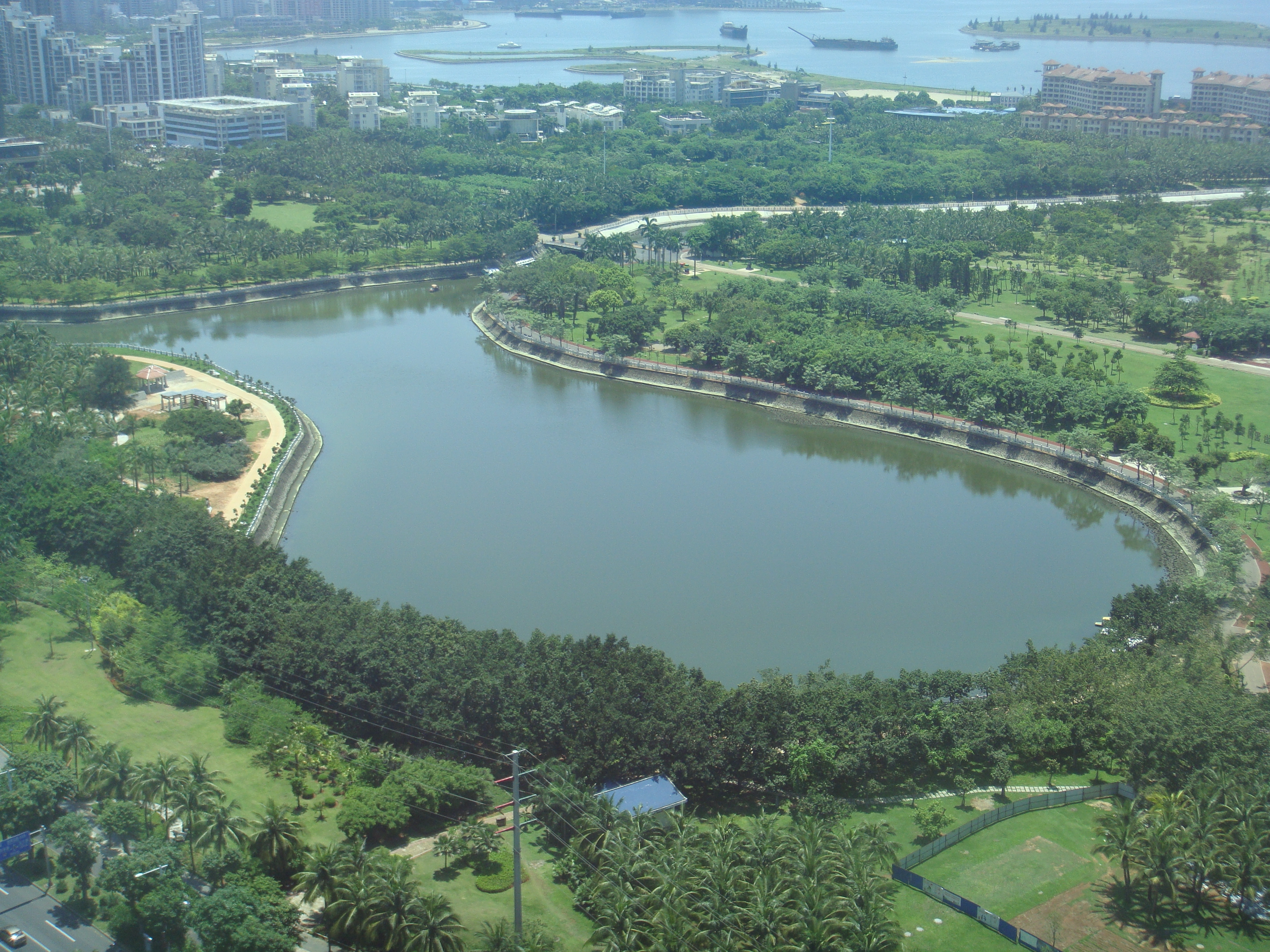
Central lake

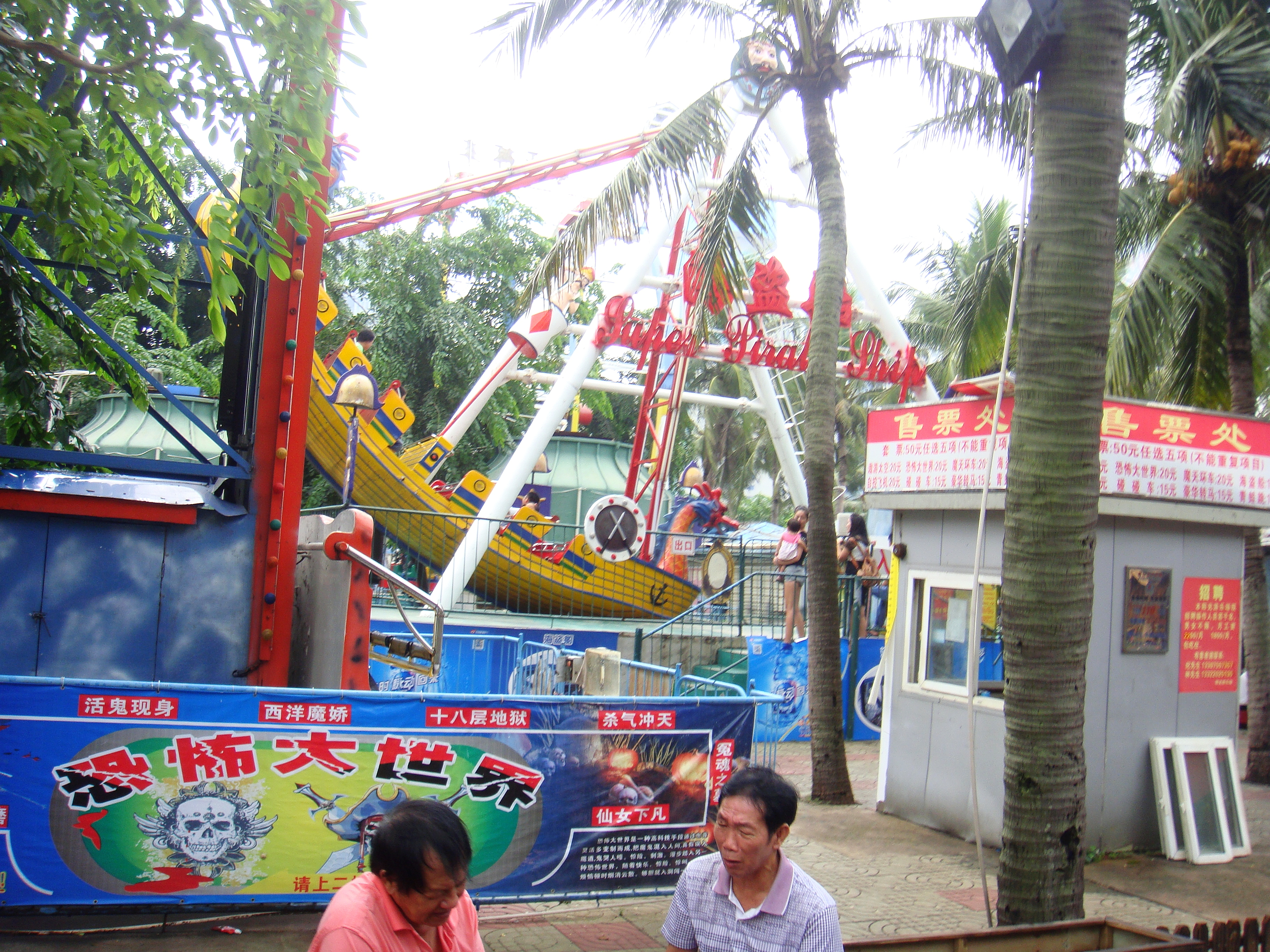
Amusement park

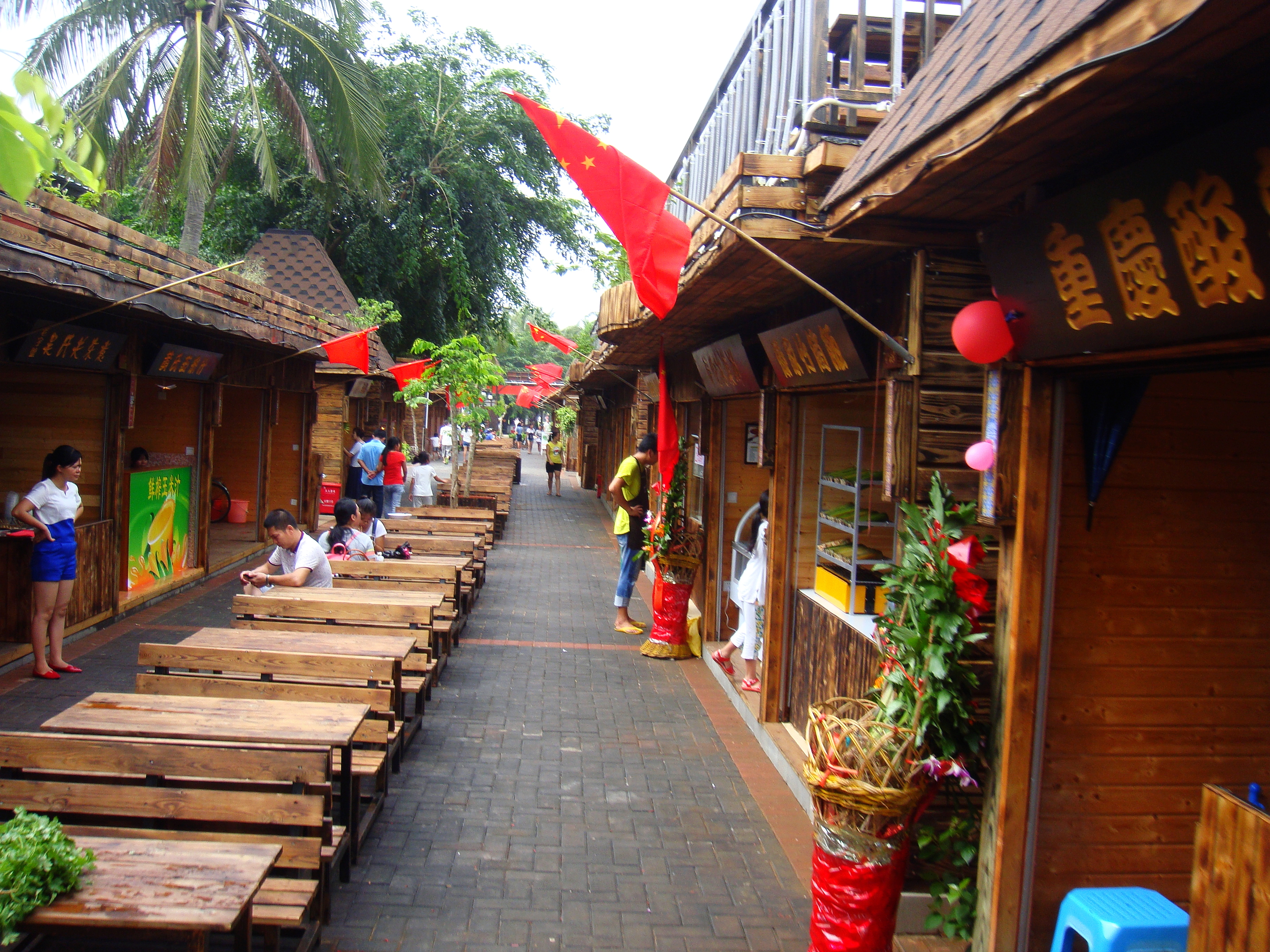
Food concession road at east side
