= Haikou Great Hall of the People =

Coordinates: 20.029824°N 110.304509°E

Haikou Great Hall of the People 海口市人民大会堂
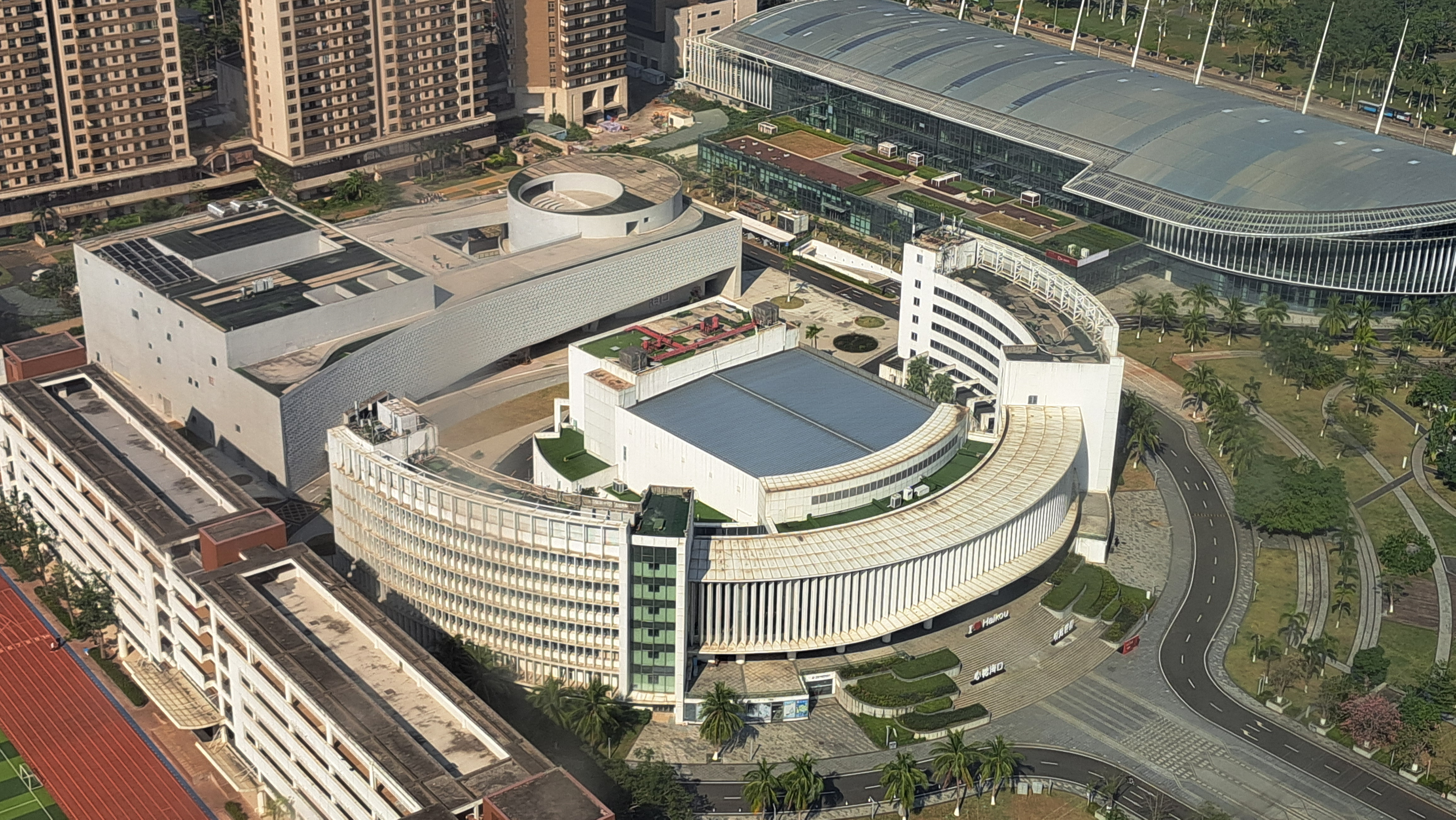
- Haikou Great Hall of the People in December 2025
- Interactive map of the Haikou Great Hall of the People 海口市人民大会堂 area

General information
- Type: Performing arts complex
- Location: Haikou, Hainan, China
- Completed: July 2010
- Opened: December 2007

The Haikou Great Hall of the People (Chinese: 海口市人民大会堂) is a performance venue located adjacent to the west side of Evergreen Park, Haikou City, Hainan Province, China.
