= Feng Baiju =

Chinese general and politician (1903–1973)

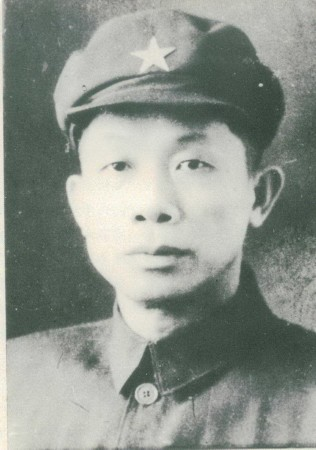

Personal details
- Born: June 7, 1903 Boonsio, Hainan, China
- Died: July 19, 1973 (aged 70) Beijing, People's Republic of China
- Party: Chinese Communist Party
- Awards: August 1 Medal (First Class); Order of Independence and Freedom (First Class); Order of Liberation (First Class)

Military service
- Allegiance: China
- Unit: Qiongya Column
- Battles/wars: Battle of Hainan Island

Feng Baiju (Chinese: 冯白驹; 1903–1973) was the chief leader of the Hainan Independent Column (Qiongya zongdui) of Chinese Communist fighters on the island of Hainan. Feng led the column in resistance to both the Nationalist Kuomintang, and the Japanese.

The Japanese occupation of Hainan lasted from 1939 through 1945. On 25 November 1949, the Overseas Chinese Daily News reported Feng's appointment as Third Deputy Commissar of the Guangdong Military District. The Communist takeover of Hainan did not occur until the spring of 1950 when mainland Communist forces joined with Feng's local column of fighters. A CIA report on 9 May 1952 identified Feng Baiju as a Deputy Chairman of the Hainan Military & Political Committee.

Feng maintained control of political leadership on Hainan for a short time after the Communist takeover, but soon he was removed in favor of leaders who were more palatable to mainland Chinese leaders. He was interrogated several times during the "anti-localism" campaigns of the 1950s, and again during the Cultural Revolution, when he faced political difficulties due to having previously written confessions during imprisonments by the Kuomintang. Ultimately, he was rehabilitated shortly before his death in 1973. Today he is celebrated as one of Hainan's local heroes.
