= Qiongzhou Strait =

Strait separating mainland China from Hainan

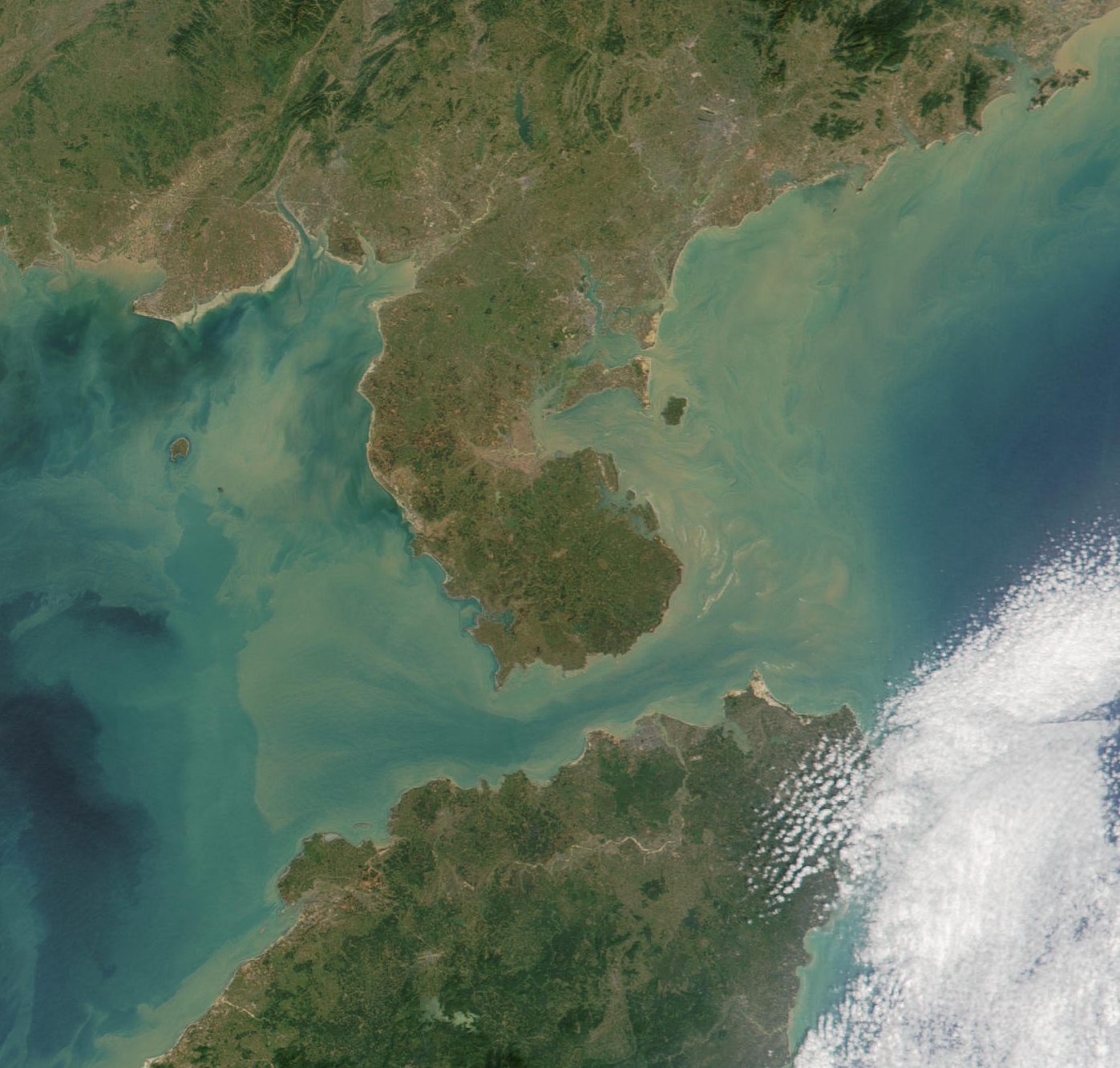
- The Qiongzhou Strait

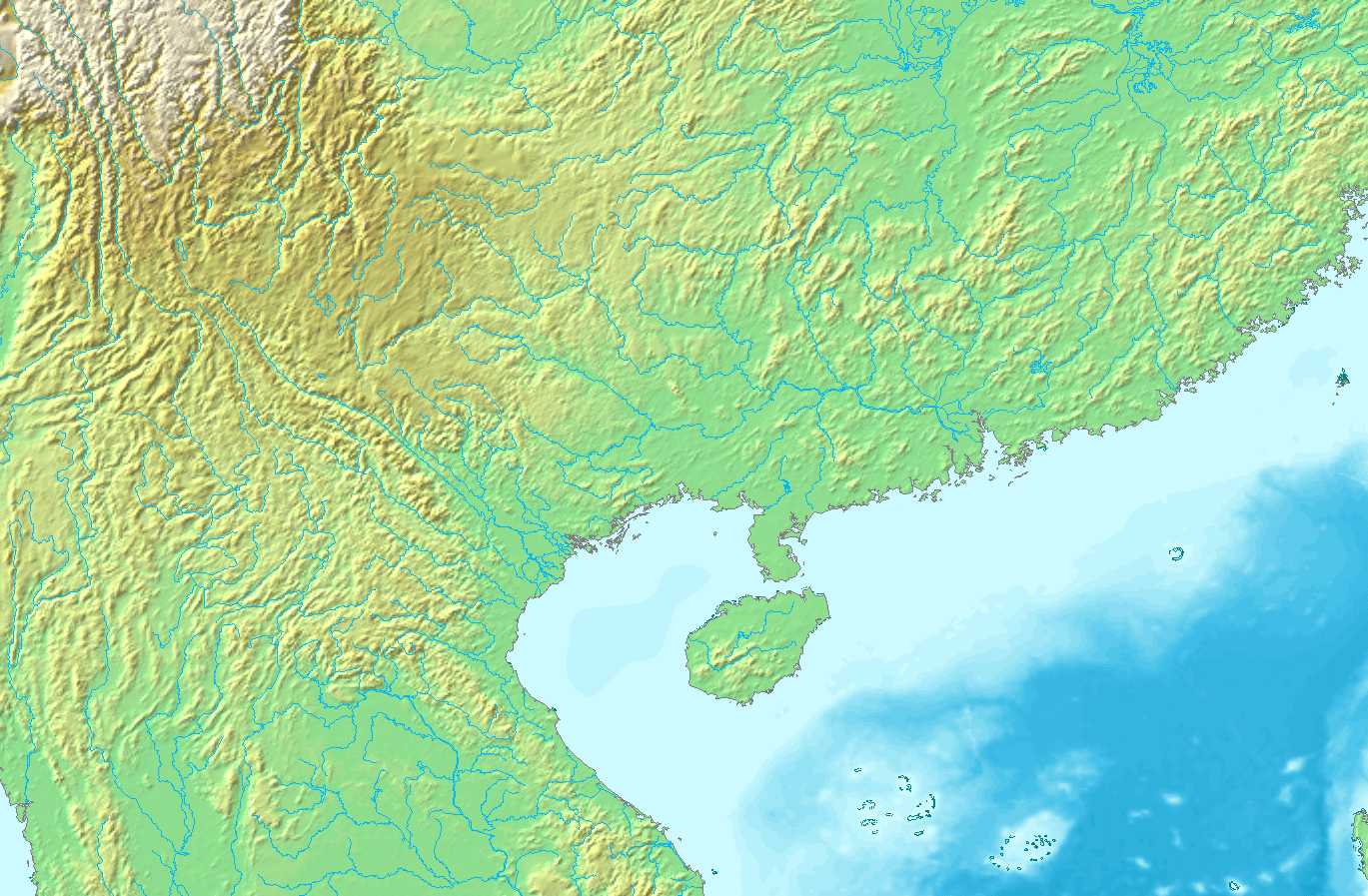
- Location within Southern China
- Coordinates: 20°09′N 110°16′E
- Type: Strait
- Basin countries: China
- Max. width: 30 km (19 mi)
- Max. depth: 120 m (390 ft)

Qiongzhou Strait
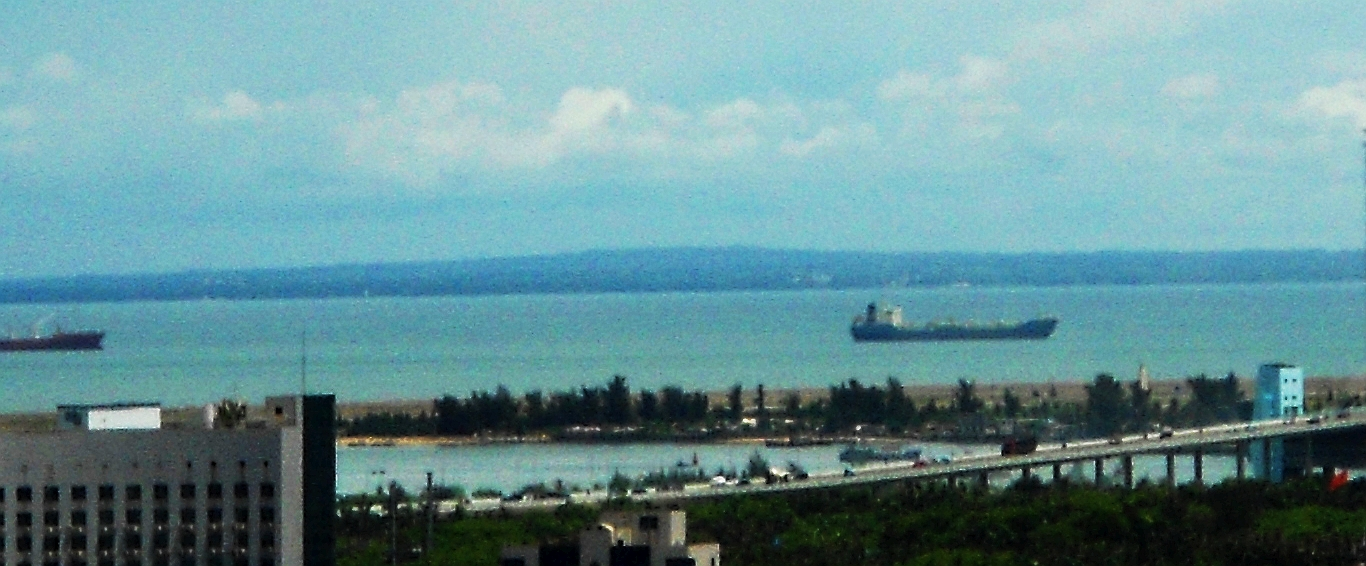
- Qiongzhou Strait with Leizhou Peninsula in background viewed from Haikou on Hainan
- Traditional Chinese: 瓊州海峽
- Simplified Chinese: 琼州海峡
- Postal: Kiungchow Strait
Transcriptions
Standard Mandarin
- Hanyu Pinyin: Qióngzhōu Hǎixiá
- Wade–Giles: Chʻiung-chou Hai-hsia
Southern Min
- Hainanese Romanization: Khāng-tsiú Hái-kiap

The Qiongzhou Strait, also called the Hainan Strait, is the Chinese strait that separates Guangdong's Leizhou Peninsula from the island province of Hainan. It connects the Gulf of Tonkin on its west to the South China Sea on its east. The strait is on average 30 km (19 mi) wide with a maximum water depth of approximately 120 m (390 ft). The strait is susceptible to closure during strong typhoon activity.

Whales and dugongs were once common in the strait.

== History ==
The strait was crossed by the People's Liberation Army forces in the spring of 1950.

== Transportation ==
The Guangdong–Hainan Ferry (part of the Guangdong–Hainan railway) carries rail cars and automotive vehicles across the strait.

While a bridge was planned in the early 2000s, it never came to fruition. A bridge or tunnel has been discussed, as of 2018, as travel by air or ferry can leave residents and visitors isolated when bad weather sets in.

== See also ==
- Haikou, formerly called Qiongzhou
