= Tropical Storm Dianmu (2016) =

Pacific tropical storm in 2016

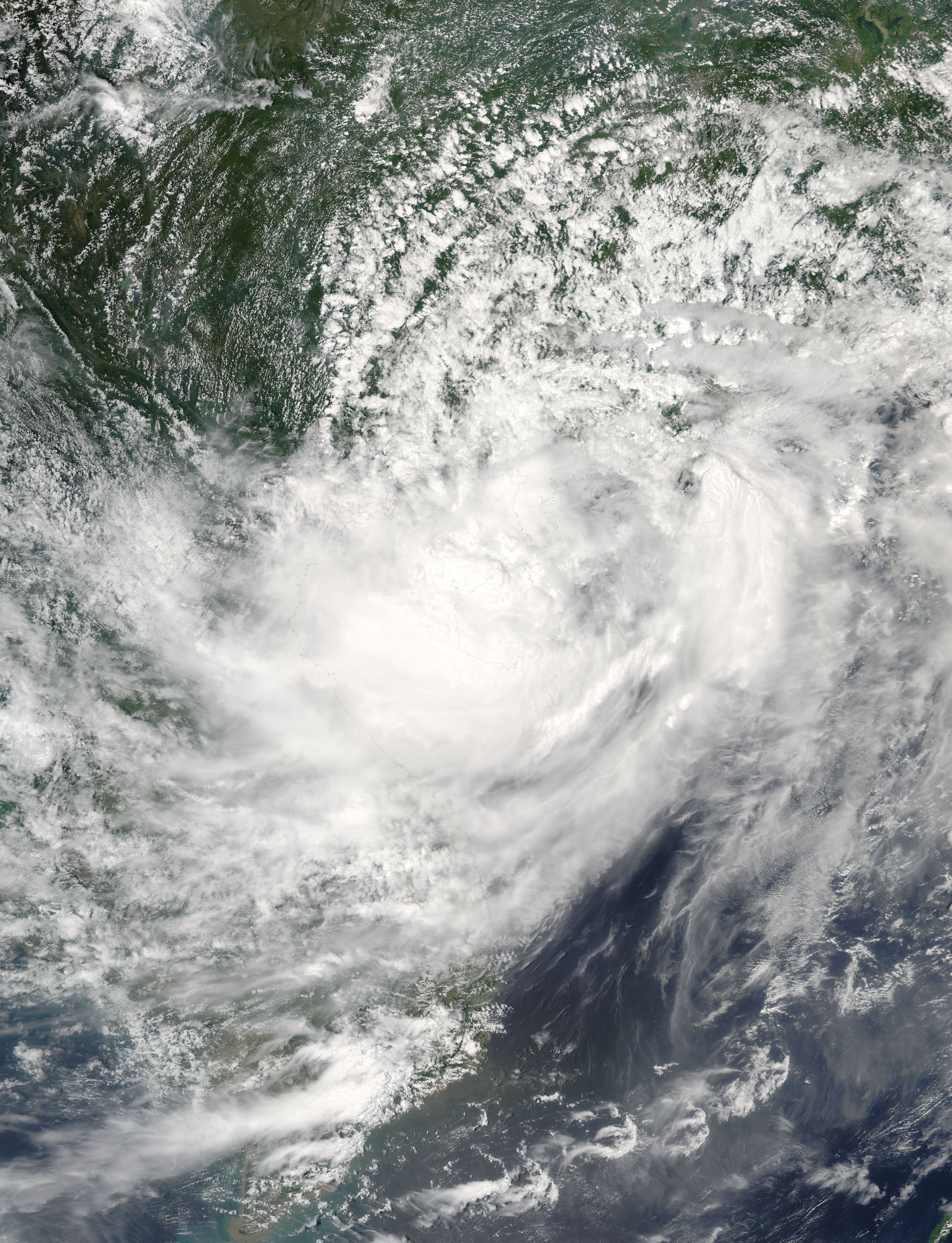
- Tropical Storm Dianmu approaching Leizhou Peninsula on August 18

Meteorological history
- Formed: August 15, 2016
- Remnant low: August 20
- Dissipated: August 21, 2016

Tropical storm
- 10-minute sustained (JMA)
- Highest winds: 75 km/h (45 mph)
- Lowest pressure: 980 hPa (mbar); 28.94 inHg

Tropical storm
- 1-minute sustained (SSHWS/JTWC)
- Highest winds: 85 km/h (50 mph)
- Lowest pressure: 989 hPa (mbar); 29.21 inHg

Overall effects
- Fatalities: 23 total
- Damage: $570 million
- Areas affected: China, Vietnam, Laos, Thailand, Myanmar, Bangladesh, India
- IBTrACS
- Part of the 2016 Pacific typhoon season

Tropical Storm Dianmu was a weak tropical cyclone that struck Leizhou Peninsula, China and Northern Vietnam in mid August 2016. It was the eighth named storm of the annual typhoon season.

== Meteorological history ==
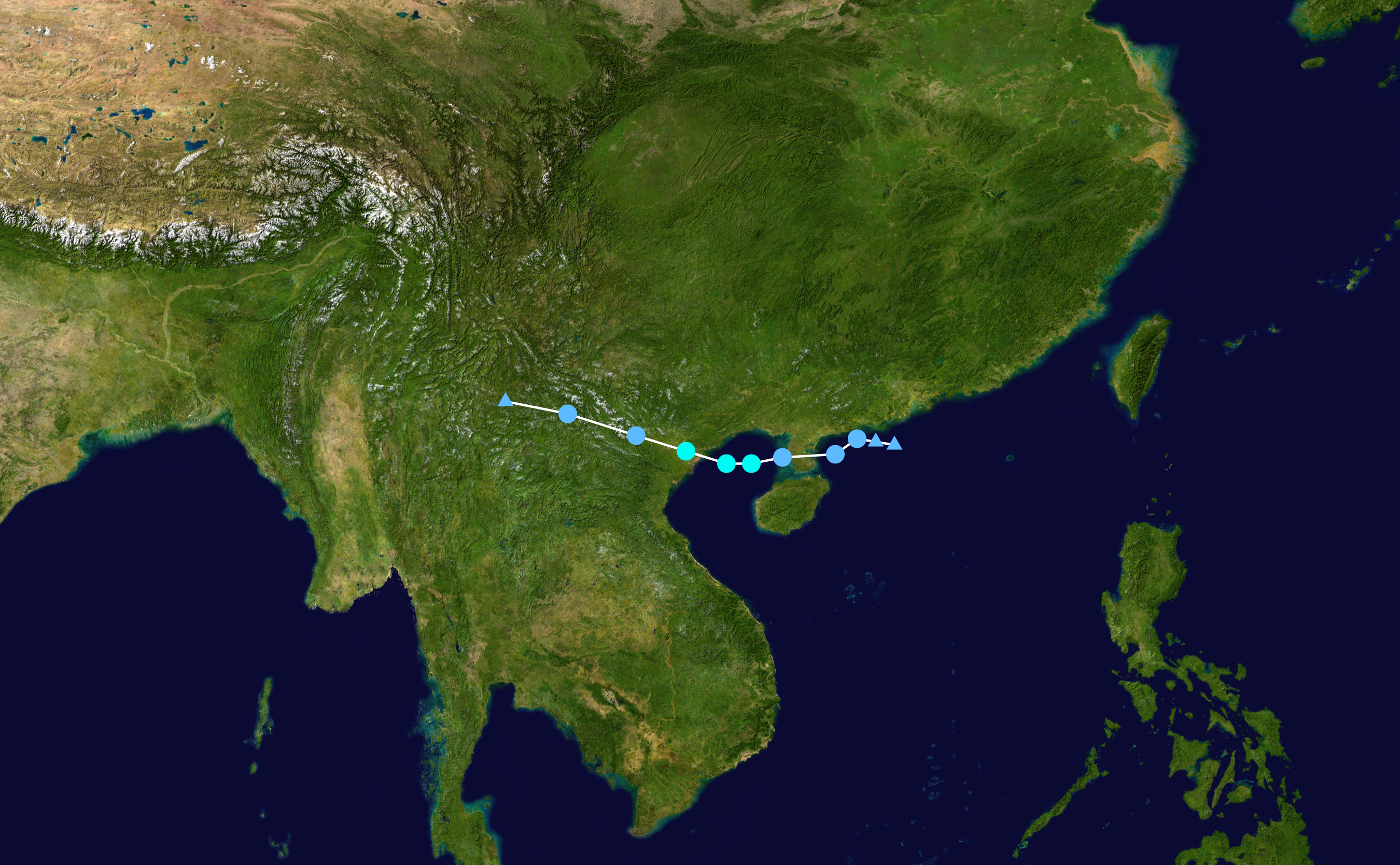
Map plotting the storm's track and intensity, according to the Saffir–Simpson scale Map key Saffir–Simpson scale Tropical depression (≤38 mph, ≤62 km/h) Tropical storm (39–73 mph, 63–118 km/h) Category 1 (74–95 mph, 119–153 km/h) Category 2 (96–110 mph, 154–177 km/h) Category 3 (111–129 mph, 178–208 km/h) Category 4 (130–156 mph, 209–251 km/h) Category 5 (≥157 mph, ≥252 km/h) Unknown Storm type Tropical cyclone Subtropical cyclone Extratropical cyclone, remnant low, tropical disturbance, or monsoon depression

Tropical Storm Dianmu was first noted as a tropical disturbance, by the United States Joint Typhoon Warning Center (JTWC) during August 14, while it was located about 175 km (110 mi) to the south of Hong Kong, China. The disturbance was located within a narrow area of low vertical windshear and had a good outflow. Over the next day the system's low level circulation centre started to consolidate as it moved westwards, before it was classified as a tropical depression by the Japan Meteorological Agency (JMA) during August 15. Over the next couple of days the system moved gradually westwards, before the JTWC issued a tropical cyclone formation alert on the system during August 17.

The depression was upgraded by the JMA to a tropical storm on August 18, being named Dianmu, (Note: The name Dianmu (Mandarin: 电母, [tiɛn˥˩ mu˧˩˧]) was contributed by China and refers to Dianmu, the goddess of lightning in Mandarin.) while the JTWC initiated advisories on the system and classified it as Tropical Depression 11W. After being named, Dianmu continued to move westwards under the influence of a subtropical ridge of high pressure located to the north of the system and made landfall on China's Leizhou Peninsula. The system subsequently entered the Gulf of Tonkin later that day, where it developed an eye feature on microwave imagery, before it peaked with sustained winds of 75 km/h (45 mph) as it made landfall on northern Vietnam during August 19. Over the next day Dianmu gradually weakened as it moved westwards through Vietnam, Laos and China's Yunnan province, before it degenerated into an area of low pressure over northern Myanmar during August 20. The remnant area of low pressure continued to be monitored, as it moved through parts of Myanmar and India, before it was last noted over Bangladesh.

== Preparations and impact ==
=== China ===
Dianmu passed about 220 km (135 mi) to the southwest of Hong Kong, China during August 17, where it generated moderate to fresh easterly winds. As Dianmu moved slowly westwards, local winds over Hong Kong strengthened during that day, before the Strong Wind Signal No. 3 was issued for both territories, by the Hong Kong Observatory and the Macao Meteorological and Geophysical Bureau. Strong winds were subsequently observed over Hong Kong, before all signals were cancelled during August 18.

On Hainan Island, around 40,000 people were evacuated, ahead of the system affecting the island while transportation service were also affected. Heavy rain associated with the system caused flooding in several places over the island, including in parts of the capital Haikou. The heavy rain also brought the water level at the Longtang Dam on the Nandu River to a ten-year high of 13.35 metres (43.8 ft).

In total, Dianmu killed 6 people, and total economic losses in Mainland China were counted to be CN¥3.18 billion (US$480.9 million).

During tropical storm Dianmu, A member of the People's Armed Police Border Defense Corps was killed while rescuing people. He was posthumously awarded the Medal of Devotion for National Defense Second Class.

=== Vietnam ===
Within Vietnam, 17 people were killed, while two others were missing. Over in Quảng Ninh, a total of 11 houses were collapsed. Total damages in the country amounted to 1.99 trillion VND (US$89 million).

== See also ==
- Weather of 2016
- Tropical cyclones in 2016
- Typhoon Hope (1979)
- Tropical Storm Zita (1997)
- Tropical Storm Soudelor (2009)
- Tropical Storm Mujigae (2009)
- Tropical Storm Bebinca (2013)
