= Hainan International Friendship Park =

Park in Haikou, China

Coordinates: 20.033637°N 110.37569°E

Hainan International Friendship Park 海南国际友好公园
- Interactive map of Hainan International Friendship Park 海南国际友好公园
- Type: Urban park
- Location: Haikou City, Hainan Province, China
- Status: Open all year

The Hainan International Friendship Park (Chinese: 海南国际友好公园) is an under-construction park located on the west bank of the Nandu River, by Sima Slope Island, in Haikou City, Hainan Province, China.
