= Simapo Island =

Island in the Nandu River, China

Coordinates: 20.010452°N 110.380669°E

Simapo Island 海口司马坡岛
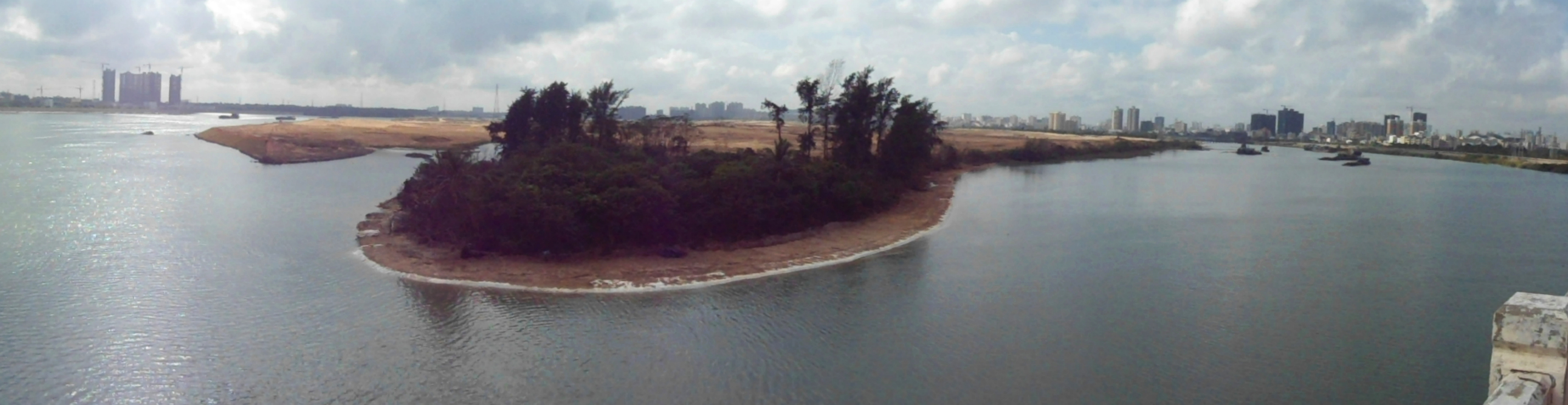
- The northern tip of Simapo Island

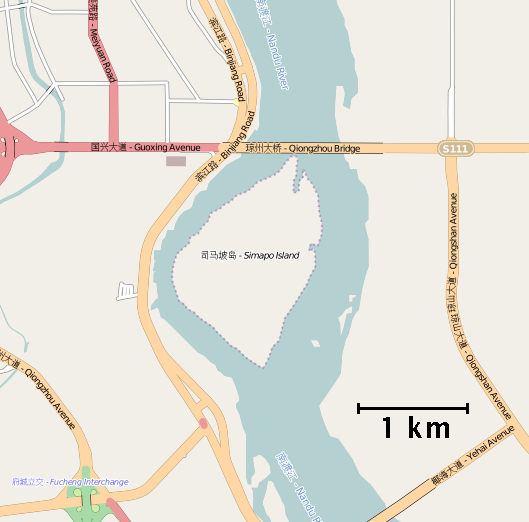

Geography
- Location: Nandu River, Haikou, Hainan
- Total islands: 1
- Area: 1.134 km^{2} (0.438 sq mi)

Administration
- People's Republic of China

Demographics
- Population: 0

Simapo Island (海口司马坡岛) is located in the Nandu River, Haikou, Hainan, China. It is currently under development.

The 1.134 km^{2} island is located approximately 50 metres south of the Qiongzhou Bridge, and 5 km north of the Nandu River Iron Bridge. It will be developed with an emphasis on sports facilities, and will include a sports park and golf course. Garden-style hotels and several bars will also be constructed.
