= Yang Sitao =

Chinese politician

- 杨思涛

Chairman of the Board and Party Secretary of Haiken Group
- In office June 2017 – April 2019
- Preceded by: Zhang Yunsheng
- Succeeded by: Gai Wenqi

Communist Party Secretary of Chengmai County
- In office May 2008 – May 2017
- Preceded by: Zhang Zuorong
- Succeeded by: Ji Zhaomin

Magistrate of Chengmai County
- In office March 2005 – May 2008
- Preceded by: Huo Juran
- Succeeded by: Chen Xiaobo

Personal details
- Born: November 1964 (age 61) Dabu County, Guangdong, China
- Party: Chinese Communist Party (expelled; 1989-2020)
- Education: Guangdong Petrochemical College; Fudan University

Chinese name
- Traditional Chinese: 楊思濤
- Simplified Chinese: 杨思涛
Transcriptions
Standard Mandarin
- Hanyu Pinyin: Yáng Sītāo

Yang Sitao (Chinese: 杨思涛; born November 1964) is a former Chinese politician who spent most of his career in Hainan province. He entered the workforce in July 1985, and joined the Chinese Communist Party in June 1989. He was investigated by the Chinese Communist Party's anti-graft agency in April 2019. Previously he served as chairman of the board and Party secretary of Haiken Group, a large state-owned agricultural enterprise. Prior to that, he was Party secretary of Chengmai County between May 2008 and May 2017.

== Early life and education ==
Yang was born in Dabu County, Guangdong in November 1964. After the resumption of college entrance examination, he was accepted to Guangdong Petrochemical College. He was a Ph.D. candidate at Fudan University from February 2005 and January 2008.

== Career ==
After graduating in July 1985, he was assigned to the Western South China Sea Company, a branch of the CNOOC Limited. He spent 15 years working at the Western South China Sea Company before moving to Chengmai County, where he was appointed deputy magistrate there. In March 2003 he became the deputy Communist Party secretary of Chengmai County, rising to Communist Party secretary in May 2008. He concurrently served as magistrate of Chengmai County between December 2004 and May 2008. In June 2017 he became chairman of the board and Party secretary of Hainan State Farms Investment Holding Group Co, Ltd. (Haiken Group), a large state-owned agricultural enterprise in Hainan province.

== Investigation ==
In April 2019, Yang has been placed under investigation for serious violations of laws and regulations by the Central Commission for Discipline Inspection (CCDI), the party's internal disciplinary body, and the National Supervisory Commission, the highest anti-corruption agency of China. On November 18, 2019, the First Intermediate People's Court of Hainan opened a court session to hear his case, the indictment accused him of taking bribes of over 338 million yuan (about 48.1235 million U.S. dollars).

On July 23, 2020, he was expelled from the Chinese Communist Party (CCP) and dismissed from public office.

Government offices
Preceded by Huo Juran (霍巨燃)	Magistrate of Chengmai County; 2005-2008	Succeeded by Chen Xiaobo (陈笑波)
Party political offices
Preceded by Zhang Zuorong (张作荣)	Communist Party Secretary of Chengmai County; 2008-2017	Succeeded by Ji Zhaomin (吉兆民)
Business positions
Preceded by Zhang Yunsheng (张韵声)	Chairman of the board and Party Secretary of Haiken Group; 201-2019	Succeeded by Gai Wenqi (盖文启)
