= Old Iron Bridge =

Old Iron Bridge way refer to:

== Bridges ==
- Nandu River Iron Bridge, in Haikou, Hainan, China
- Old Iron Bridge, in Bastrop, Texas, US
