= Haikou New East Bridge =

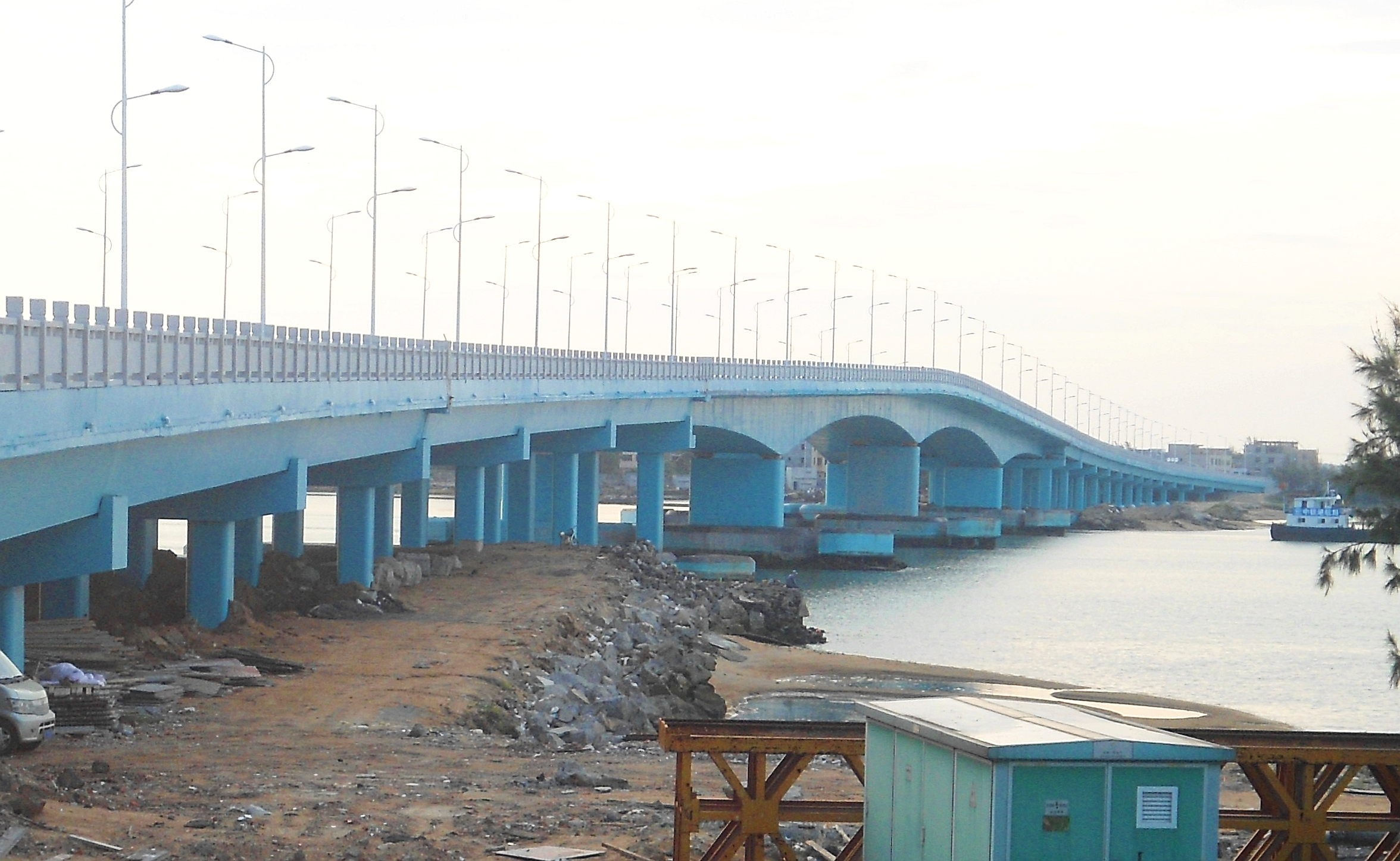
- A view from the southwest
- Coordinates: 20°04′09″N 110°22′25″E
- Crosses: Nandu River
- Locale: Xinbu Island, Hainan, China

Characteristics
- Design: arch bridge

History
- Opened: 2014

Location
- Interactive map of Haikou New East Bridge

Haikou New East Bridge (Chinese: 海口新东大桥; pinyin: Hǎikǒu Xīndōng Qiáo) is an arch bridge over the Nandu River, Hainan, China. It connects Xinbu Island at the west to Dongying town and the rest of the province at the east.

The western end of the bridge connects to a new east-west road, part of Haidian No. 5 East Road, that cuts across Xinbu Island. This road is a prominent feature of the island, and connects this bridge to the Xinbu Bridge at the west of Xinbu Island. It allows traffic to go from Haidian Island, through Xinbu Island, and across the Haikou New East Bridge to the rest of the province in a nearly straight line via this wide, main road.

== Specifications ==
This two-way bridge is 908 meters long and 30.5 metres wide. The automobile lanes are each 11.25 metres wide. The raised pedestrian sidewalks are 1.5 metres wide and the motorbike lanes, separated from the automobile traffic lanes for safety, are 2.5 metres wide. Down the centre of the bridge is a low, metal, physical barrier to separate the automobile lanes.

The overall bridge span between the two banks is made up of two sets of three 32-metre-long box girders linked to four single-beam sections of 60, 90, 90 and 60 metres in length, which in turn connect to two sets of four 32-metre-long box girders joined to five 32-metre-long box girders.

The speed limit is 60 kilometres per hour.
