= Tropical Storm Bebinca (2013) =

Pacific tropical storm in 2013

Tropical Storm Bebinca (Fabian)
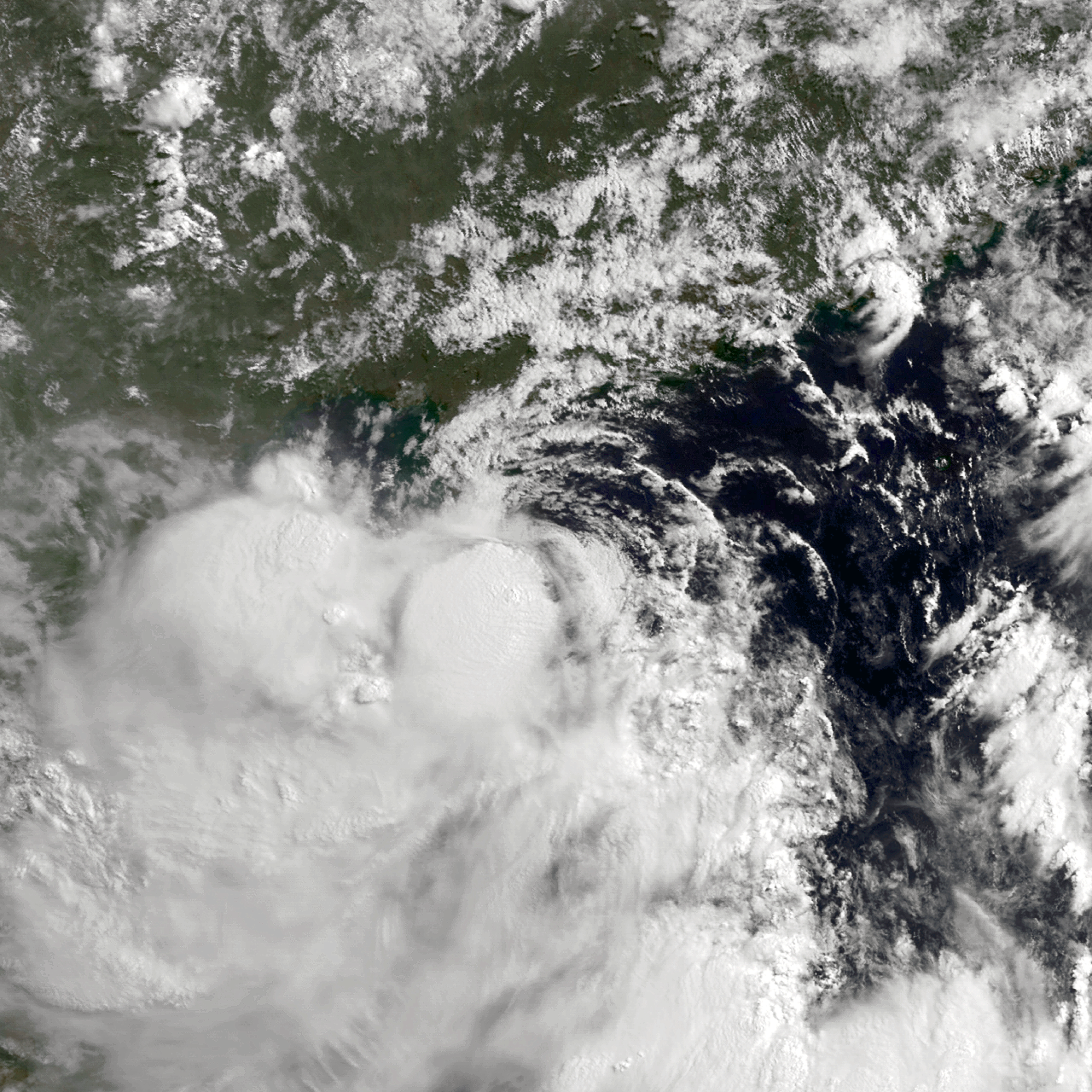
- Tropical Storm Bebinca at peak intensity near Hainan on June 22

Meteorological history
- Formed: June 19, 2013
- Dissipated: June 24, 2013

Tropical storm
- 10-minute sustained (JMA)
- Highest winds: 65 km/h (40 mph)
- Lowest pressure: 990 hPa (mbar); 29.23 inHg

Tropical storm
- 1-minute sustained (SSHWS/JTWC)
- Highest winds: 75 km/h (45 mph)
- Lowest pressure: 996 hPa (mbar); 29.41 inHg

Overall effects
- Fatalities: 1 total
- Missing: 2
- Damage: $58.13 million (2013 USD)
- Areas affected: China, Philippines, Hong Kong, Macau, Vietnam
- IBTrACS
- Part of the 2013 Pacific typhoon season

Tropical Storm Bebinca, (Note: The name Bebinca was contributed by Macau and refers to a kind of milk pudding popular there.) known in the Philippines as Tropical Depression Fabian, was a weak tropical cyclone that brought minor damage in China and Vietnam, causing a death and an economic loss of about US$13 million. The sixth depression and fifth named storm of the season. Bebinca originated as a low-pressure area south of Hong Kong. As the disturbance is moving westward, favorable conditions allow the system to organize into a tropical depression. On June 21, the depression was upgraded into a tropical storm despite the wind shear, which generated by a subtropical ridge.

Bebinca slightly weakened back into a depression and made landfall over Hainan. It remained as a depression as it enters Gulf of Tonkin. Bebinca made its final landfall over Hanoi before finally dissipated on June 24.

== Meteorological history ==
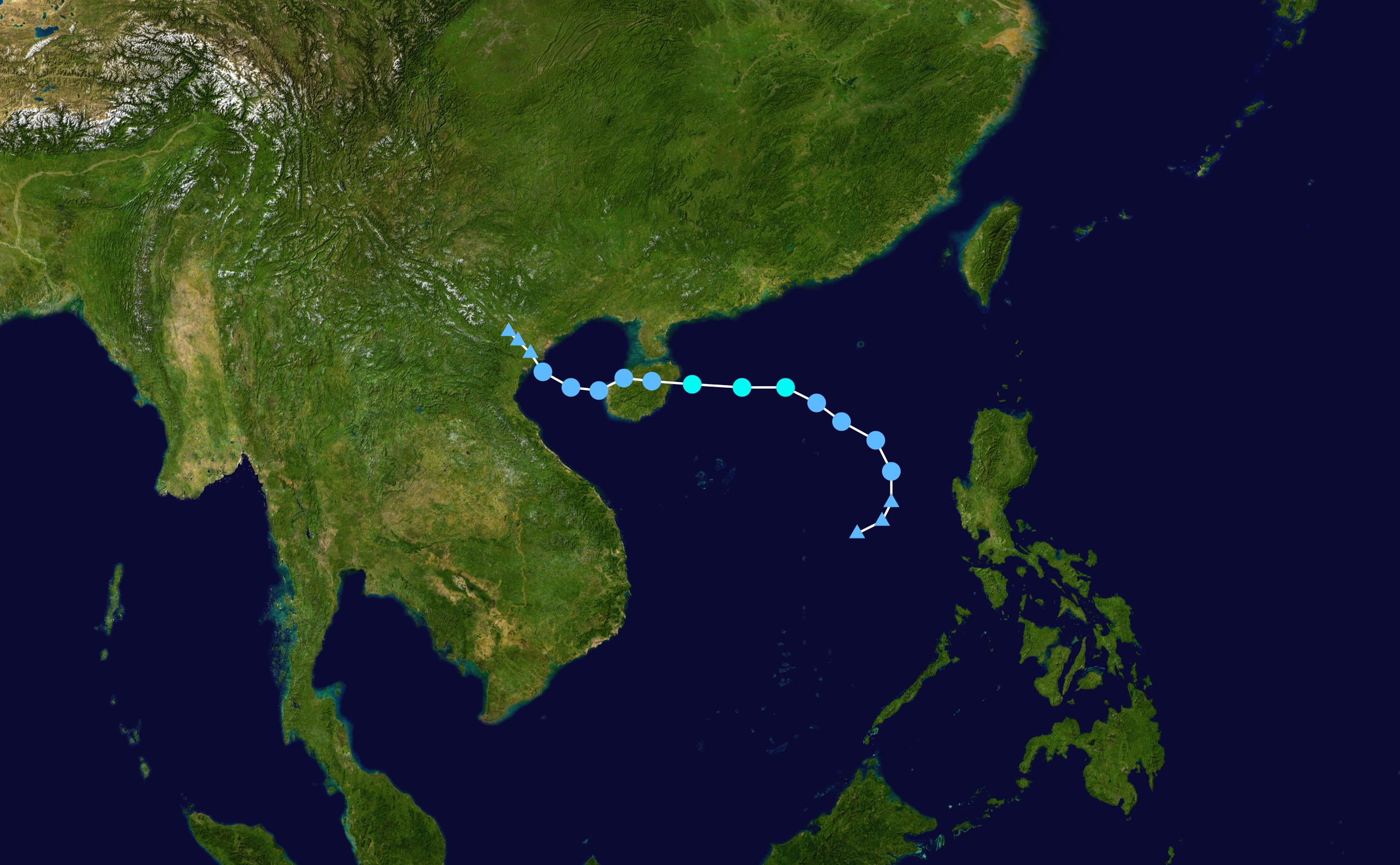
Map plotting the storm's track and intensity, according to the Saffir–Simpson scale Map key Saffir–Simpson scale Tropical depression (≤38 mph, ≤62 km/h) Tropical storm (39–73 mph, 63–118 km/h) Category 1 (74–95 mph, 119–153 km/h) Category 2 (96–110 mph, 154–177 km/h) Category 3 (111–129 mph, 178–208 km/h) Category 4 (130–156 mph, 209–251 km/h) Category 5 (≥157 mph, ≥252 km/h) Unknown Storm type Tropical cyclone Subtropical cyclone Extratropical cyclone, remnant low, tropical disturbance, or monsoon depression

In mid-June, strong but disorganized convection persisted in the South China Sea approximately 1,110 km (690 mi) south of Hong Kong. The disturbance gradually organized, and was classified as a tropical depression by the Japan Meteorological Agency (JMA) at 1800 UTC on June 19; The Philippine Atmospheric, Geophysical and Astronomical Services Administration (PAGASA) followed suit six hours later, naming the system Fabian. Despite wind shear generated by a subtropical ridge, the depression maintained a well-defined circulation, allowing the system to intensify. At 0000 UTC on June 21, the JMA upgraded the cyclone to Tropical Storm Bebinca. Following this upgrade in strength, however, Bebinca leveled out in intensity prior to making landfall on Hainan on June 22. Bebinca's passage weakened the system to tropical depression strength, and, despite moving over the Gulf of Tonkin, failed to restrengthen before making its final landfall on June 23 east of Hanoi.

== Impact ==
=== Hainan ===
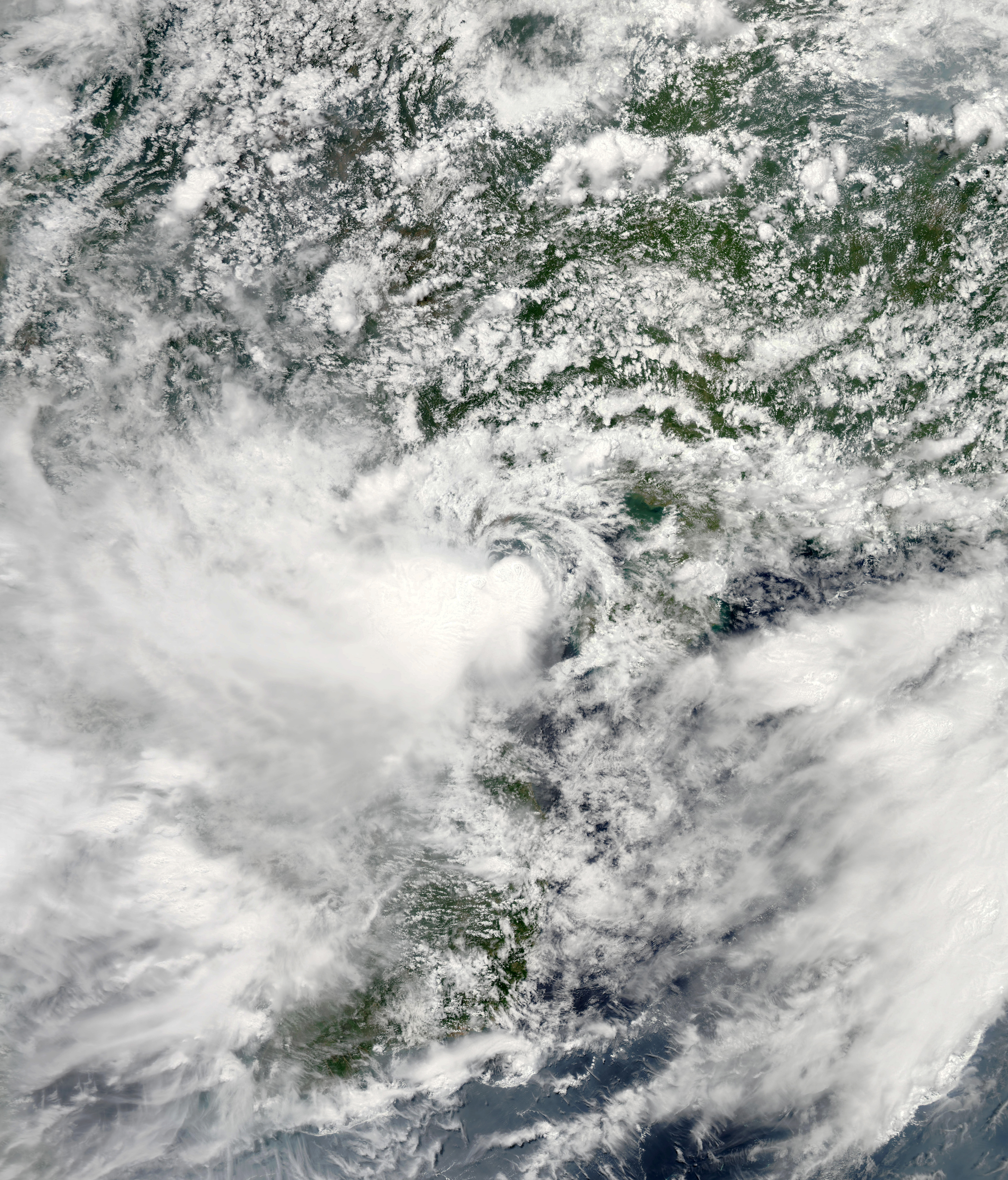
Tropical Storm Bebinca near landfall in Vietnam on June 23

Sanya Phoenix International Airport cancelled 110 flights and delayed another 37, affecting and stranding 8 thousand passengers. In Beibu Bay, a fishing boat with four fishermen on board became unable to contact land, but were found the subsequent day. Rainfall in Hainan peaked at 227 mm (8.9 in) in Sanya. A total of 21.7 million people were affected, and damage amounted to ¥10 million (US$1.63 million).

=== Vietnam ===
Several provinces in Northern Vietnam experienced heavy rainfall due to the passage of Bebinca. In Hon Dau, a gust of 26 metres per second (95 km/h; 60 mph) was recorded. Rainfall peaked at 208 mm (8.2 in) in Ninh Bình. The agricultural industry was the most severely affected due to damage inflicted to 4,600 hectares (11,000 acres) of marine ponds. Economic losses of VND 1.19 trillion (US$56.5 million) were recorded. Floods in Nghệ An Province killed one person; two others went missing.

== See also ==
- Tropical Storm Jebi (2013)
- Tropical Storm Kujira (2015)
- Tropical Storm Dianmu (2016)
