= Haikou Nandu River Water Diversion Project =

Irrigation project in Hainan, China

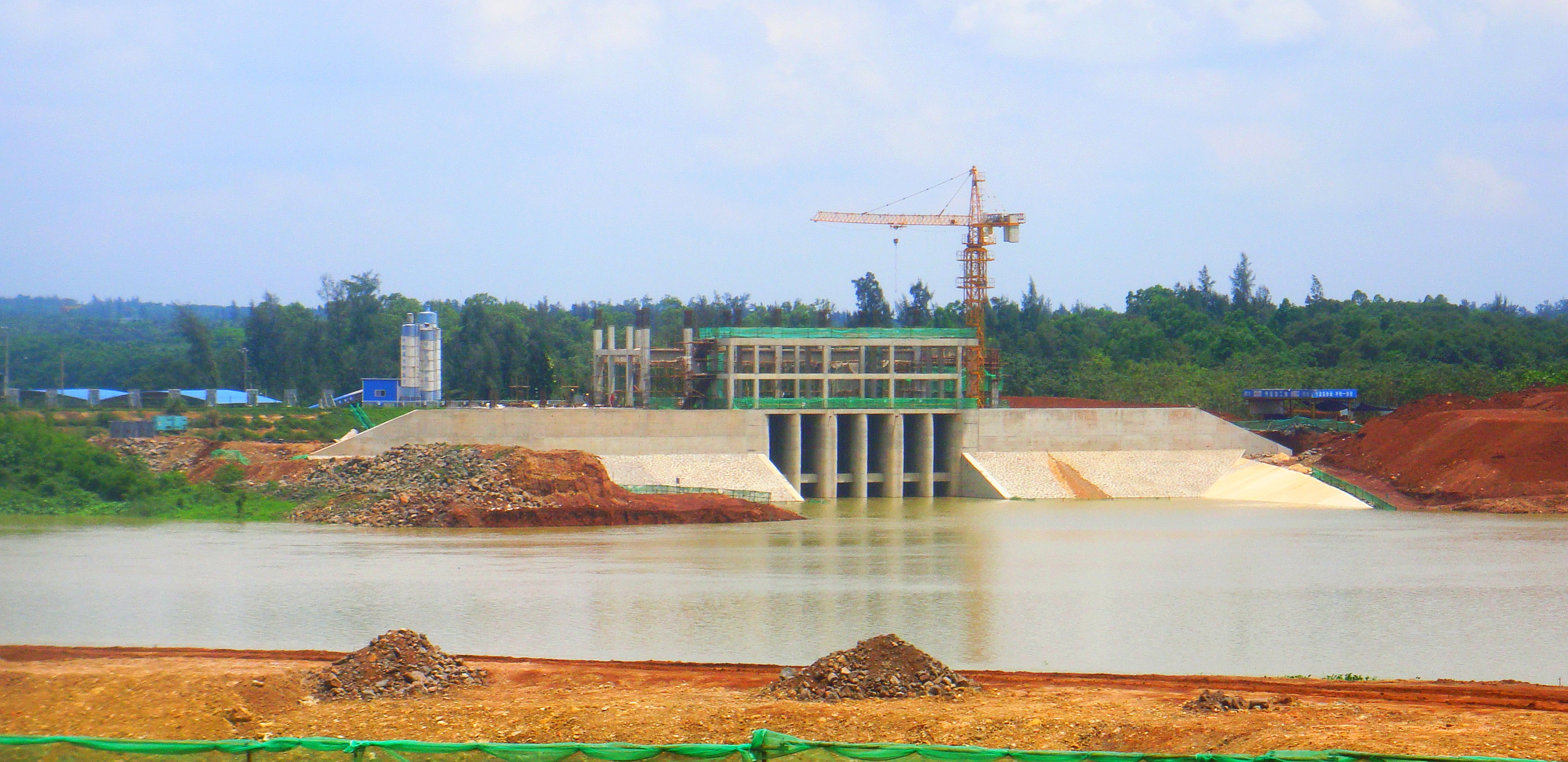
Pumping station under construction, the source of the diverted water, May 2018

Haikou Nandu River Water Diversion Project (Chinese: 海口南渡江引水工程) is a project to divert water from the Nandu River to parts of Haikou Prefecture, in particular, an agricultural area west of Haikou City where lychee are grown.

== Tunnel construction ==
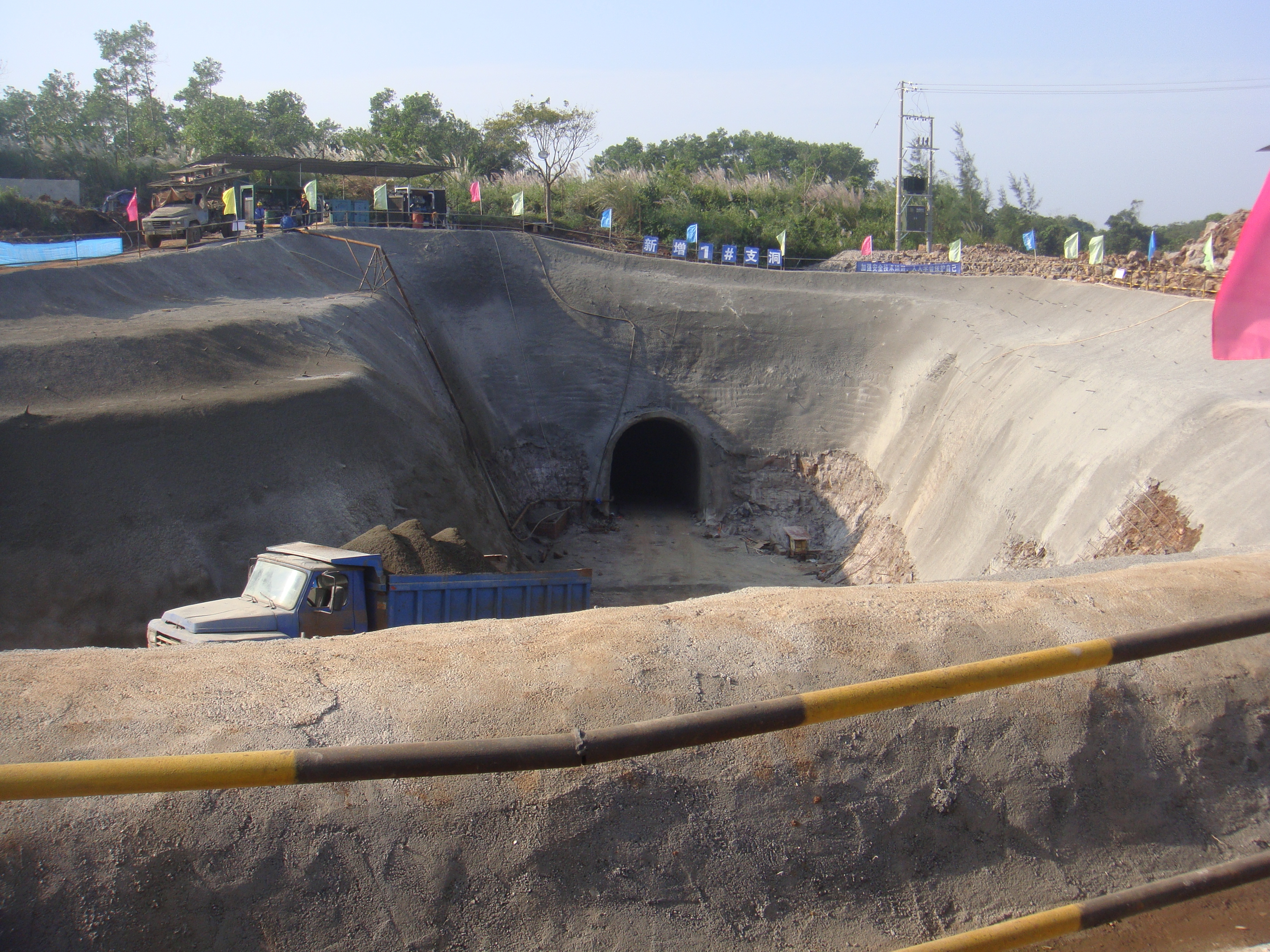
One of the many access pit showing tunnel

The project is ongoing in 2017 and includes a pumping station on the east bank of the Nandu River just south of the Longtang Dam. Tunnels are being bored from the west side of the Nandu westward to the areas where the water is needed. This involves underground blasting and the creation of numerous pits along the route for equipment access.
