= Xinbu Island =

Island in Hainan, China

Native name: 新埠岛
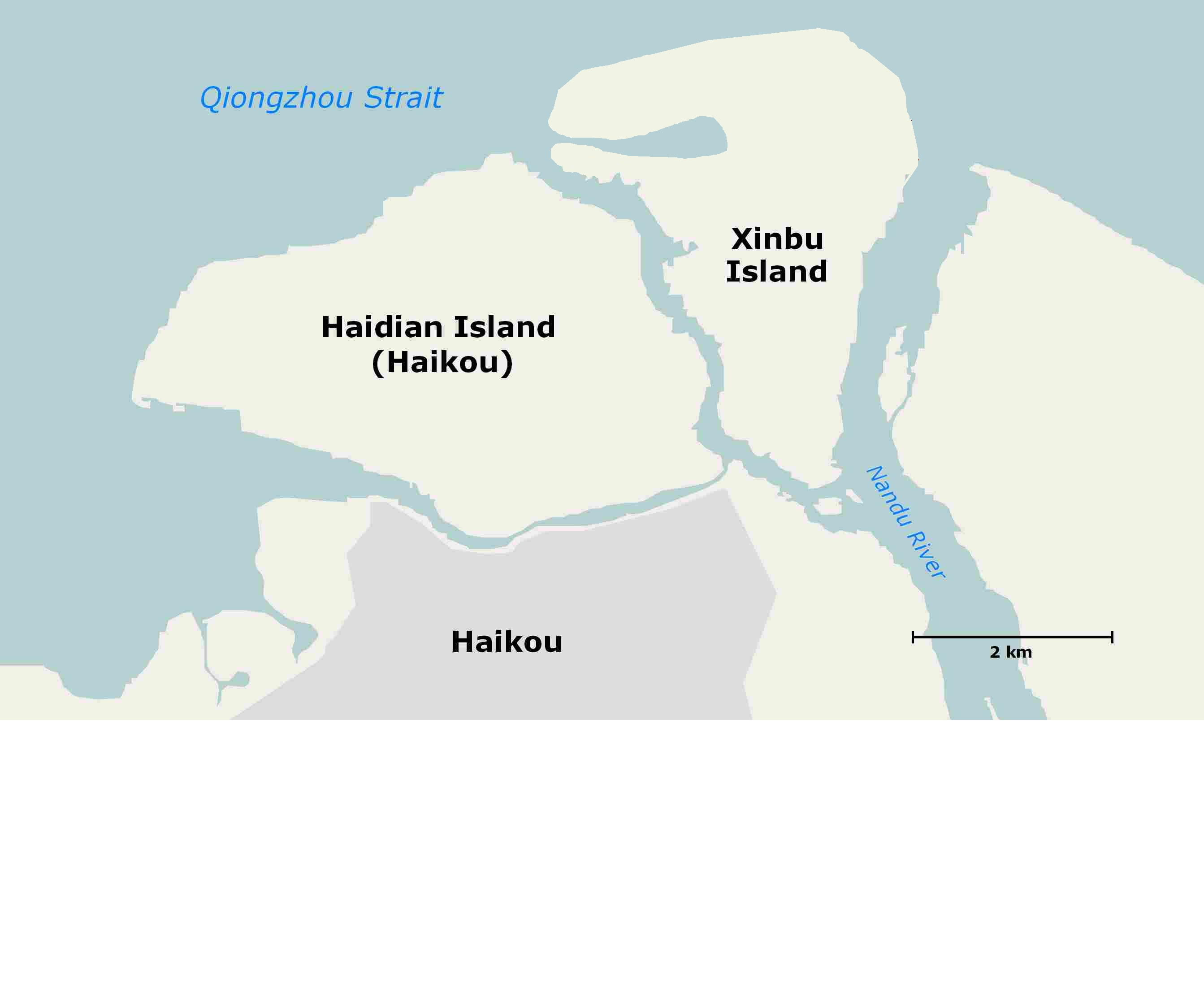

- Location within China

Geography
- Coordinates: 20°07′33″N 110°36′24″E

Administration
- China
- Province: Hainan
- City: Haikou

Xinbu Island (Chinese: 新埠岛) is a coastal island located directly to the east of Haidian Island in Haikou, Hainan, China. This island, located at the mouth of the Nandu River, has a population of approximately 4,000 people. Xinbu Island effectively splits the Nandu River as it flows north to the sea. The main part of the river flows along the east coast of the island while the Huanggou Channel, a distributary, flows along the west coast.

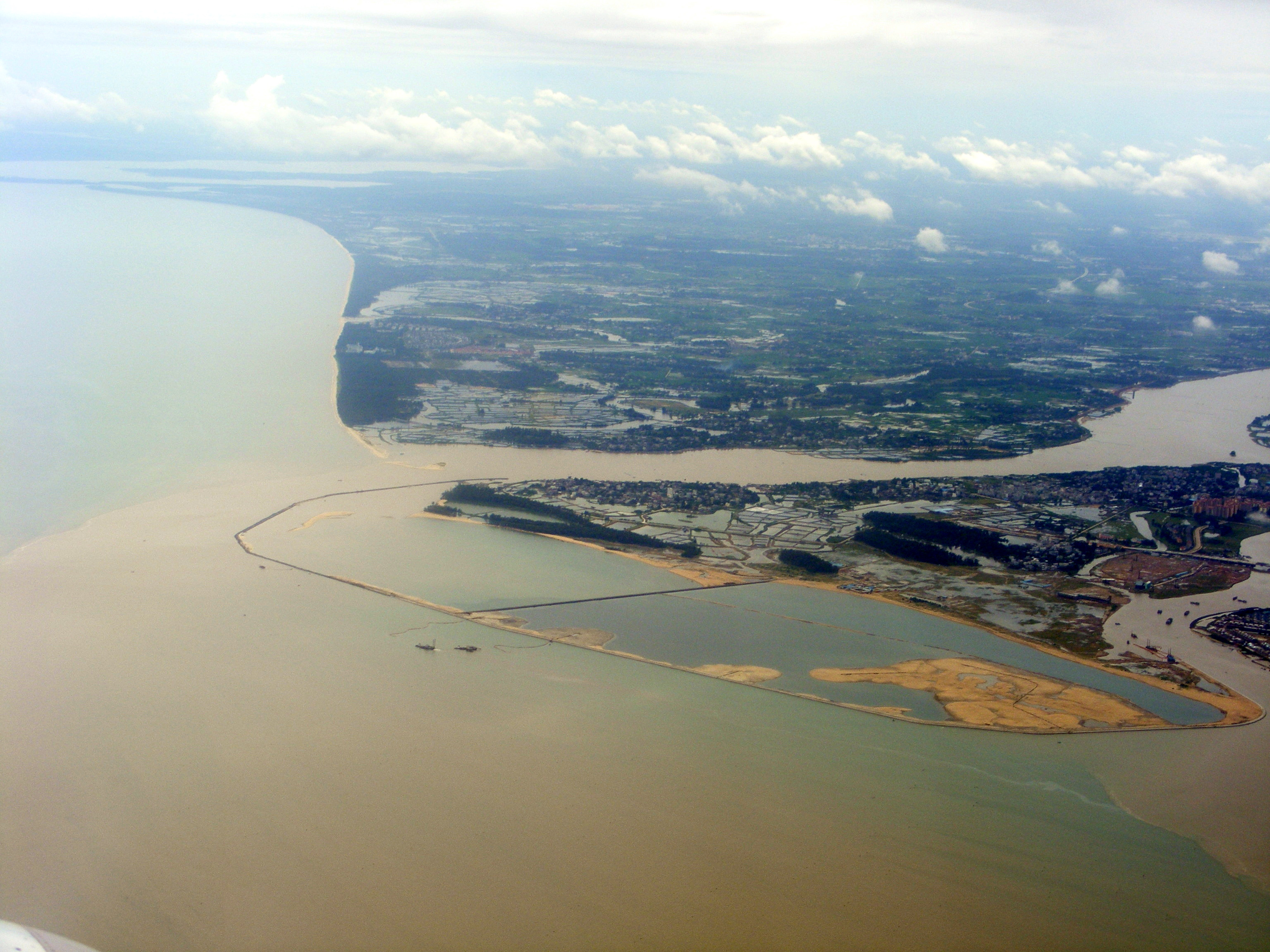
2009 aerial view from the northwest showing the beginning of land reclamation at north end (left portion)

Almost the entire island is populated, and developed in a similar way to suburban Haikou, with the highest density being the east side. There are dozens of small temples located within this residential area. A large strip along the western part has been developed into luxury homes. The northern part of the island is undergoing land reclamation and development. This area comprises the entire northern coast and is composed of sand and earth surrounded by a seawall to prevent erosion. Adjacent to this, to the south, are dozens of fish and shrimp farms.

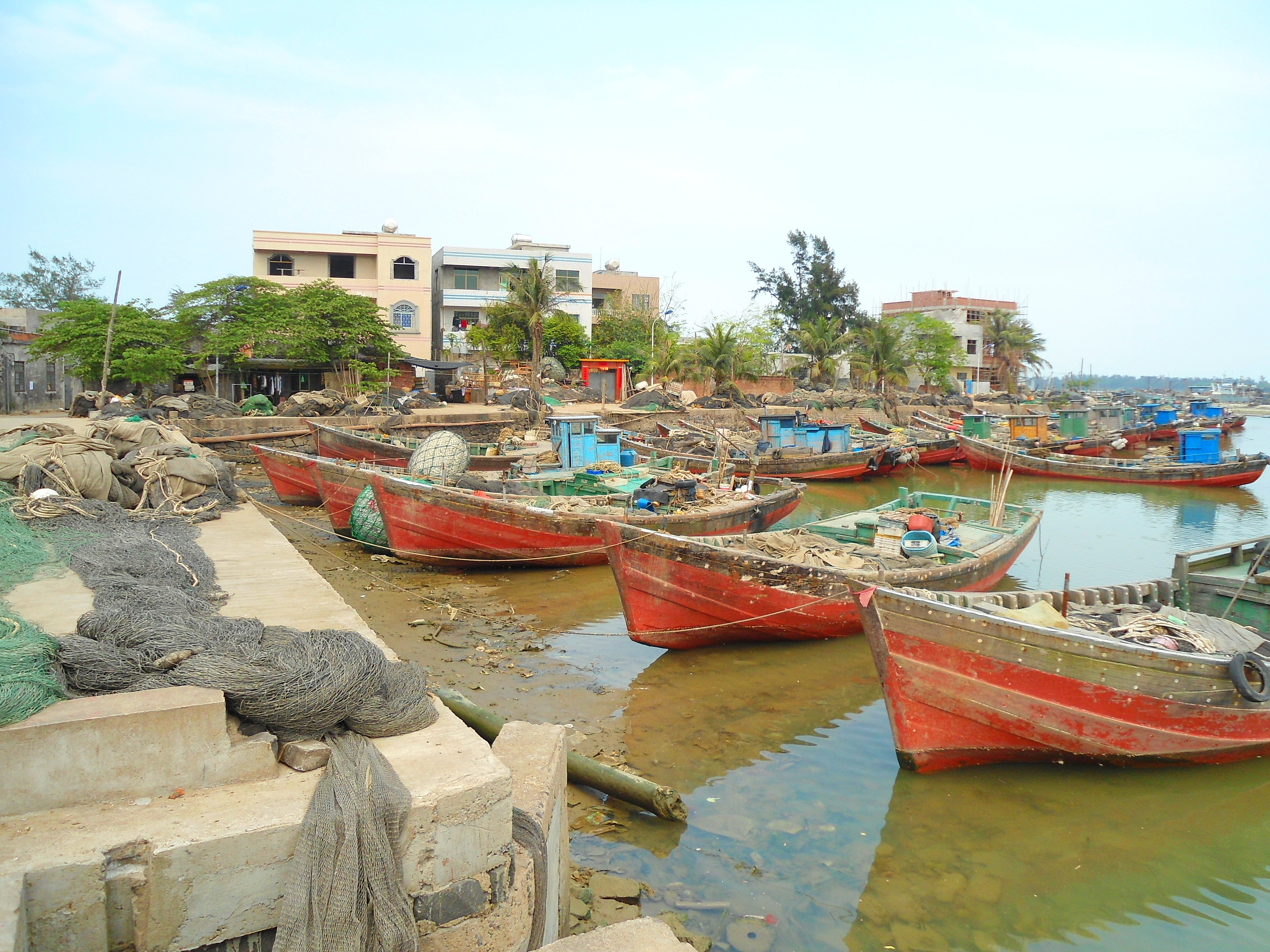
A small harbour on the east coast.

Plans to develop a new yacht port on the island are underway.

== Access ==
There are three bridges that connect the island to the rest of Hainan:

- The Xinbu Bridge links Haidian Island at the west Xinbu Island. It carries Haidian East 5th Road from Haidian Island into Xinbu Island, where it serves as a main east–west road, ending at the eastern edge of the island at Haikou New East Bridge.
- The Haikou New East Bridge crosses the Nandu River. It connects the eastern side of Xinbu Island at the end of Haidian East 5th Road to the rest of the province.
- A small bridge, the oldest and smallest of the three, connects the main part of Haikou City at its northeasternmost point with Xinbu Island close to its southern tip.

== Fish market ==
In 2016, the main fish market that serves Haikou moved from Haikou New Port to Xinbu Island. This large market is now located at the southeast corner of Haidian East 5th Road and a north-east road, roughly in the middle of the island. Fish are traded there roughly from 2am to 6am every night.
