= Longtang, Hainan =

Coordinates: 19.882773°N 110.411096°E

Longtang 龙塘镇
- Town
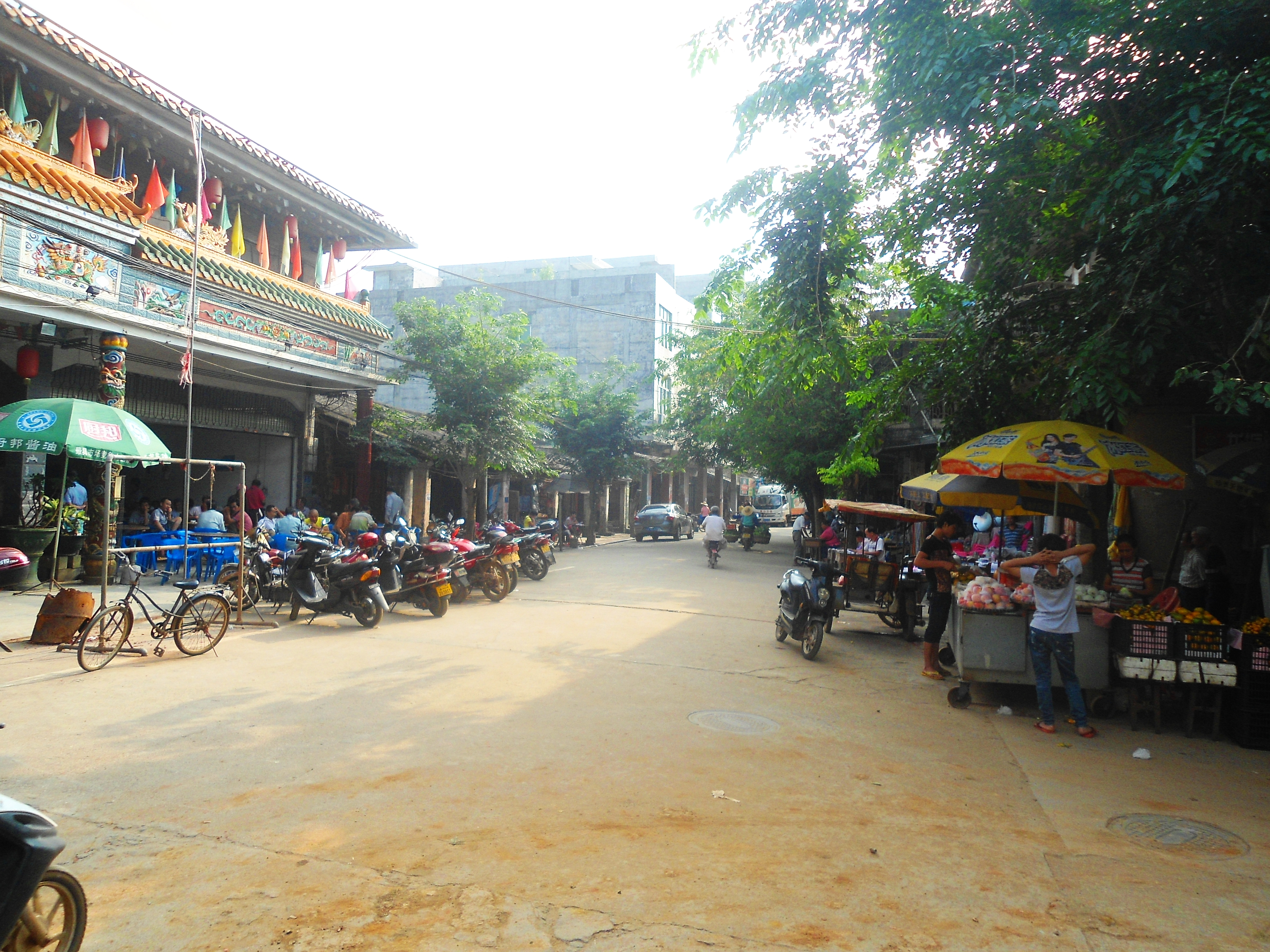
- Downtown Longtang
- Interactive map of Longtang
- Country: China
- Province: Hainan
- District: Qiongshan District
- Time zone: UTC+8 (China standard time)

Longtang (Chinese: 龙塘镇) is a town in Qiongshan District, Hainan, China. It is located on the west bank of the Nandu River approximately 15 km south of Haikou City, the capital of the province.

== See also ==
- Longtang Dam - a dam located at the north end of the town
