= Qiongzhou Bridge =

Qiongzhou Bridge 琼州大桥
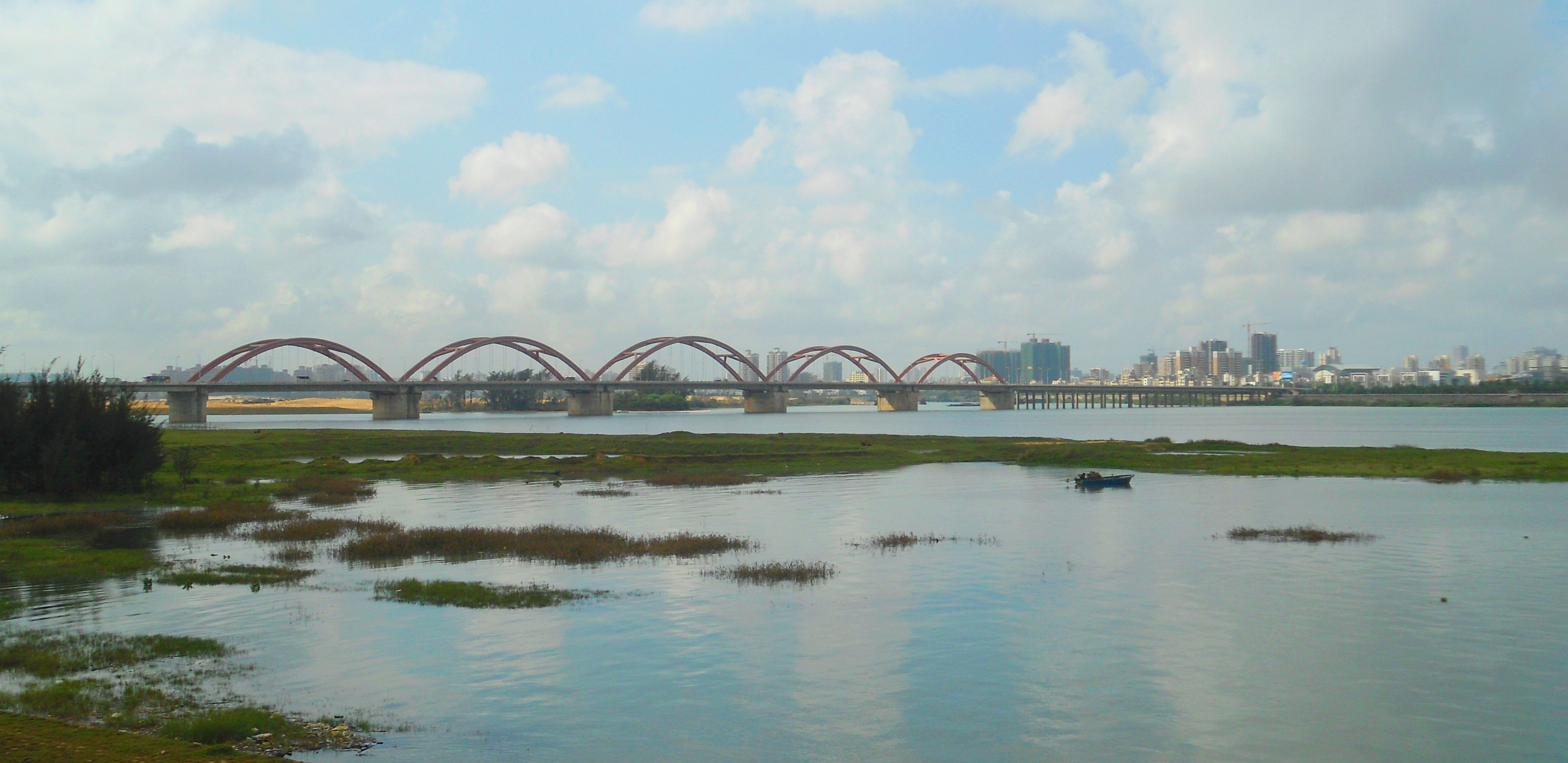
- Coordinates: 20.018605°N 110.384192°E
- Crosses: Nandu River
- Locale: Haikou, Hainan, China
- Other name(s): Nandu Bridge; Nandu Ninth Bridge

Characteristics
- Design: Tubular tied-arch
- Material: Steel
- Total length: 1,396.98 metres (4,583.3 ft)
- Width: 23 metres (75 ft)

History
- Designer: Provincial Highway Survey and Design Institute of the Highway Ministry of Science Institute
- Engineering design by: Seventh Engineering, China Railway Bridge Bureau Group Co., Ltd
- Construction cost: 200 million yuan (32.3 million USD)
- Opened: May 12, 2003

Location
- Interactive map of Qiongzhou Bridge

Qiongzhou Bridge (Chinese: 琼州大桥), also known as the Nandu Bridge and the Nandu Ninth Bridge, is a bridge that spans the Nandu River, Hainan Province, China. Opened on May 12, 2003, at a cost of 200 million yuan (US$32.3 million), it serves as the main bridge from Haikou city to Haikou Meilan International Airport. It crosses the Nandu River at the east end of Guoxing Avenue.

The bridge replaces the partially collapsed Nandu River Iron Bridge some 5 kilometers (3.1 mi) away.

== Description ==
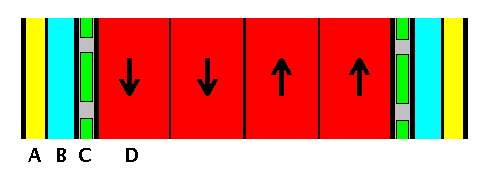
A: Pedestrian B: Two-wheel traffic C: Physical barrier and bridge structure D: Main traffic

This is a tied-arch bridge comprising five tubular steel arches mounted on six concrete foundations. The total width is 23 metres (75 ft) with a span of 1,396.98 metres (4,583.3 ft). It is a two-way bridge with each direction having two lanes for cars and trucks. The two directions of traffic are separated by a steel pipe mounted approximately 50 cm (20 in) above the deck. There is also a lane for two-wheel vehicles and, beside that, an outermost lane for pedestrian traffic, which is raised above the deck by about 50 cm (20 in). These two lanes are separated from the main traffic roads by a concrete barrier and the points where the arches enter the deck.
