= Chengmai County =

Chengmai 澄迈县
- County
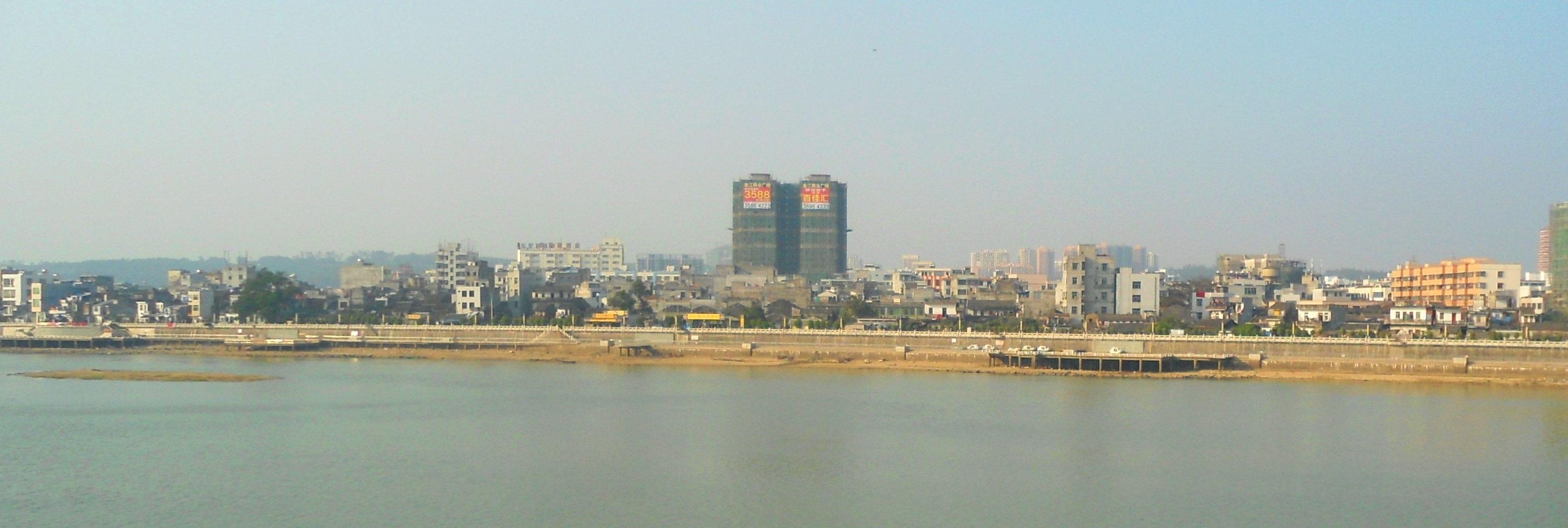

- Location in Hainan
- Coordinates: 19°45′7″N 110°0′57″E
- Country: China
- Province: Hainan

Area
  - Total: 2,067.6 km^{2} (798.3 sq mi)

Population (2012)
  - Total: 565,000
  - Density: 273/km^{2} (708/sq mi)
- Time zone: UTC+8 (China standard time)

Chengmai County (Chinese: 澄迈县; pinyin: Chéngmài Xiàn) is a county in Hainan, China. It is one of four counties of Hainan. Its postal code is 571900. In 2002, its population was 490,800.

== History ==
The first record of Chengmai County is in 110 BC, when it referred to as Guo County in one of Emperor Wu of Han's records. The county acquired its current name under the Sui dynasty reorganisation of 607. It was also recorded during the Ming dynasty.

== Geography ==
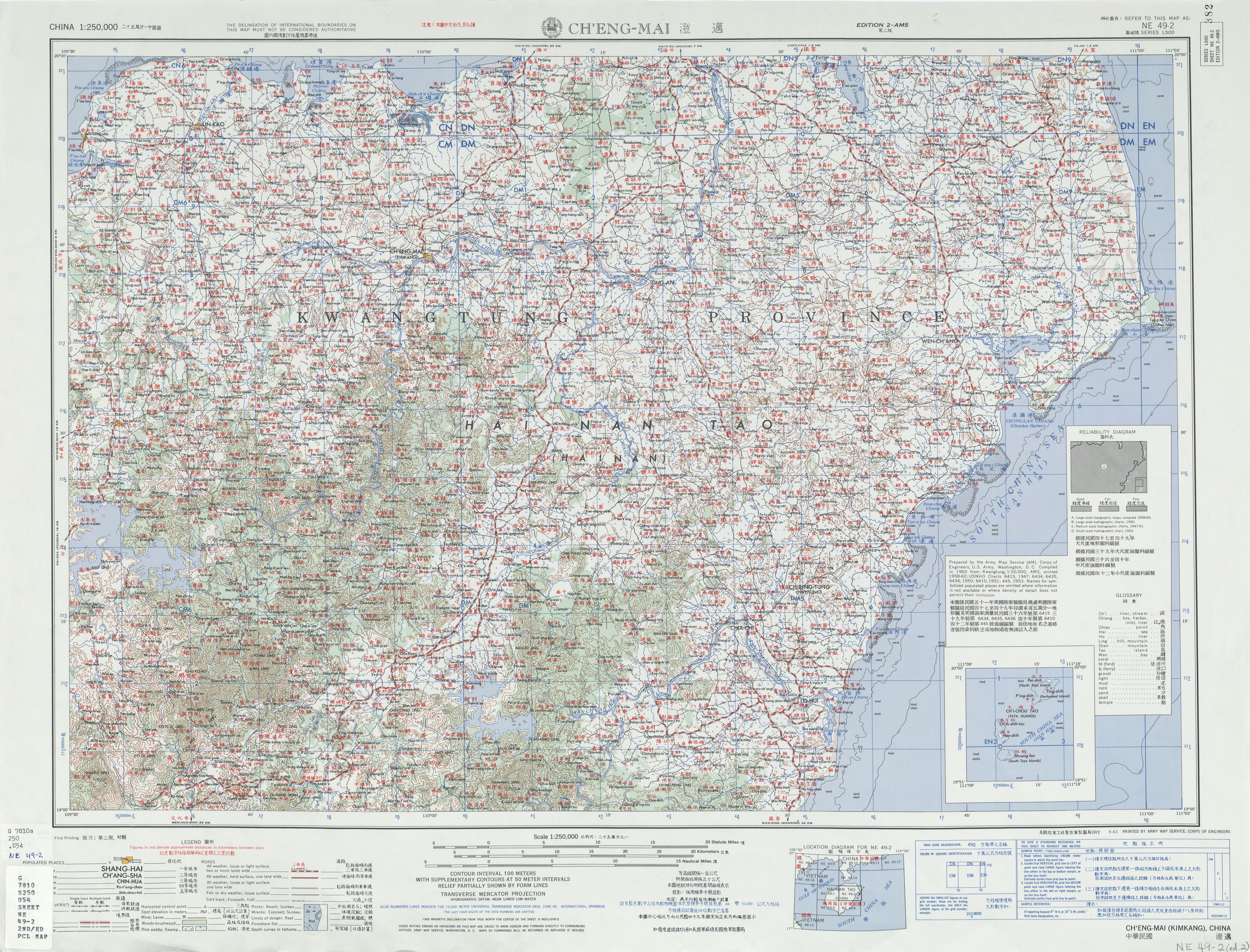
Chengmai (labelled as CH'ENG-MAI 澄邁) (1962)

Located in northwest Hainan, it is 56 km (35 mi) wide (east to west) and 70 km (43 mi) long (north to south). It has a total land area of 2,067.6 km^{2} (798.3 sq mi). Climate-wise, it is tropical with ample sunshine and moderate rainfall all year round; on average, the county receives 2060.5 hours of sunshine and 1,756 mm (69.1 in) of rain each year. The average annual temperature is 23.7 °C (74.7 °F).

With a total land area of 206.7 km^{2} (79.8 sq mi), melons and other tropical crops are grown around the county.

More than 20 rivers flow through the county, providing 17.4×10^{9} m^{3} (610×10^{9} cu ft) of water per year.

=== Jinjiang Town ===
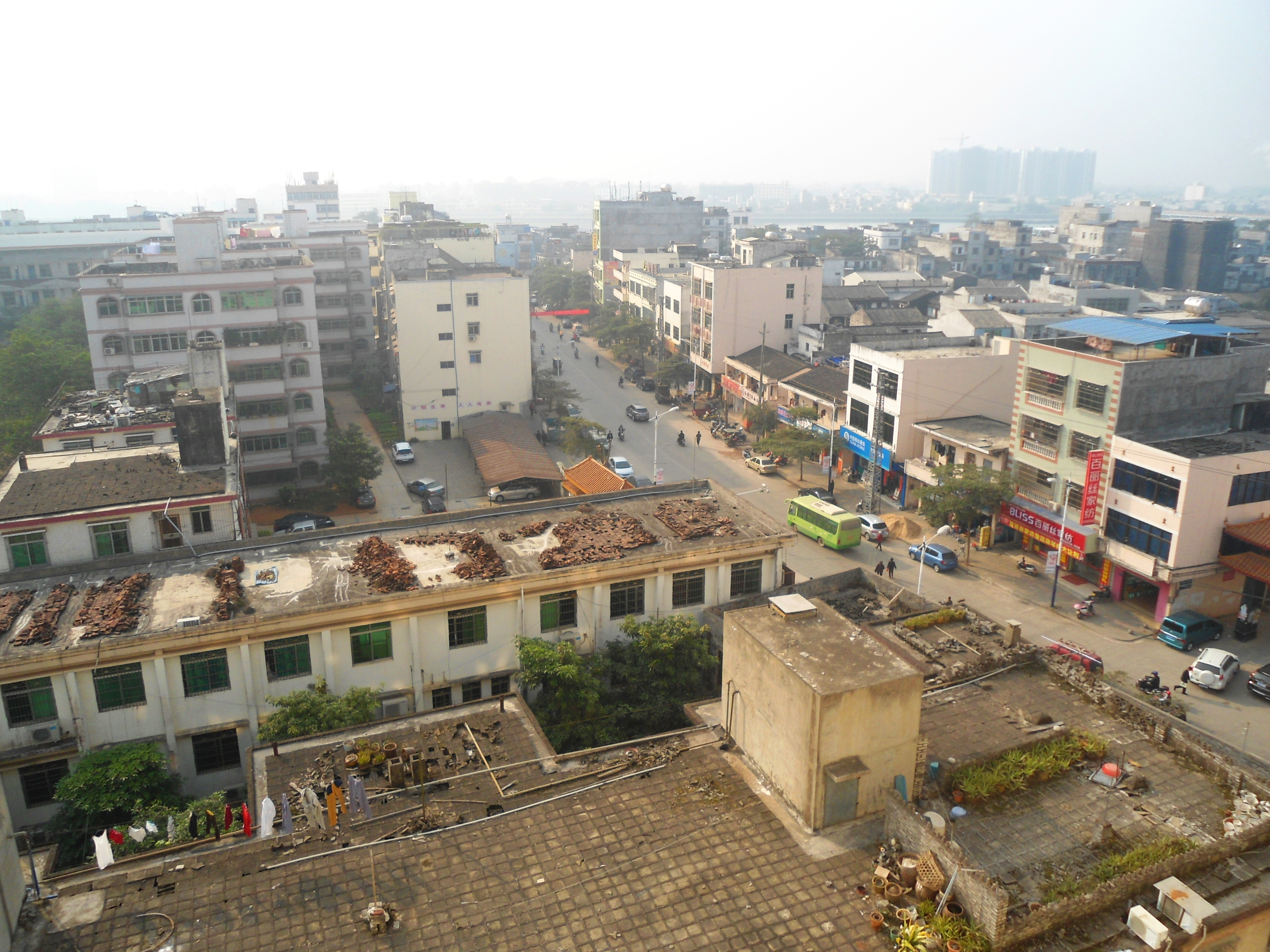
Jinjiang viewed from the south side of the Nandu River

The main settlement in the county is Jinjiang. It is located directly on the north side of the Nandu River and essentially occupies the south face of a large hill. The old section is located by the river with newer buildings further up. The backside of the hill is currently under development with mostly high-rise apartments being built. Many government buildings are situated on the top of the hill. Near the centre of the hill, there is a large park.

== Climate ==
Chengmai a tropical wet and dry climate (Köppen Aw), bordering a tropical monsoon climate (Köppen Am).

Climate data for Chengmai, elevation 31 m (102 ft), (1991–2020 normals, extremes 1967–present)
Month	Jan	Feb	Mar	Apr	May	Jun	Jul	Aug	Sep	Oct	Nov	Dec	Year
Record high °C (°F)	34.0 (93.2)	37.9 (100.2)	40.4 (104.7)	42.0 (107.6)	41.1 (106.0)	41.1 (106.0)	38.6 (101.5)	38.2 (100.8)	37.1 (98.8)	36.7 (98.1)	35.9 (96.6)	32.0 (89.6)	42.0 (107.6)
Mean daily maximum °C (°F)	22.8 (73.0)	24.8 (76.6)	28.5 (83.3)	31.7 (89.1)	33.6 (92.5)	34.4 (93.9)	34.2 (93.6)	33.3 (91.9)	31.8 (89.2)	29.8 (85.6)	27.2 (81.0)	23.5 (74.3)	29.6 (85.3)
Daily mean °C (°F)	18.0 (64.4)	19.5 (67.1)	22.6 (72.7)	25.8 (78.4)	27.7 (81.9)	28.6 (83.5)	28.5 (83.3)	27.9 (82.2)	26.8 (80.2)	24.8 (76.6)	22.3 (72.1)	19.0 (66.2)	24.3 (75.7)
Mean daily minimum °C (°F)	14.9 (58.8)	16.2 (61.2)	19.0 (66.2)	21.9 (71.4)	23.9 (75.0)	24.8 (76.6)	24.8 (76.6)	24.7 (76.5)	23.9 (75.0)	21.7 (71.1)	19.2 (66.6)	15.9 (60.6)	20.9 (69.6)
Record low °C (°F)	1.1 (34.0)	5.6 (42.1)	6.0 (42.8)	14.1 (57.4)	16.2 (61.2)	19.7 (67.5)	21.5 (70.7)	21.3 (70.3)	18.2 (64.8)	12.7 (54.9)	8.3 (46.9)	2.0 (35.6)	1.1 (34.0)
Average precipitation mm (inches)	21.2 (0.83)	26.4 (1.04)	41.1 (1.62)	98.4 (3.87)	237.8 (9.36)	235.0 (9.25)	270.2 (10.64)	353.1 (13.90)	290.7 (11.44)	227.6 (8.96)	51.7 (2.04)	38.1 (1.50)	1,891.3 (74.45)
Average precipitation days (≥ 0.1 mm)	9.4	8.6	9.3	11.8	17.7	17.3	17.4	19.0	16.6	11.4	8.6	8.7	155.8
Average relative humidity (%)	86	85	83	82	82	82	82	85	87	86	85	85	84
Mean monthly sunshine hours	91.4	95.1	128.2	153.1	187.4	193.1	206.1	182.9	146.2	140.0	110.8	85.8	1,720.1
Percentage possible sunshine	27	29	34	40	46	49	51	46	40	39	33	25	38
Source: China Meteorological Administration all-time extreme temperatureall-time March, April, May and June (Provincial Record High for June) highsall-time September record highall-time October record

== Economy ==
The main industry is mining, with more than ten resources available within the county including quartz, stone, limestone, crystals, gold, silver, peat, zinc, aluminium, iron ore, kaolin, and manganese. Over 5 billion tonnes of quartz are still unmined in the county, with an average grade of 99.5% silicon. There are also nearly 11 million tonnes of limestone remaining in addition to crystal deposits 5.5 km (3.4 mi) long and 3 km (1.9 mi) wide and around 80,000,000 tonnes of kaolin.

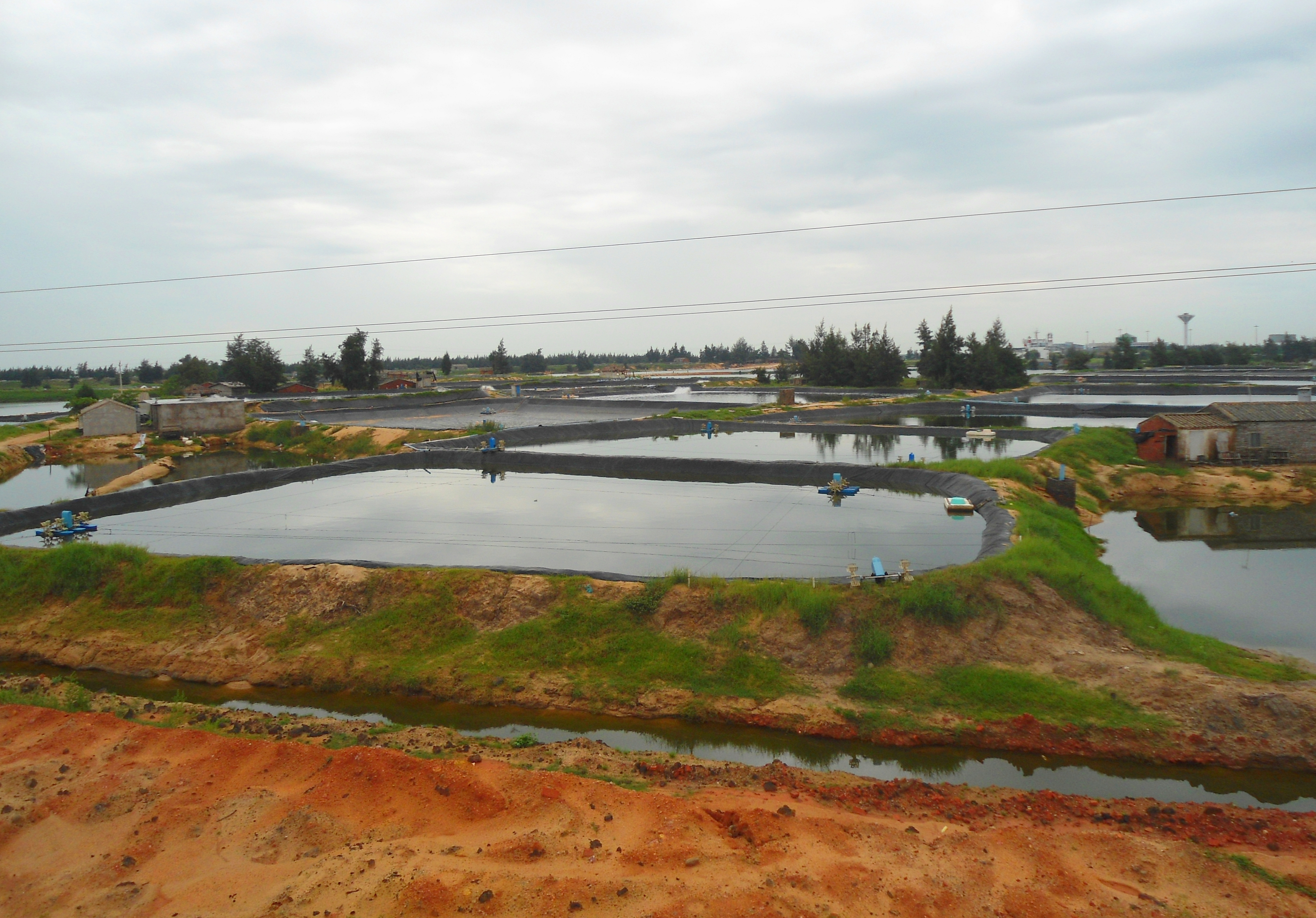
Fish farms in Chengmai

Fishing also makes up a large part, with the county possessing 89.8 km (55.8 mi) of coastline. Apart from farm fishing, marine catches include mackerel, redfish, croaker fish, grouper, pomfret, tuna, squid, cuttlefish, lobster and shrimp, are fished in the harbour at Tu Beach. The diverse and populous fish are a result of a nutrient-rich sediment at the bottom of the harbour.

== Demographics ==
The Han people account for 99.5% of the population of the county.

=== Longevity ===
The people of Chengmai County live to an average of 77.79 years. Among the population are 215 centenarians. The proportion of centenarians compared to the rest of the county's population, and the overall number, ranks highest of all cities and counties in China.

Of the total 565,000 people living in the county, 18,500 are more than 80 years old, 896 of which are couples.

== See also ==
- List of administrative divisions of Hainan
