= Longtang Dam =

Coordinates: 19.885723°N 110.420625°E

- The new Longtang Dam (viewed from the west bank) was built about 70 metres downstream from the original
- Interactive map of Longtang Dam
- Official name: 龙塘大坝
- Location: Longtang, Hainan, China
- Status: Operational
- Construction began: 2001
- Opening date: 2011

Dam and spillways
- Type of dam: Gravity
- Impounds: Nandu River

The Longtang Dam (龙塘大坝), also known as Longtang Reservoir and Nandu River Dam, is located on the Nandu River at Longtang, Hainan, China.

Built around 2001, the dam remained in operation, generating electricity on both banks until around 2022 to 2026. It was then replaced with a modern dam about 70 metres downstream. This new dam has a roadway and numerous sluice gates that are controlled with a movable gantry system.

This station is a Haikou Water project, and is under the supervision of the Haikou Nandu River Water Diversion Project.

== History ==
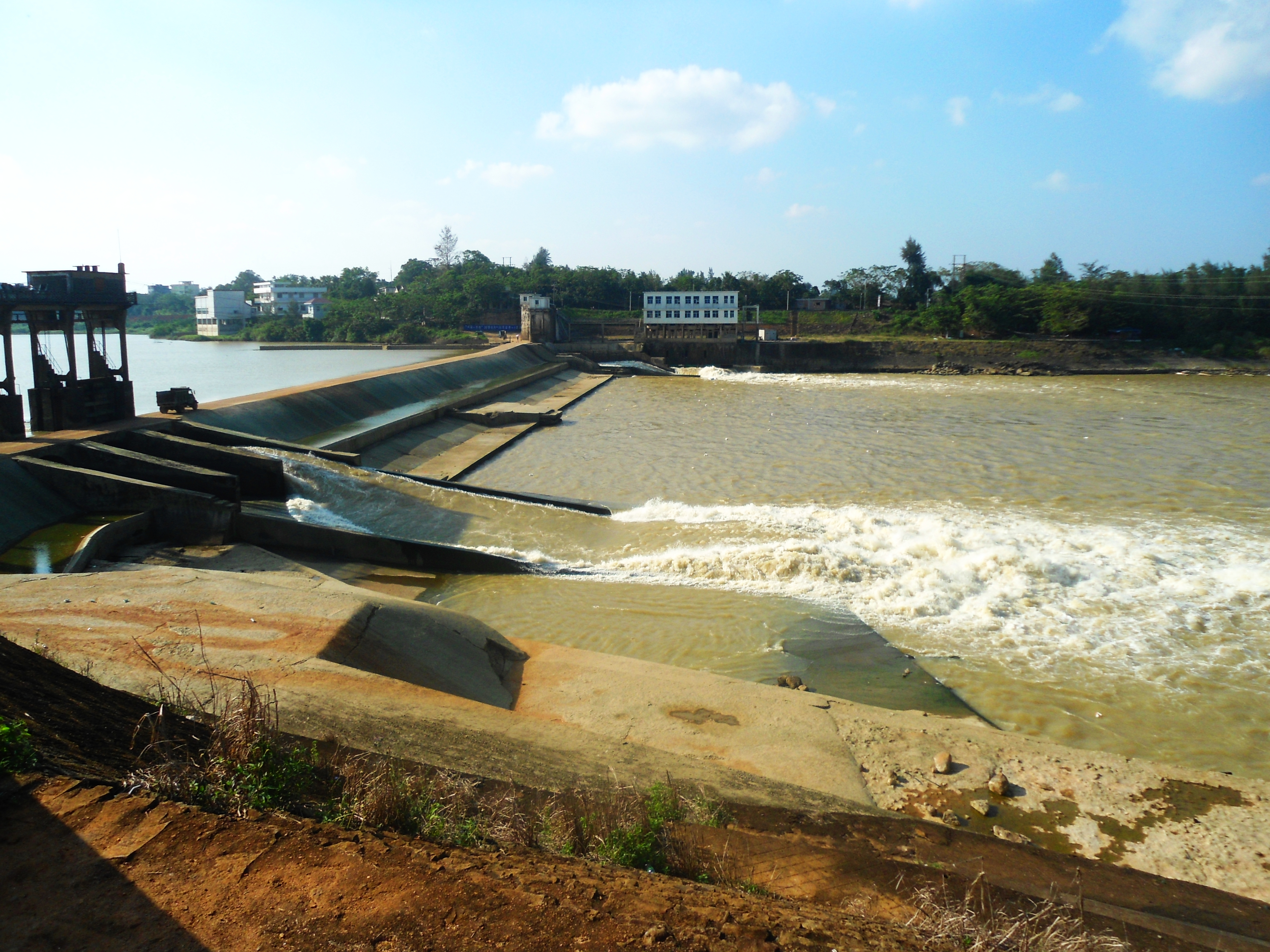
Original dam viewed from the east bank

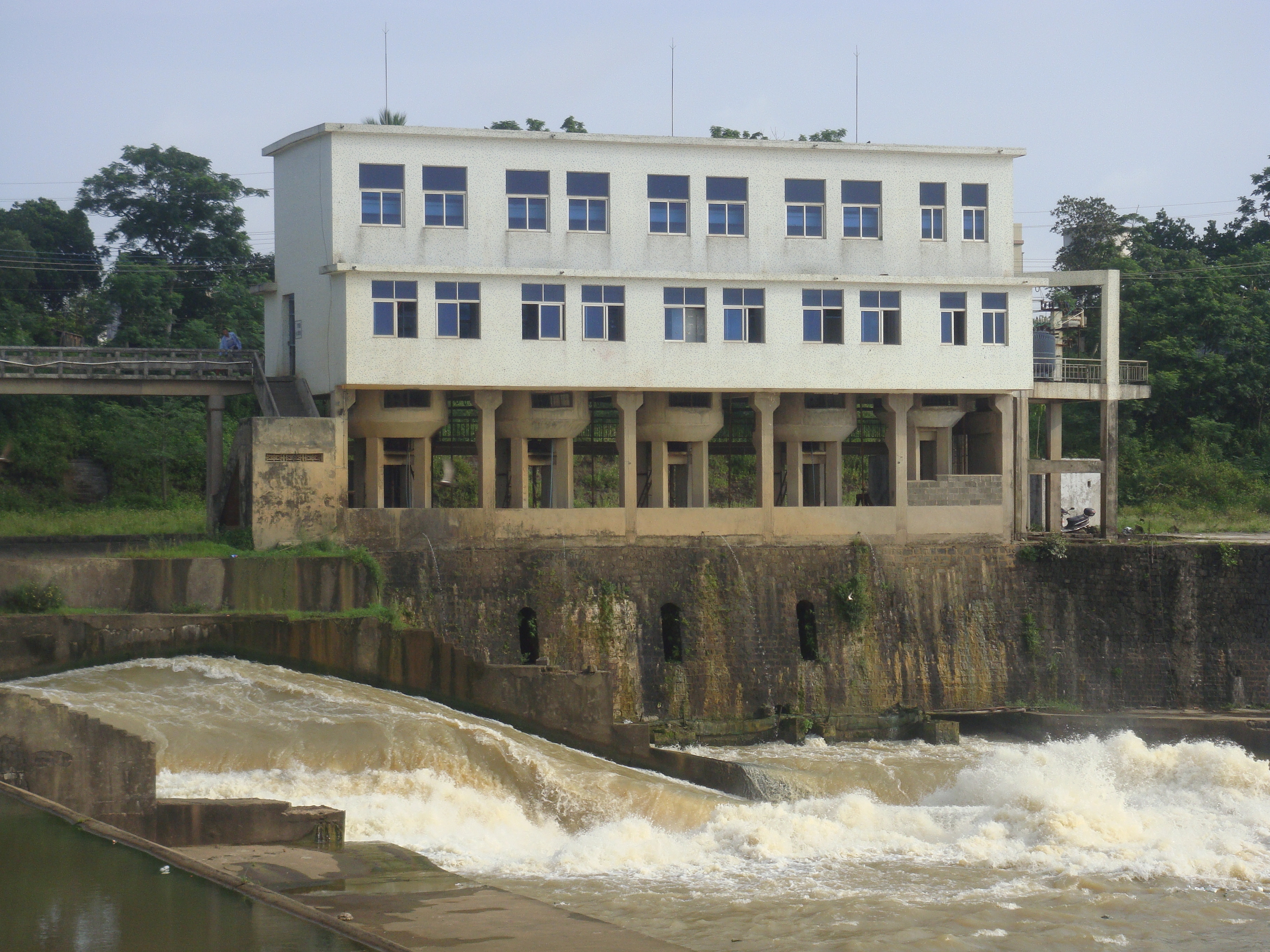
Original West Hydro Station serving the old dam

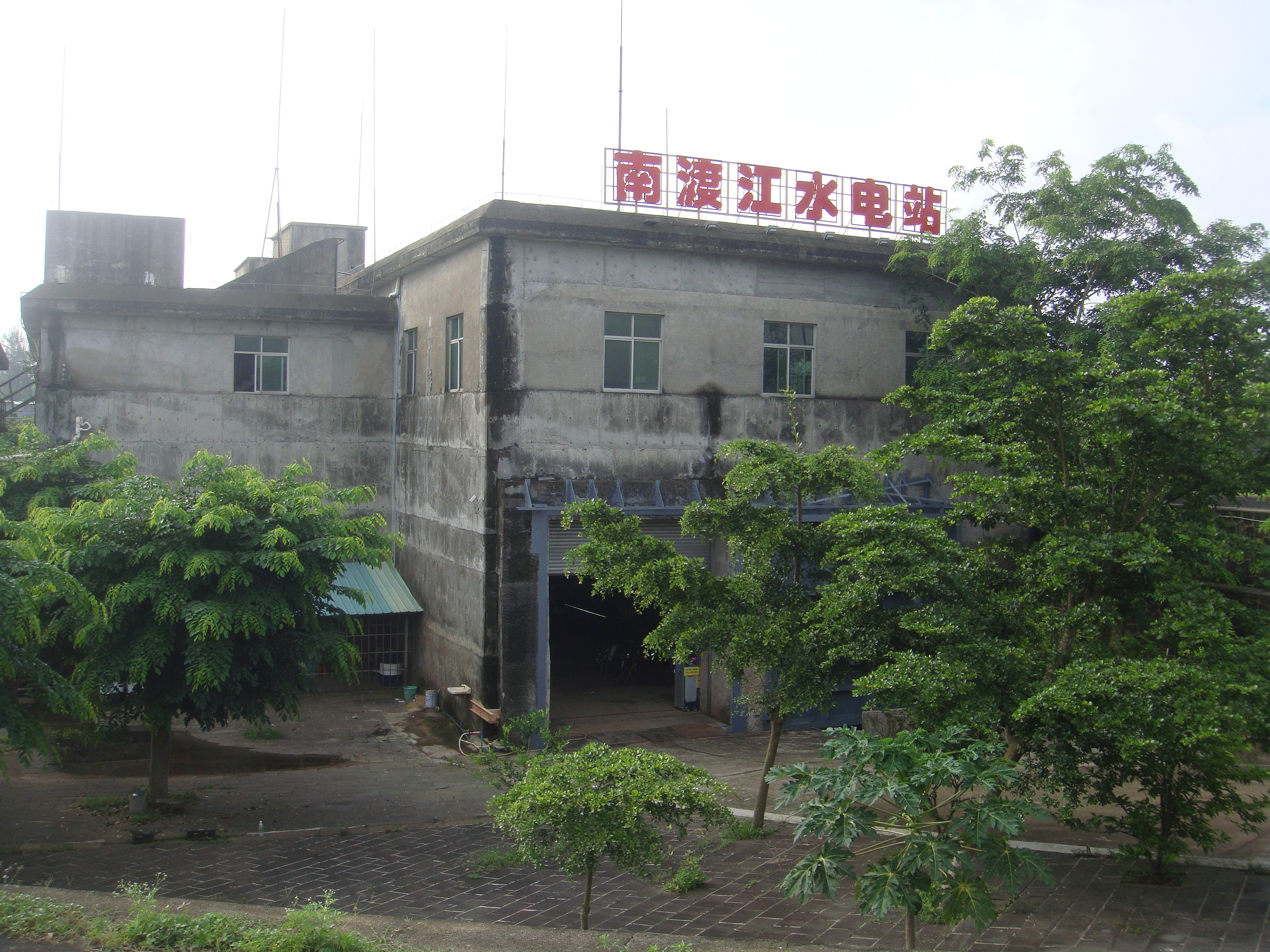
Original East Hydro Station

Planning for the original East Hydro Station started in 1998. Work began in 2001, and in November 2011, it began operating.

The original dam was near water level, so vehicles and pedestrians were able to cross only when the water level was low enough. It had a normal water level of 7.7 metres. At 11.5 metres, an alert was issued. When the dam was closed, large metal doors were lowered at each end to prevent access. It also had hydro electric stations on both banks.

The station received water from a head race that ran along the east side of the river for approximately 200 metres. Water entered the turbine, which was the Chongqing-made GZ SK115-WP-275. The SFG2500-40/2860 generator could receive a 5.5-metre intake of head water at a rate of 54.8 cubic metres per second. It was attached to speed monitor model PWST-100-4. This system was mostly automated and could be managed and monitored from the central control office located on the western bank of the Nandu. The generator's output capacity was 5,000 kW (2 x 2,400 kW / 6.3 kV).

The west station's old head race was essentially a concrete wall within the river that diverted some water to the station. The station had five small generators.

Video showing high water levels, viewed from the west bank on August 20, 2016

At 12:00, August 19, 2016, after Tropical Storm Dianmu brought heavy rains, the water level at the dam reached 13.35 metres, a ten-year high. This prompted a yellow alert indicating that water levels for the Nandu River downstream of the dam would be around two metres higher than normal.

Between around 2022 to 2026, the original dam was replaced with a modern dam about 70 metres downstream. This new dam, built with a cofferdam system, has a roadway and numerous sluice gates that are controlled with a movable gantry system. It now enhances the security of Haikou city's water supply, can reduce flooding and drainage pressure in the upstream portion of the Nandu River.

This new dam is one of the 150 key water conservancy projects enacted between 2020 and 2022.
