= Nandu River Iron Bridge =

Bridge in China

Nandu River Iron Bridge 海口南渡江铁桥
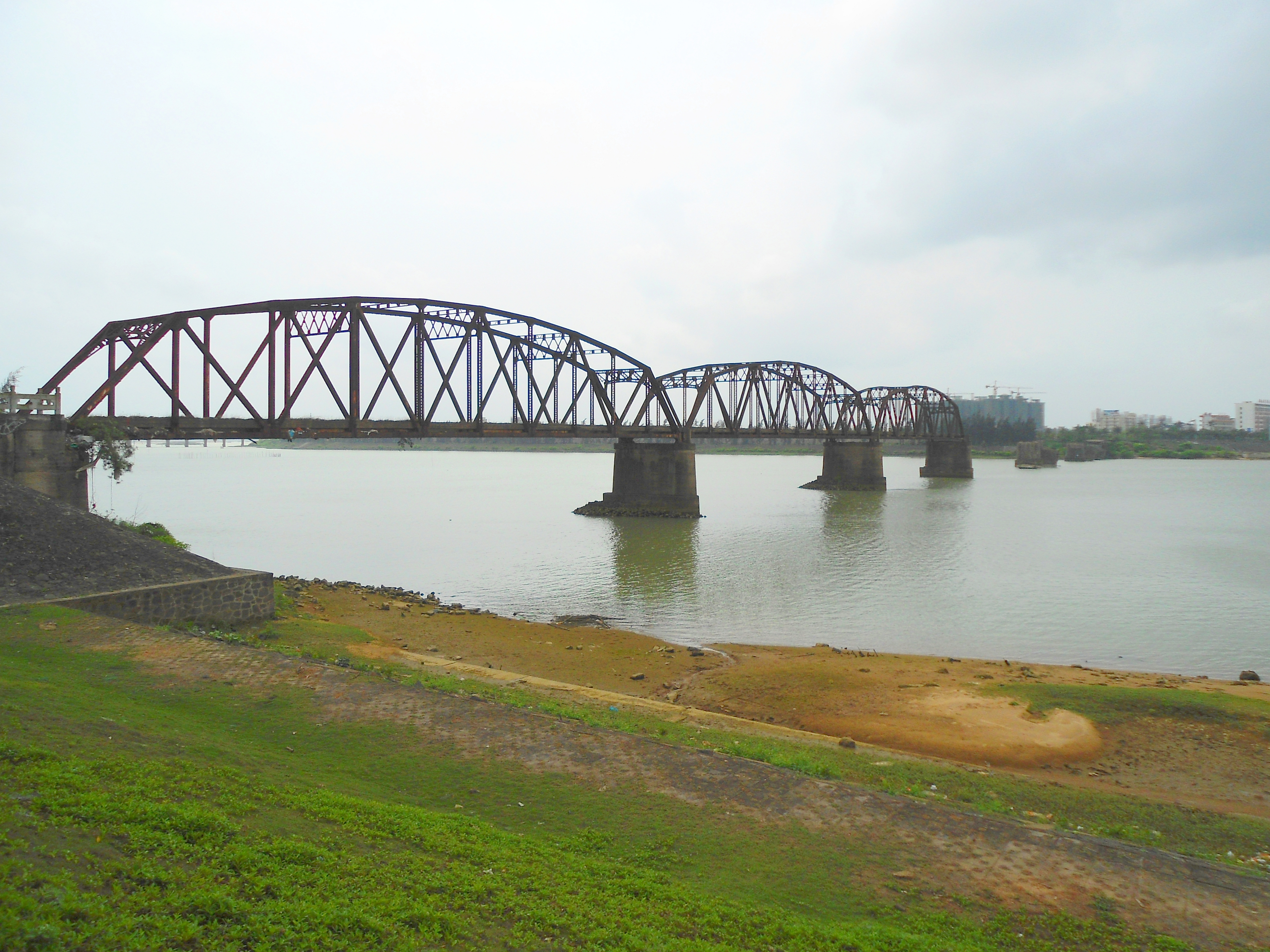
- A view from the eastern shore of the Nandu River, just north of the bridge
- Coordinates: 19.981372°N 110.405486°E
- Crossed: Nandu River
- Locale: Haikou, Hainan, China
- Other name: Lu Palace Bridge (original Japanese name)

Characteristics
- Design: Truss
- Material: Steel
- Total length: 785.34 metres
- Width: 6.8 metres
- Load limit: 20 tons
- Design life: 20 years

History
- Fabrication by: Kaohsiung Shipbuilding Production and Installation
- Construction start: March 26, 1940 (approval to begin design and construction)
- Opened: 1942
- Collapsed: 2000
- Closed: 1982

Location
- Interactive map of Nandu River Iron Bridge

The Nandu River Iron Bridge (Chinese: 海口南渡江铁桥), also known as the Devil's Iron Bridge, Old Iron Bridge, and originally the Lu Palace Bridge (吕宫桥), is a partially collapsed, steel truss bridge over the Nandu River, in the north of Hainan Province, China. Opened to traffic in 1942, it was Hainan's first bridge over the Nandu River.

== History ==
The bridge was built by the Imperial Japanese Army during the Second Sino-Japanese War to provide access to the land west of the river. On March 26, 1940, approval was given to begin design and construction. The responsibility for the bridge's construction was given to the Japanese company Shimizu Group Contracting, with the steel frames built by Taiwan's Takao Shipbuilding Production and Installation.

The bridge is 785.34 metres (2,576.6 ft) long, 6.8 metres (22 ft) wide, and has a concrete deck. A cylindrical, concrete guard house remains at the eastern end with horizontal openings. The bridge was designed for a maximum useful lifespan of 20 years, and could carry 20 tons. After Japan's defeat in World War II, the bridge entered civilian service with a 10-ton load limit and one-way traffic only.

In 1984, the Qiongzhou Bridge was constructed approximately 5 kilometres (3.1 mi) to the north (downstream). As the Nandu River Iron Bridge deteriorated and became dangerous, it was closed to traffic and preserved as a monument.

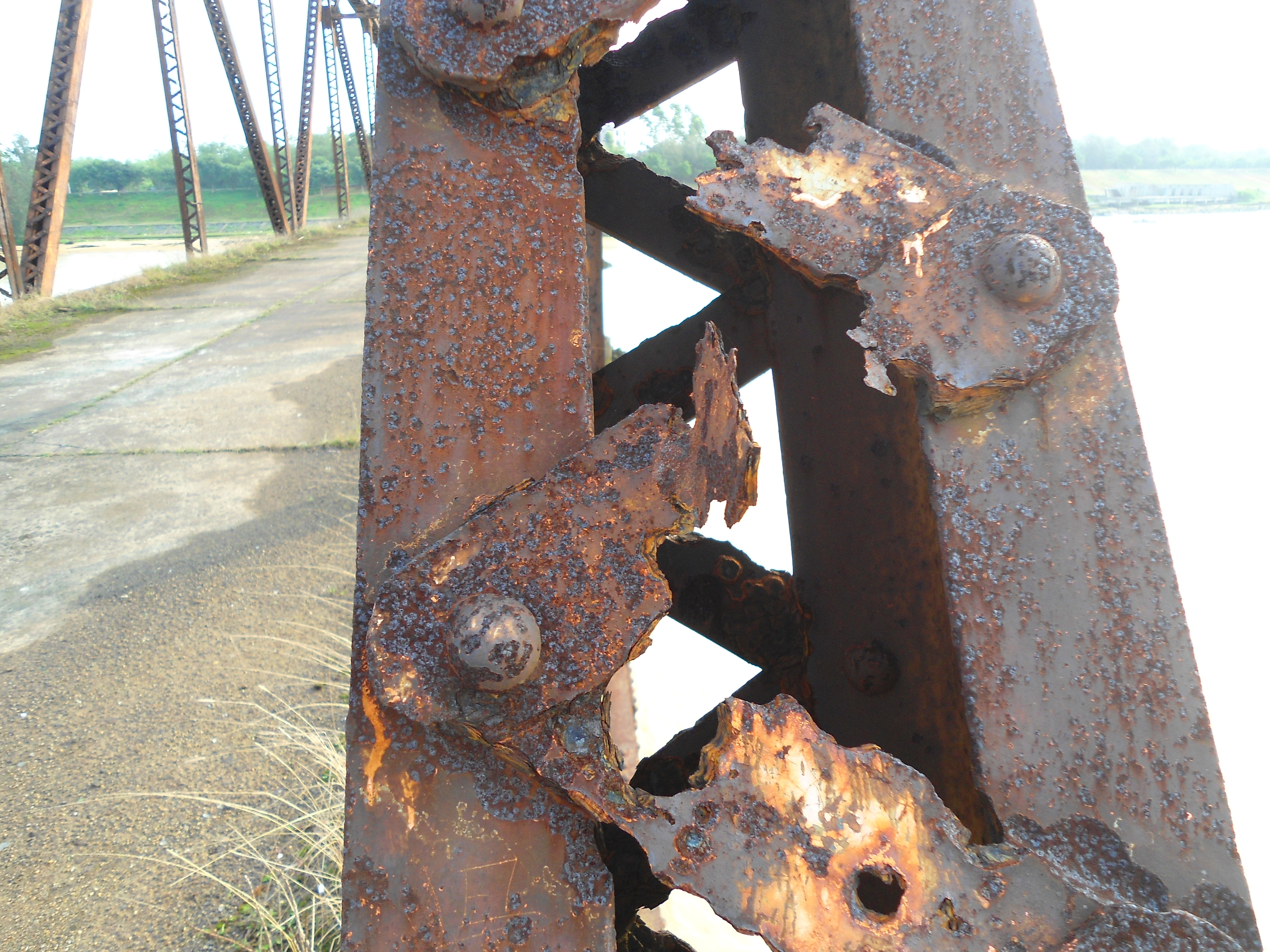
Evident deterioraton

== Safety concerns ==
In October 2000, flooding caused the collapse of the western part of the bridge, leaving three trusses. These trusses are corroded, with many of the struts heavily pitted or completely rusted through. Concerns over the potential for collapse of the remains have prompted discussions over whether it should be dismantled. Local residents and others wish to preserve it as a historical monument.

Today, the bridge attracts such visitors as photographers, tourists, couples using the site as a backdrop for wedding photo shoots, and on September 18 each year, people gather to pay tribute.

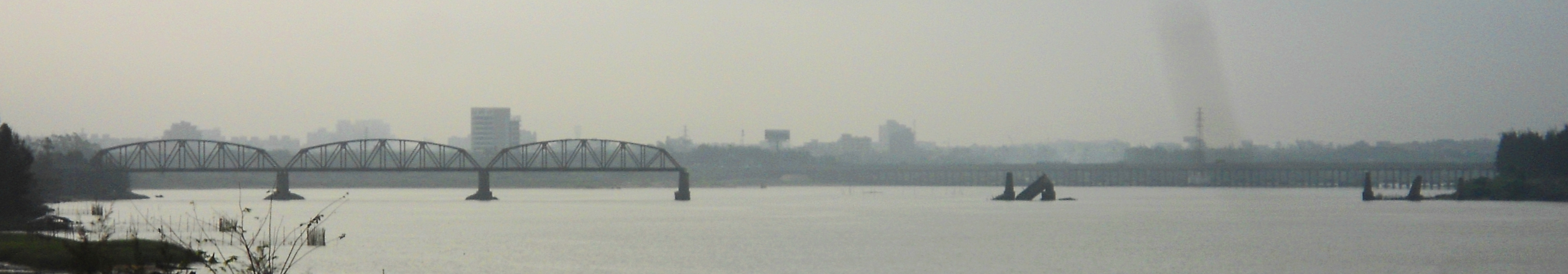
The remaining sections viewed from the eastern shore approximately 1.5 km to the north (downstream).
