= Nandu River =

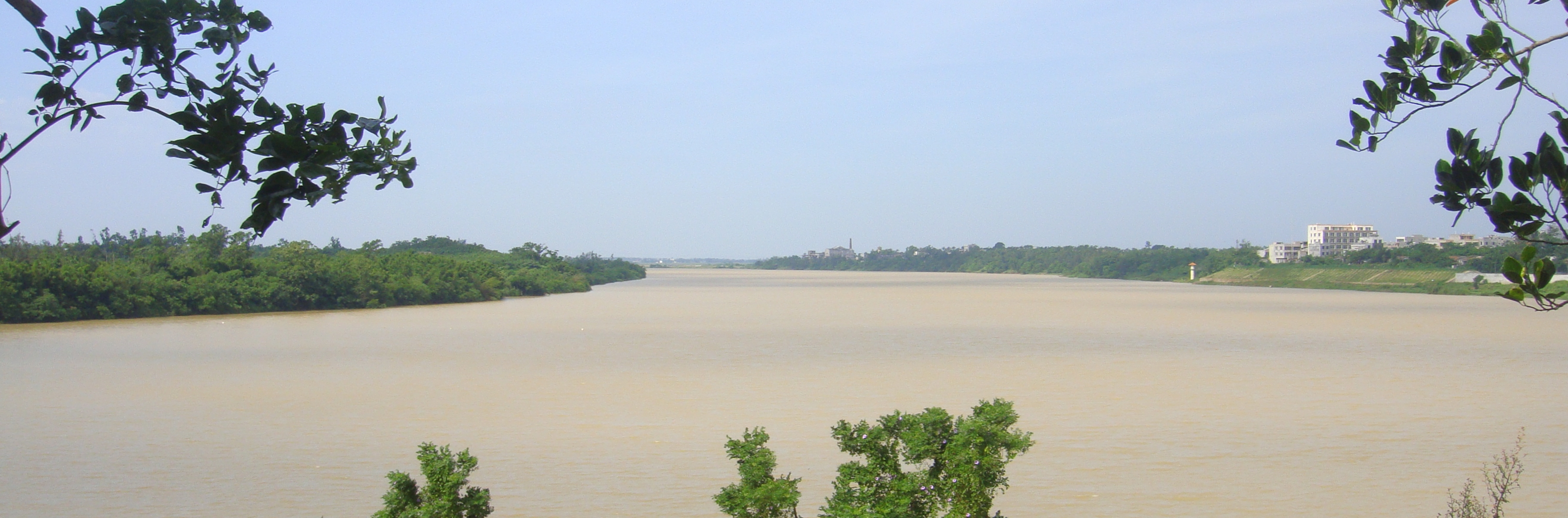
- Nandu River at Longtang just north of the town and south of the Longtang Dam, on the west side, facing southeast
- Native name: 南渡江 (Chinese)

Location
- Country: People's Republic of China
- Province: Hainan

Physical characteristics
- Mouth
  - location: Qiongzhou Strait
- Length: 314 km (195 mi)
- Discharge
  - average: 6.099×10^{9} m^{3}/a (193.3 m^{3}/s; 6,825 cu ft/s)

The Nandu River (Chinese: 南渡江) is the longest river in Hainan Province, China. Its tributary is the Xinwu River. The river discharges into the Nandu River estuary at Haikou city, and then into Qiongzhou Strait.

The river is 314 km long, with a discharge of 6.099 billion cubic metres. It passes the major settlements of Chengmai Zhen in Chengmai County then Dingcheng in Ding'an County. The river then turns north, goes over the Longtang Dam at Longtang, a somewhat smaller town than Chengmai and Ding'an. The Nandu then goes under several bridges, such as the Nandu River Iron Bridge and Qiongzhou Bridge. Once passed the Qiongzhou Bridge, at the southern tip of Xinbu Island, the Nandu flows north along the east side of Xinbu Island and out into the sea. At the southern tip of Xinbu Island, two distributaries branch off. One is the Henggouhe Channel which runs along the west side of Xinbu Island. The other is the smaller Haidian River which flows westward, under the Haikou Century Bridge, and out into Haikou Bay.

== Landmarks and crossings ==
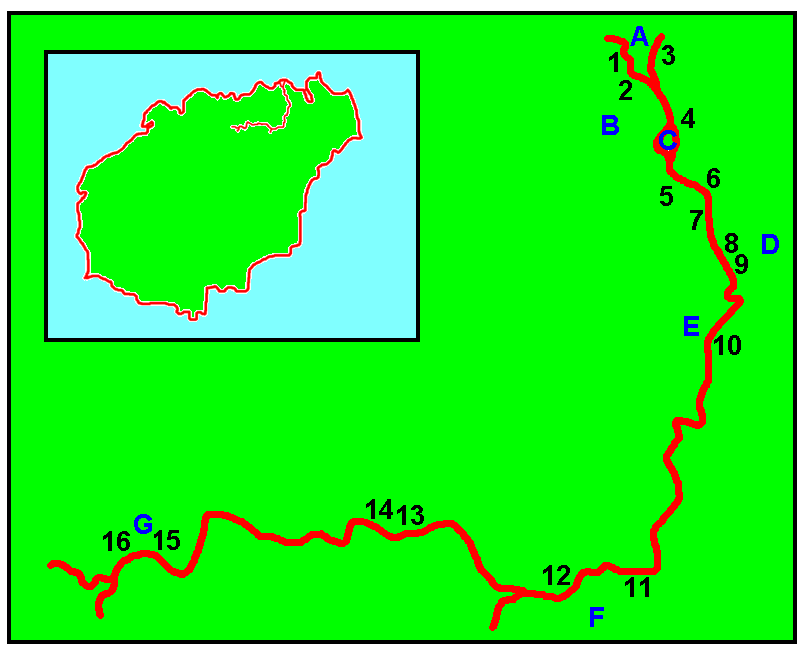

From Chengmai Zhen in Chengmai County at the west to its mouth at Haikou there are numerous bridges crossing the Nandu River. Some are semi-permanent and get washed out during times of high water, while other, major bridges are currently under construction. The following is a fairly comprehensive list of landmarks and bridges between Chengmai Zhen and Haikou City.

Landmarks
- A. Xinbu Island
- B. Haikou
- B. Simapo Island
- C. Lingshan
- D. Haikou Meilan International Airport
- E. Longtang
- F. Dingcheng, the main city in Ding'an County
- G. Chengmai Zhen, the main city in Chengmai County

Crossings
1. Xinbu Bridge, connecting Haidian Island to Xinbu Island
2. A small, old arch bridge connecting the main part of Haikou to Xinbu Island
3. Haikou New East Bridge, connects Xinbu Island at its eastern shore to the rest of Hainan
4. Wenming East Road Tunnel, crosses under the Nandu just north of the Qiongzhou Bridge
5. Qiongzhou Bridge, the main bridge from Haikou to Haikou Meilan International Airport
6. Hai Rui Bridge, an extension of Yehai Road, named after Hai Rui
7. Nandu River Iron Bridge, a partially collapsed, steel truss bridge built by the Imperial Japanese Army in World War II
8. Nandu River Bridge, built in 1984, carries Xindazhou Avenue to Lingshan
9. A railway bridge for Hainan Eastern Ring High-Speed Railway trains
10. A bridge just west of, and leading to, Haikou Meilan International Airport
11. Longtang Dam, during low water serves as a vehicle and pedestrian crossing to the town of Longtang on the western bank
12. Part of China National Highway 224
13. Dinghai Bridge, an under-construction bridge. Adjacent is a temporary bridge. Also, around a kilometre to the east there are two other semi-permanent, wooden toll bridges for light traffic.
14. A bridge from Yongfa town on the north bank to locations south of the Nandu
15. Part of the newly built Highway S21
16. One of two bridges from Chengmai Zhen in Chengmai County on the north bank that provides access to the south side of the Nandu
17. The second of two bridges from Chengmai Zhen in Chengmai County on the north bank that provides access to the south side of the Nandu

== Flooding ==
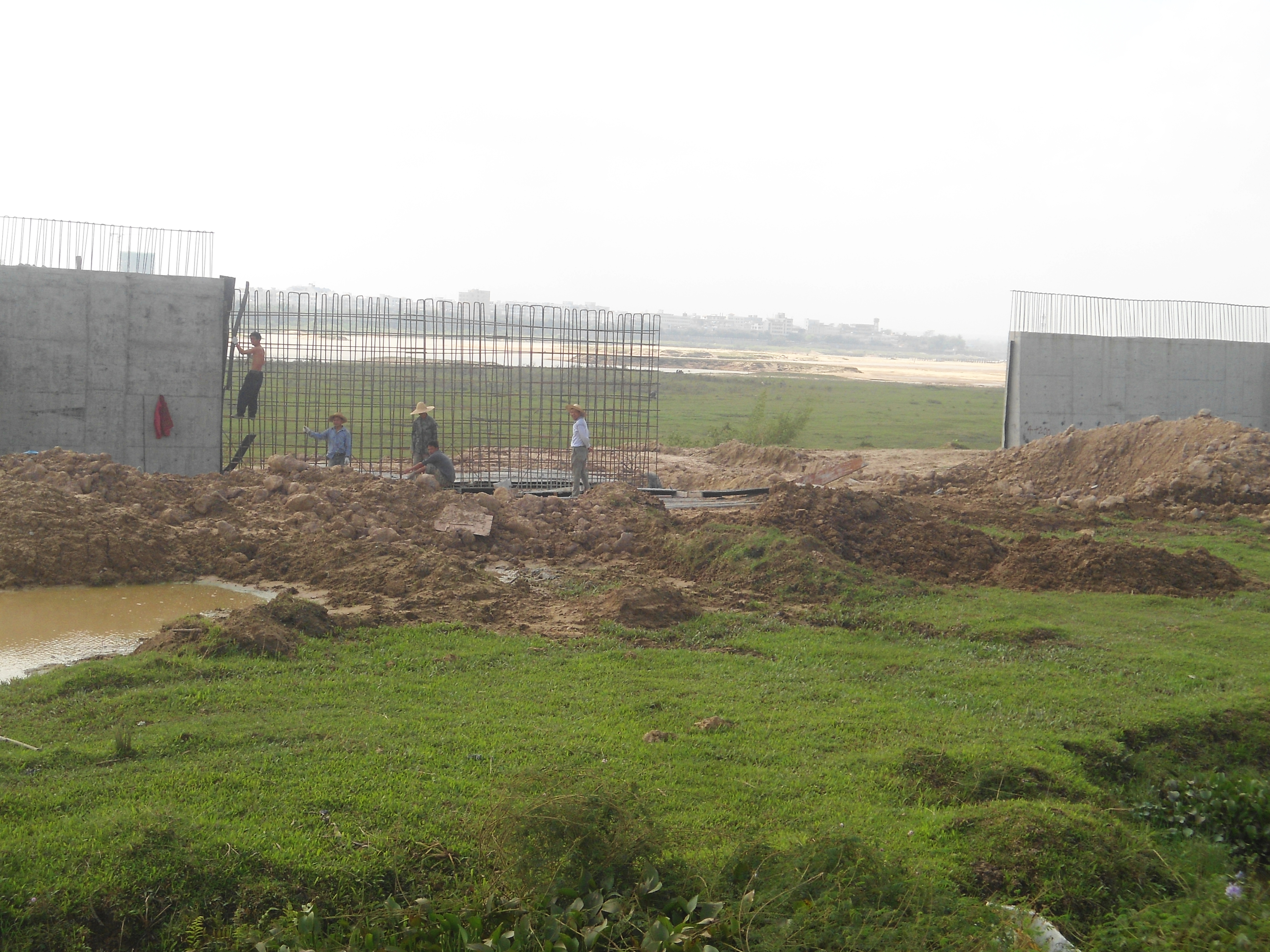
flood wall being installed on the west side of the Nandu near Dingcheng

The Nandu occasionally floods its banks. For that reason, preventative measures have been taken. For example, near Haikou and in other parts, levees were built, and flood walls were constructed on the west bank near Dingcheng.

One instance of flooding occurred at a sharp bend in the river at Bushicun village. There in August 2016, on the outside bend, as it had before, water surged and flooded onto the land. The ground there, several metres above normal river level, is strewn with rusted boat hulls from previous floods.19.8207°N 110.3957°W

== Reservoirs and lakes ==
There's a total of 150×10^{6} m^{3} (5.3×10^{9} cu ft) in the Fengtan Reservoir, Forge Reservoir, and East Lake.

== Gallery ==
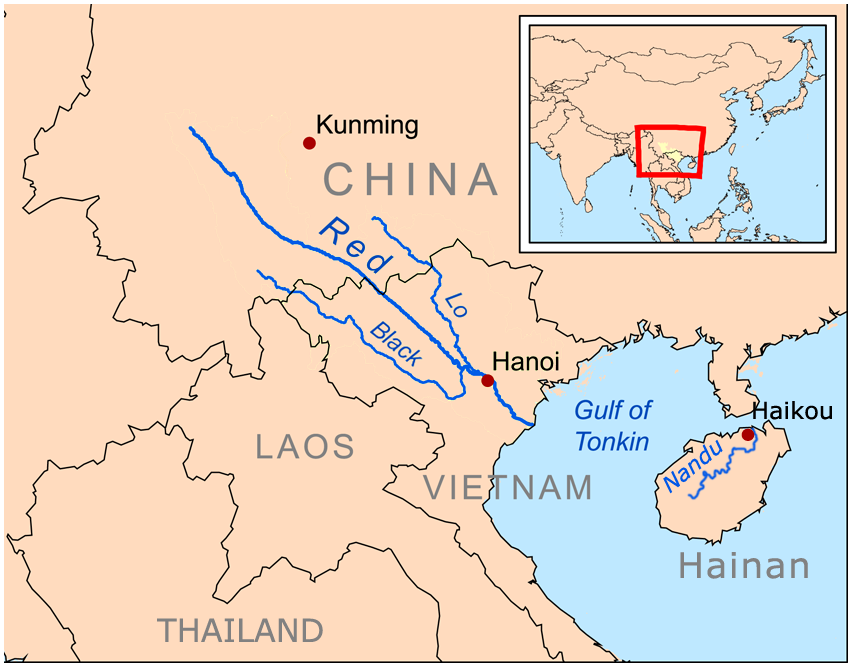
Map

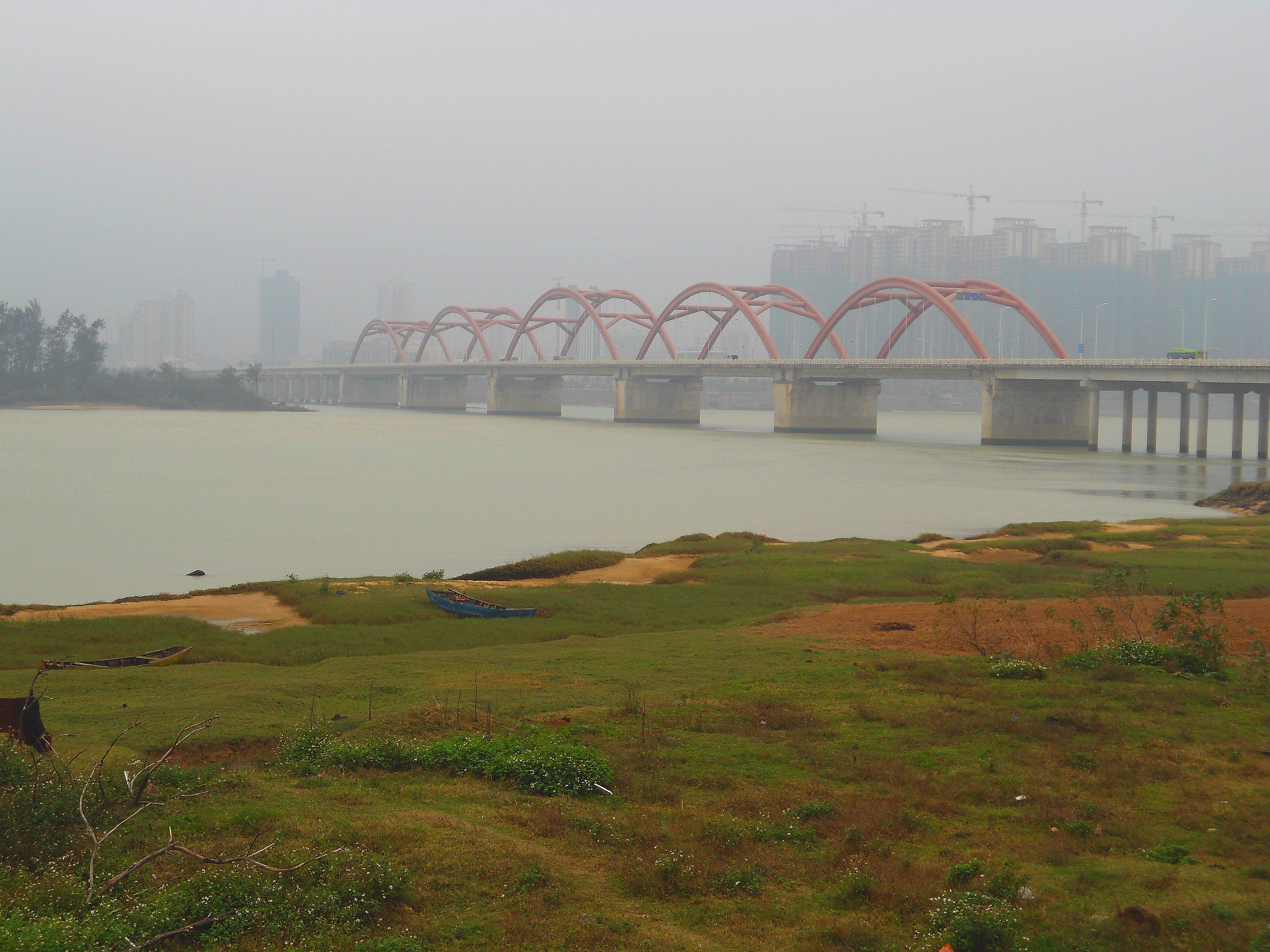
Qiongzhou Bridge

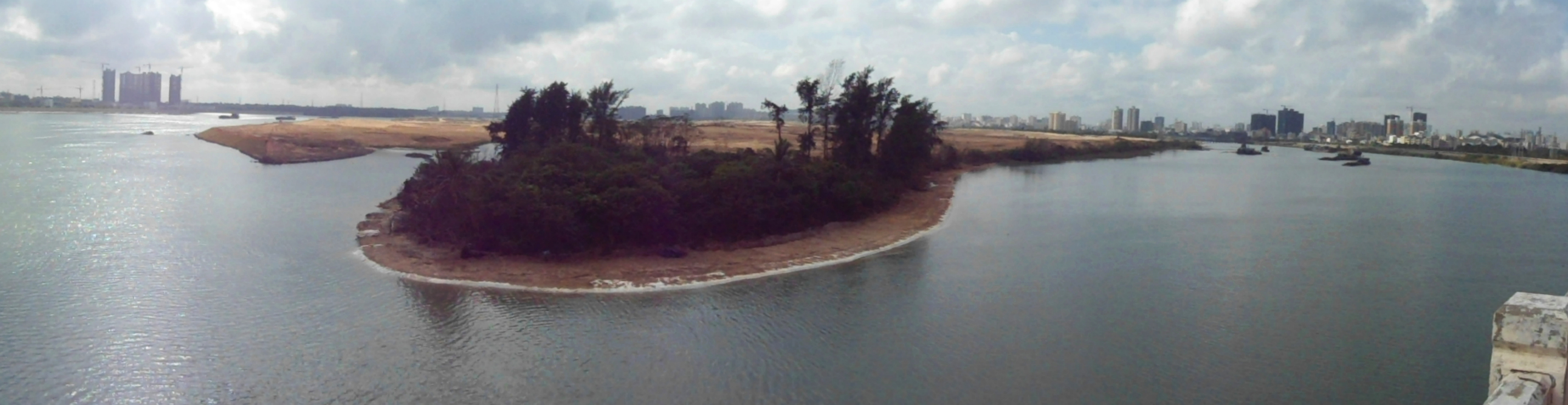
Simapo Island

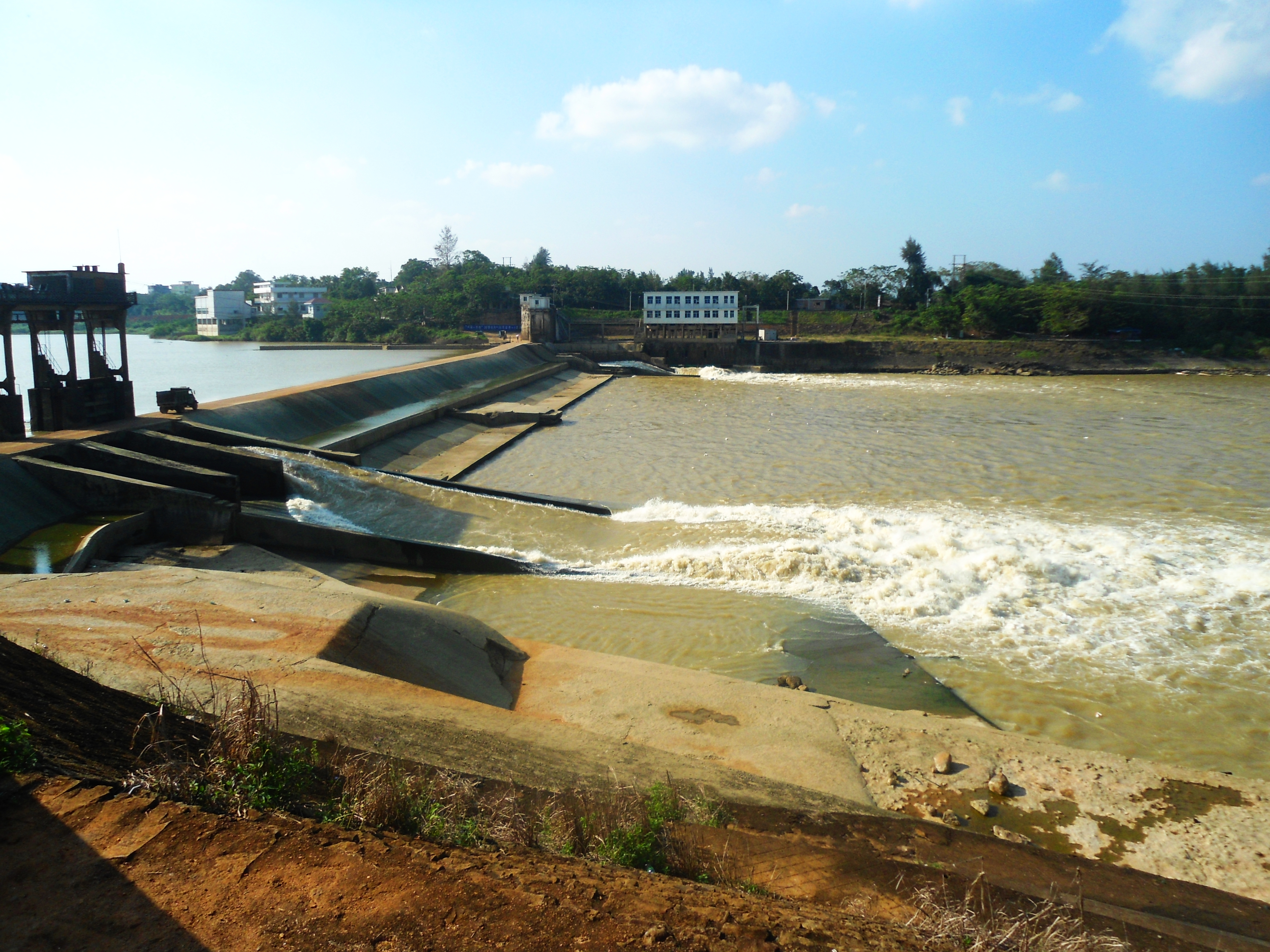
Nandu River Dam located by Longtang

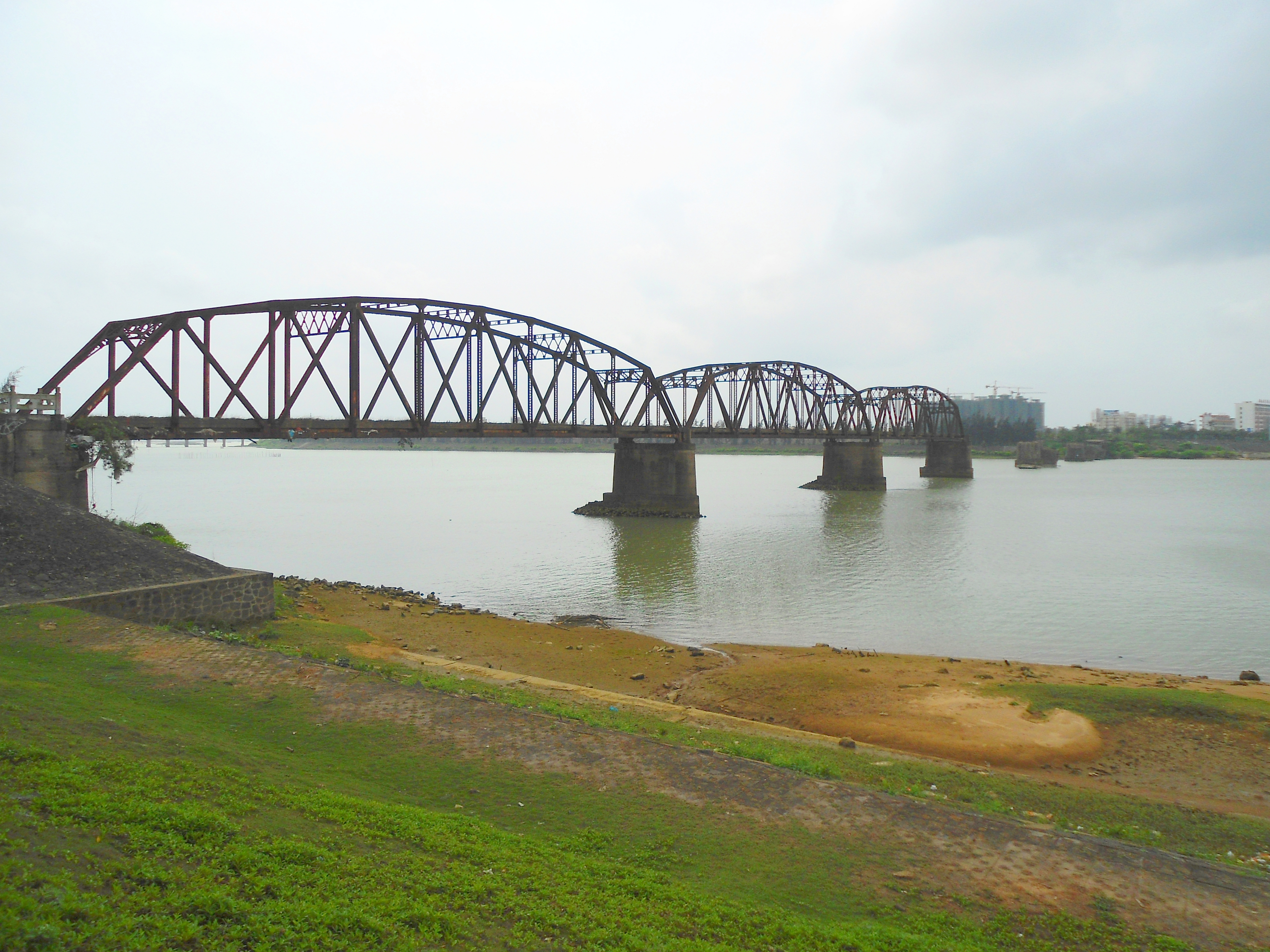
Nandu River Iron Bridge

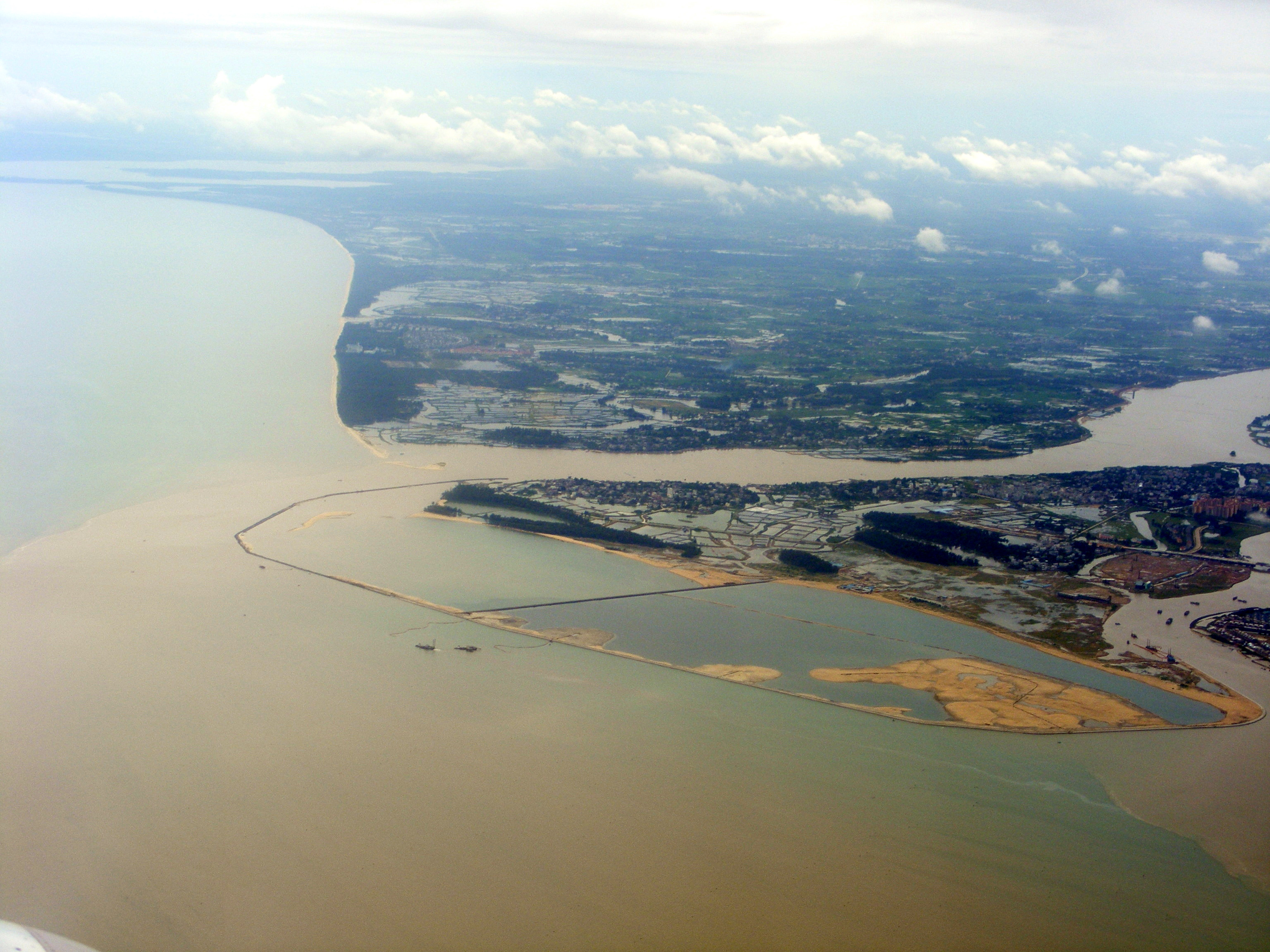
End of Nandu river flowing around Xinbu Island (right) into Qiongzhou Strait (left)

== See also ==
- List of rivers in China
- Haikou Nandu River Water Diversion Project
