= List of islands of Hainan =

There are many islands directly off the coast of Hainan Island, the southernmost province in China. This article lists them. There are also groups of disputed islands located hundreds of kilometres away that are within Hainan, the administrative area, but not actually part of Hainan, the province. Those islands are not within the scope of this article.

Name	Image	Notes
Beigang Island		Located in the mouth of the Dongzhai Harbor, this island has three villages and a population of 1,550.
Boundary Island		This is an island in Lingshui County between Lingshui and Wanning, in Riyue Bay. It is the earliest development of an open uninhabited tourist type area. In 2008 it became a national 4A level scenic spot, and in 2013 was promoted to national 5A-class tourist attraction, becoming China's first.
Dazhou Island		Commonly known as Grand Island, this is a state-level nature reserve located about 5 km (3.1 mi) off the coast of Wanning, Hainan, China. This protected area covers 4.36 square kilometres, and comprises three mountains spanning two islands. The islands are composed of mainly rain forests and rocky terrain.
Dongmaozhou		This island is located in Sanya Bay.
Fenjiezhou		Sea turtles are known to lay eggs on this island, which is off the coast of Lingshui.
Ganzhe Island		This island is located in near Wanning in Chunyuan Bay.
Haidian Island		This is a well-developed and heavily populated island that is part of the city of Haikou. It is located over the Haidian River and directly to the east of Xinbu Island.
Artificial island at Hainan International Convention And Exhibition Center		Part of the Hainan International Convention And Exhibition Center, this island is currently under construction. A hotel will be built on it.
Jiajing Island		This unpopulated island is located off the coast of Wanning around 3 km off the coast of Shimei Bay.
Huludao Island		Located a few hundred metres from Evergreen Park (Haikou), this peanut-shaped island was demolished in 2021 after lasting for 11 years.
Nanwan Monkey Island		Actually a peninsula, but commonly considered to be an island, this body of land is a monkey nature reserve and tourist attraction.
Ocean Flower Island		This is an under-construction, artificial archipelago located off the north coast of Hainan, west of Yangpu Peninsula.
Phoenix Island		This is an artificial archipelago forming an island resort currently under construction in Sanya, Hainan Province, China. The island is located in Sanya Bay, and is 1,250 metres (4,100 ft) long by 350 metres (1,150 ft) wide and covers a total area of 393,825 square metres (4,239,100 sq ft). It is connected the shore by a 395-metre bridge.
Ruyi Island		Located approximately 3 km northeast of Haidian Island, this is an under-construction artificial island.
Simapo Island		Located in the Nandu River directly to the south of the Qiongzhou Bridge, this island was once farmland, and is now being developed as a golf course.
Wuzhizhou Island		This island is located off the coast of Hainan Province, China. This 1.48 square kilometre island is situated within Haitang Bay, approximately 30 kilometres northeast of Sanya, between Nanwan Monkey Island to the north, and Yalong Bay to the south.
Ximaozhou		This island is located in Sanya Bay.
Xinbu Island		This island is located directly to the east of Haidian Island
Zhouzai Island		Zhouzai Island is off the coast of Wanning. It has an area of .75 hectares.
Nanhai Pearl Artificial Island		This is an under-construction island owned by HNA Group off the coast of Holiday Beach
