= Nanhai Pearl Artificial Island =

Artificial island in Haikou, China

Coordinates: 20.072°N 110.236°E

Nanhai Pearl Artificial Island 南海明珠人工岛
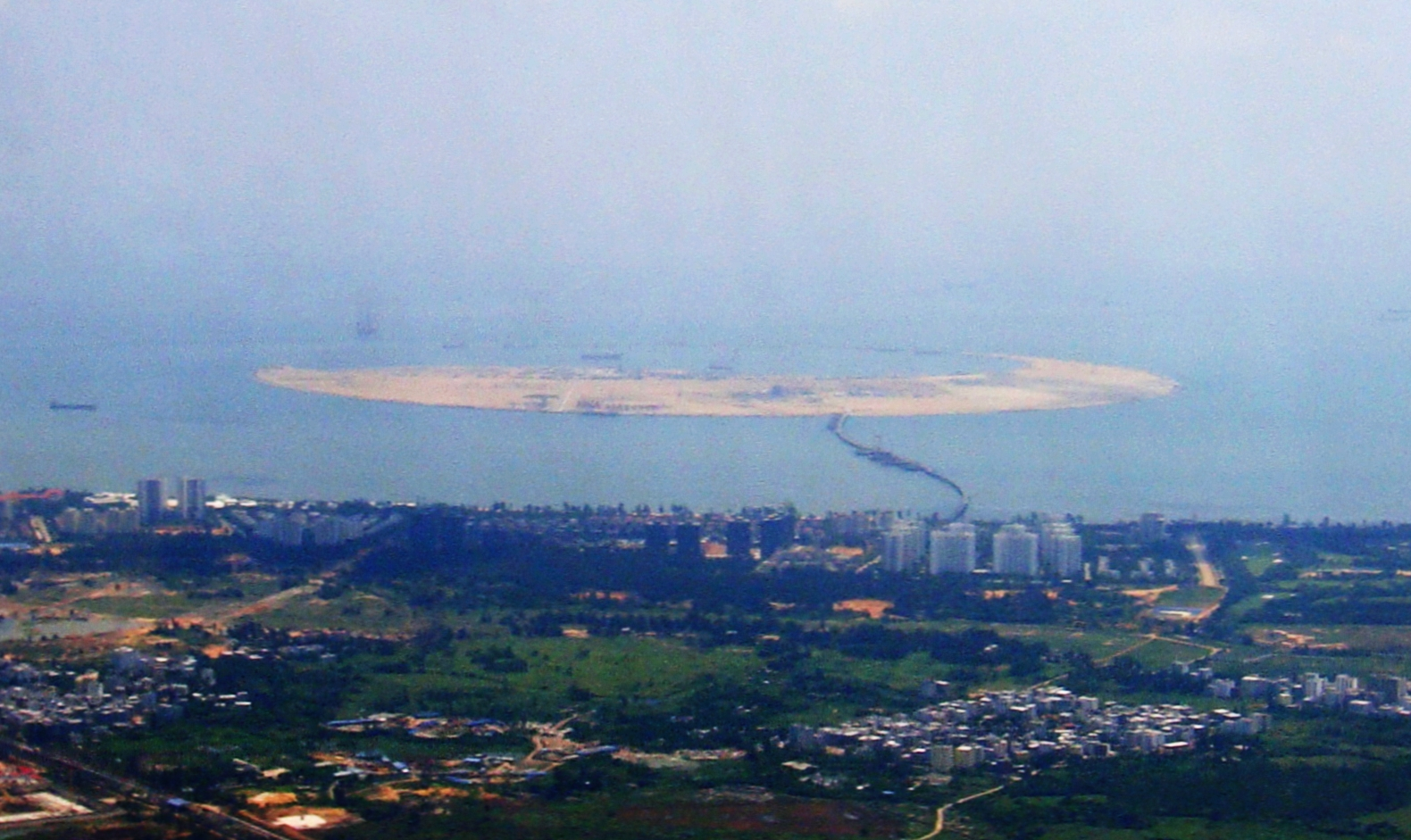
- Nanhai Pearl Artificial Island in May 2016
- Interactive map of Nanhai Pearl Artificial Island 南海明珠人工岛

Geography
- Location: Off the coast of Holiday Beach, Hainan, China
- Adjacent to: Haikou Bay
- Total islands: 1
- Area: 3 km^{2} (1.2 sq mi)

Administration
- China

Nanhai Pearl Artificial Island (Chinese: 南海明珠人工岛) is an artificial island under construction off the coast of Holiday Beach in Haikou Bay, Haikou, Hainan, China. The island is owned and being developed by HNA Group. As of April 2016, it consists of a roughly circular body of land with a bridge providing access to and from the shore. It is envisioned to ultimately become a visitor attraction with hotels and to eventually take the shape of a yin-yang symbol and be about 266 hectares.

== See also ==
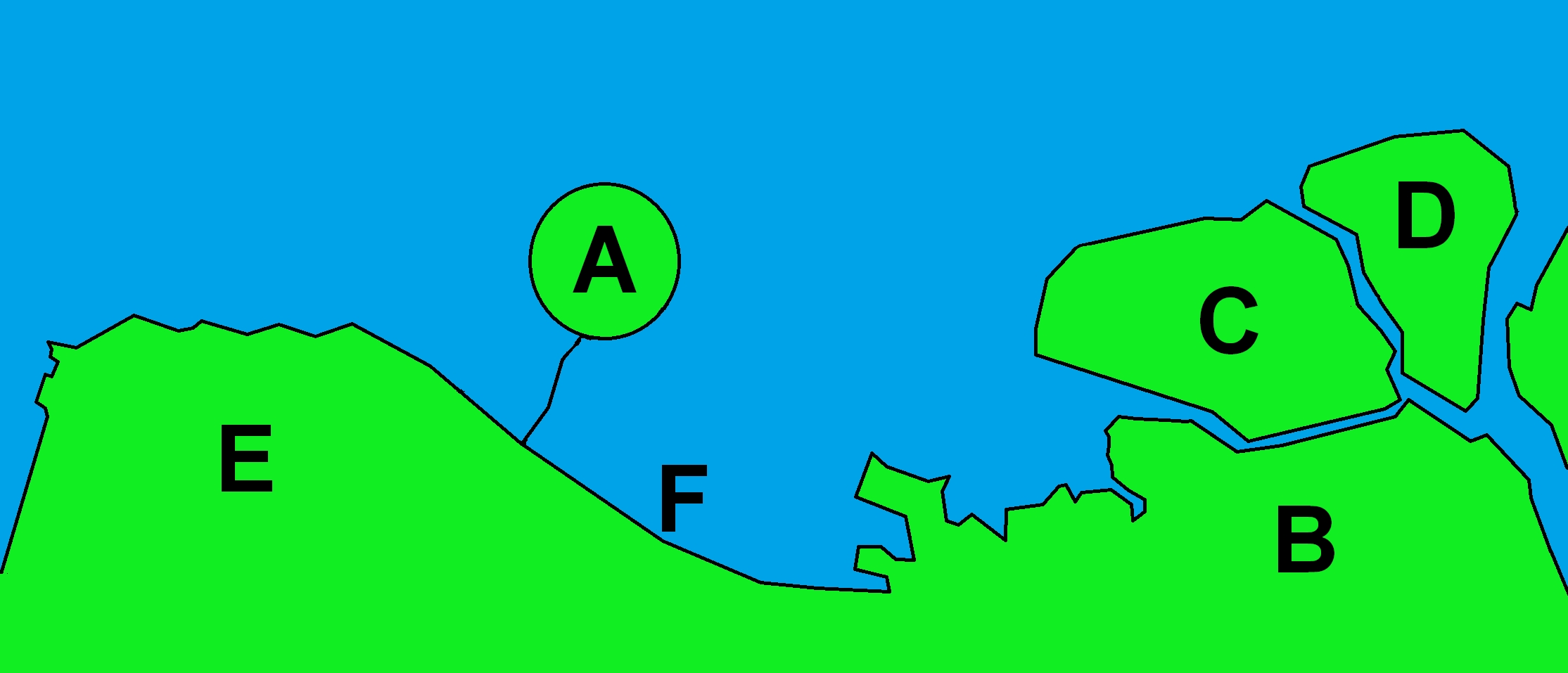
A: Nanhai Pearl Artificial Island; B: Downtown Haikou; C: Haidian Island; D: Xinbu Island; E: Haikou West Coast; F: Holiday Beach

- Other artificial island in Hainan reclaimed for residential and/or tourism purpose:
  - Haikou: Ruyi Island, Huludao, etc.
  - Sanya: Phoenix Island
  - Danzhou: Ocean Flower Island
