= Ruyi =

Rúyì (如意 "as desired") may refer to:

- Ruyi Bridge, a bridge in Taizhou, Zhejiang, China
- Ruyi (scepter), ceremonial Buddhist scepter or a talisman
- Ruyi Island, off the coast of Haikou, Hainan
- Ruyi Lake, near Chengde, Hebei
- Ruyi, Shaoshan, a town in Shaoshan city, Hunan

== See also ==
- Liu Ruyi (208–195 BC), prince of the Chinese Han dynasty
