= Holiday Beach =

Holiday Beach may refer to:

- Holiday Beach, Texas
- Holiday Beach, Hainan, China
