= Wuyuan River =

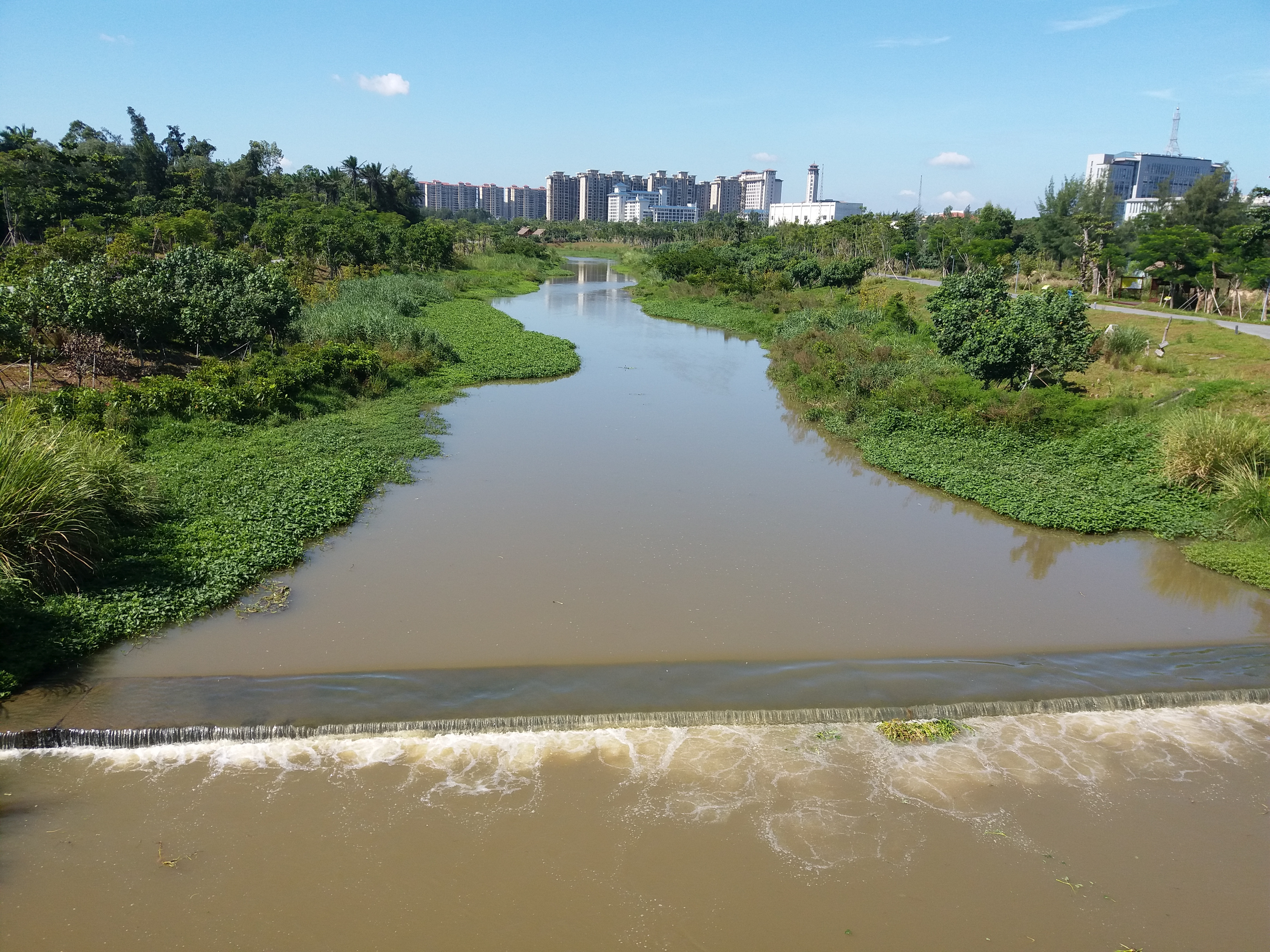
- A view of the river as it runs through the Wuyuan River National Wetland Park, facing south, about 100 metres away from the coast, Haikou Bay

Location
- Country: People's Republic of China
- Province: Hainan
- Prefecture-level city: Haikou

Physical characteristics
- Mouth: Haikou Bay
  - coordinates: 20°03′31″N 110°12′25″E

The Wuyuan River is a small river in Haikou, Hainan, China. It runs from the Yonghuang Reservoir, through the Wuyuan River National Wetland Park, and empties into Haikou Bay.
