= Phoenix Island =

Artificial archipelago in Hainan, China

Coordinates: 18.242401°N 109.490354°E

Phoenix Island 凤凰岛
- Artificial archipelago
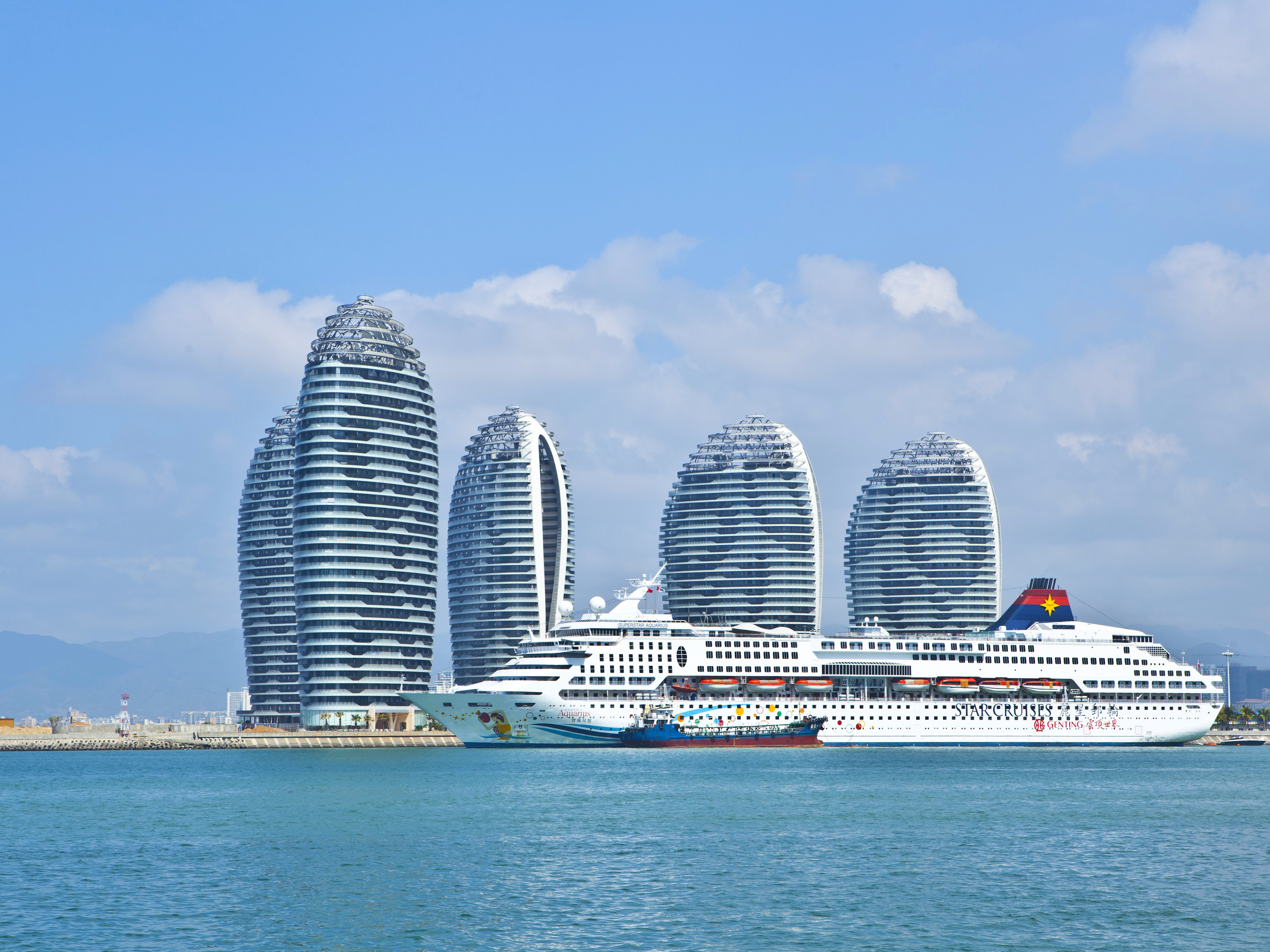
- Phoenix Island during construction in 2012 viewed from the east
- Nickname: Oriental Dubai
- Interactive map of Phoenix Island
- Country: China
- Province: Hainan
- Prefecture-level city: Sanya

Area
  - Total: 3.94 km^{2} (1.52 sq mi)
- Elevation: 0 m (0 ft)
- Time zone: UTC+08:00 (China Standard)
- Postal code: 572100
- Area code: (0)898

Phoenix Island (simplified Chinese: 凤凰岛; traditional Chinese: 鳳凰島; pinyin: Fènghuáng Dǎo), dubbed the Oriental Dubai, is an artificial island resort in Sanya, Hainan Province, China.

== Description ==
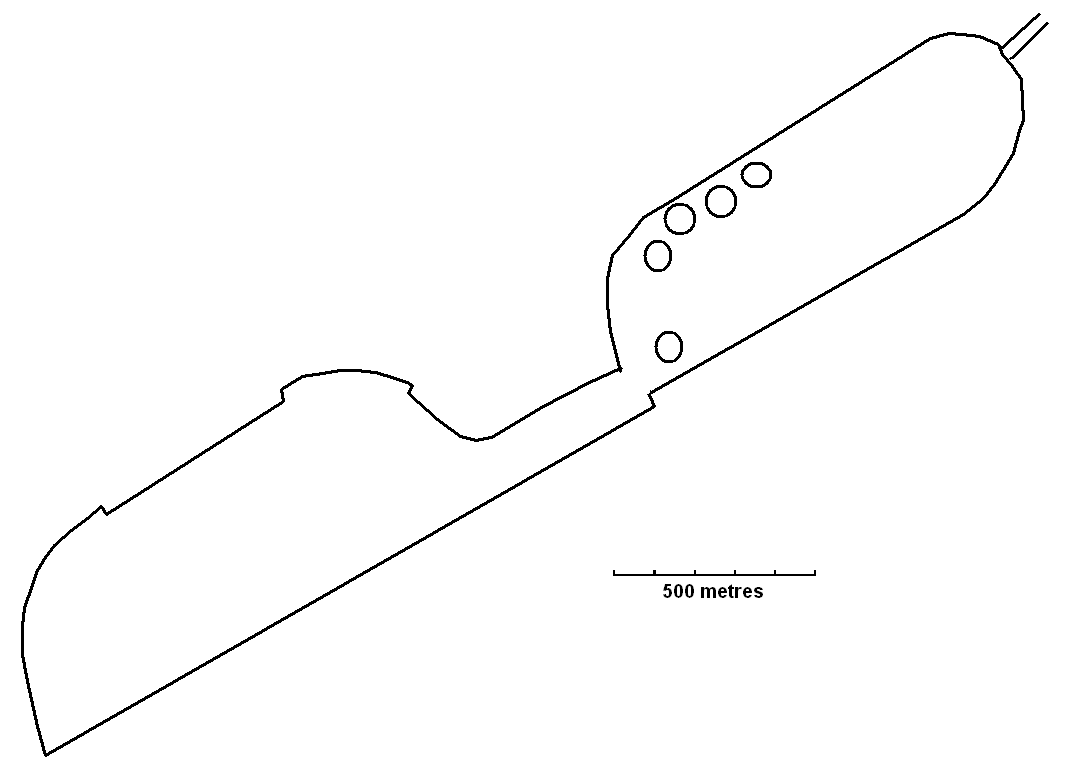
The eastern island is developed. The western island is still under construction

The island is located in the southeast part of Sanya Bay. It is 1,250 metres (4,100 ft) long by 350 metres (1,150 ft) wide and covers a total area of 393,825 square metres (4,239,100 sq ft). It is connected to the shore by a 395-metre bridge.

A second island is under construction to the west, which will be similar in size and shape, and connected to the existing island by a short, narrow strip of land. The original concept design and master plan for the island was developed by Leisure Quest International, LLC (USA).

== Development ==
The project's program was developed by Leisure Quest International (USA) as was the development's Conceptual Design and Master Plan. The development was sold in 2006 to a Shanghai Developer. The design development of the project was undertaken by Beijing architectural firm MAD Studio, who won the contract in 2007, total investment in the project exceeds 3 billion RMB (approximately $464 million). It was due for completion in 2014.

Prices of luxury residential units on Phoenix Island range from 50,000 RMB to 100,000 RMB per square metre, (approximately $7,700 to $15,400 USD), comparable to high-end properties in Beijing and Shanghai.

Google Earth imagery dated 21 February 2020 shows that the Western Island was being used by the China Coast Guard as a mooring for some of its larger ocean-going patrol vessels. The western island has been removed as of June 2022.

== Components ==
The eastern island is divided into eight main sections, and includes:

- 200-meter-high signature seven-star hotel
- Five-star hotel
- Five 28-storey buildings
- Six luxury apartment buildings
- Conference centre
- Ferry terminal
- Harbour for cruise ships
- Marina with 150–300 yacht berths
- Yacht clubhouse
- Restaurants
- Shopping complex
- Shopping street
- Sports and recreational area
- Theme park

== See also ==
- Nanhai Pearl Artificial Island, an under-construction island in Haikou Bay
- Palm Islands
