= Wuyuan River National Wetland Park =

Park in Haikou, China

- 五源河国家湿地公园
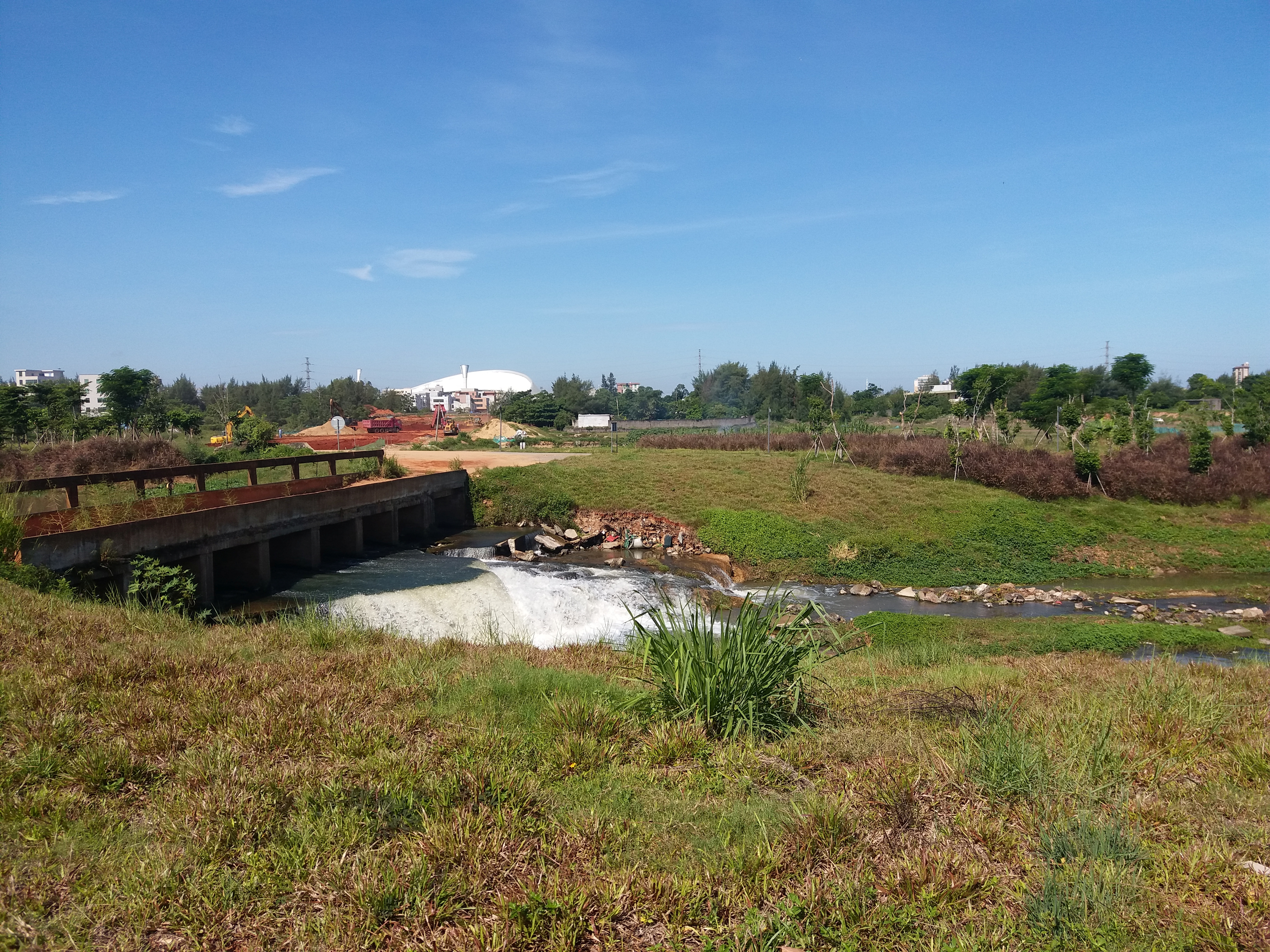
- The park showing the Wuyuan River, looking west with the Wuyuan River Stadium in the background
- Location: Haikou, Hainan, China
- Status: Open all year
- Habitats: Waterfowl
- Water: Wuyuan River

The Wuyuan River National Wetland Park (Chinese: 五源河国家湿地公园) is an eco-park on the banks for the Wuyuan River in Haikou, Hainan, China. The Wuyuan River runs through its entirety. The park has green areas and a pathway on either side of this small river.
