= Haikou Century Bridge =

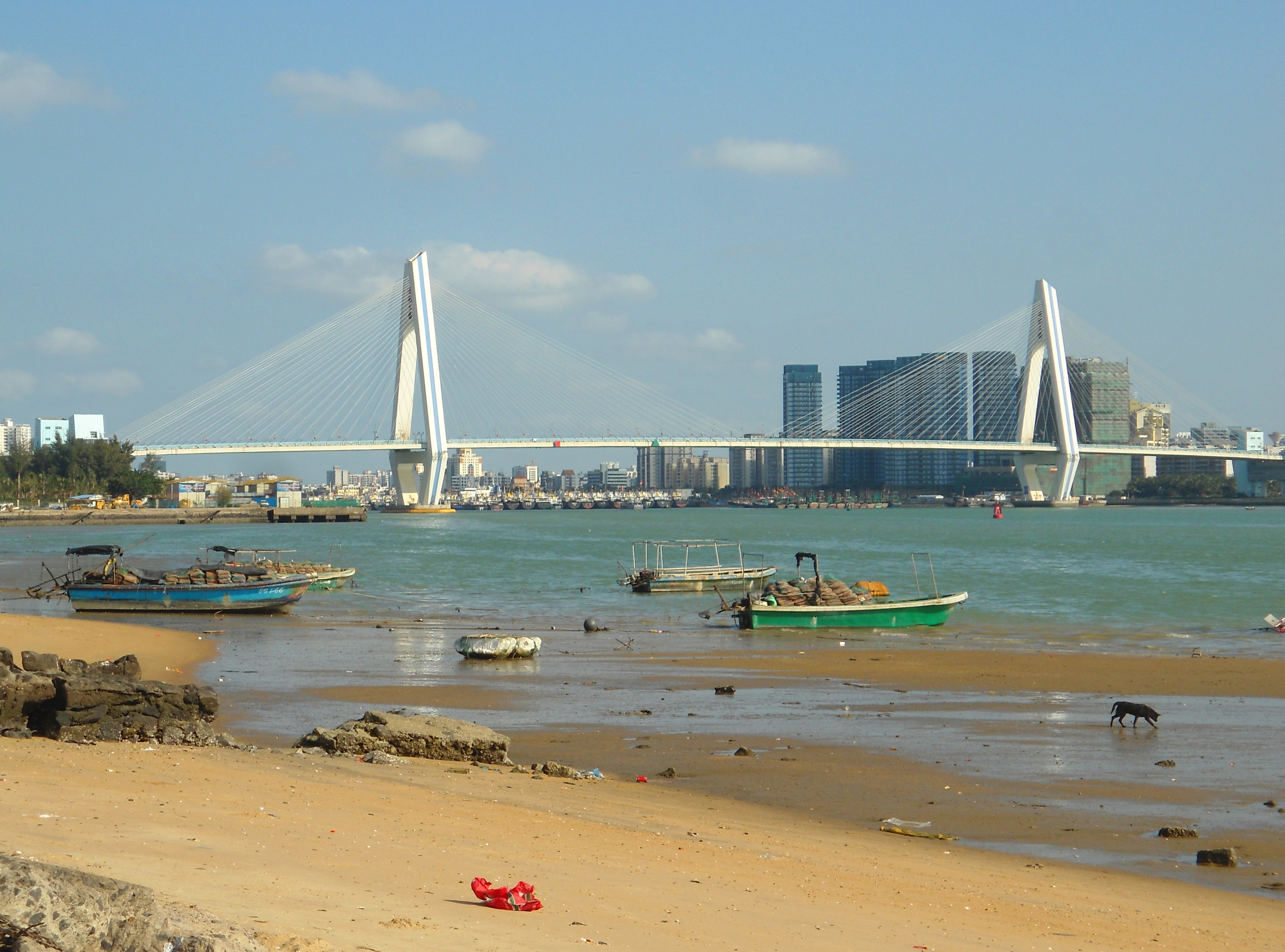
- A view from the southwest shore of Haidian Island at the mouth of the Nandu River
- Coordinates: 20°03′6.5″N 110°18′56″E
- Crosses: Nandu River
- Locale: Haikou, Hainan

Characteristics
- Design: Cable-stayed bridge
- Total length: 2,683 metres (8,802 ft)
- Width: 29.8 metres (98 ft)
- Longest span: 395 metres (1,296 ft)

History
- Opened: August 1, 2003

Location
- Interactive map of Haikou Century Bridge

Haikou Century Bridge (simplified Chinese: 海口世纪大桥; traditional Chinese: 海口世紀大橋; pinyin: Hǎikǒu Shìjì Dàqiáo) is a cable-stayed bridge in Haikou city, the capital of Hainan province, China.

The bridge was built to link the main part of Haikou city to Haidian Island, a district separated from Hainan Island by the Haidian River. Haikou Century Bridge crosses at the mouth of the river approximately 50 metres west of Haikou New Port.

== History ==
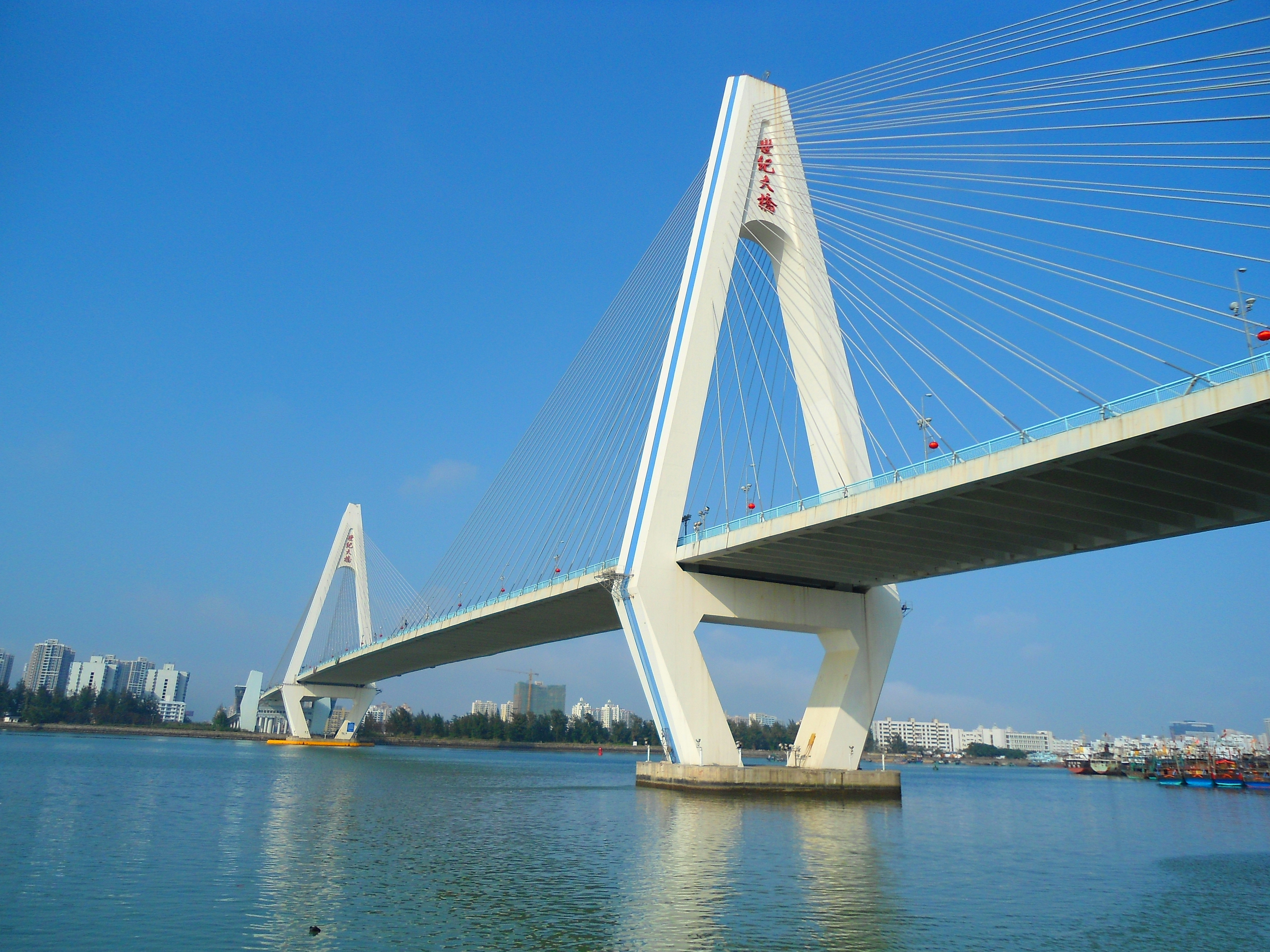
Close-up of the bridge

The project was started in 1998 and was opened to traffic on August 1, 2003.

Haikou Century Bridge is the largest bridge on Hainan Island spanning 2,683 meters in length and 29.8 meters in width. It is available for automotive traffic only.

The cost of the Century Bridge project was approximately 660 million Renminbi (US$80 million). The bridge was built by China Wanbao Engineering Corp.
