= Haidian River =

Coordinates: 20.012186°N 110.374382°E

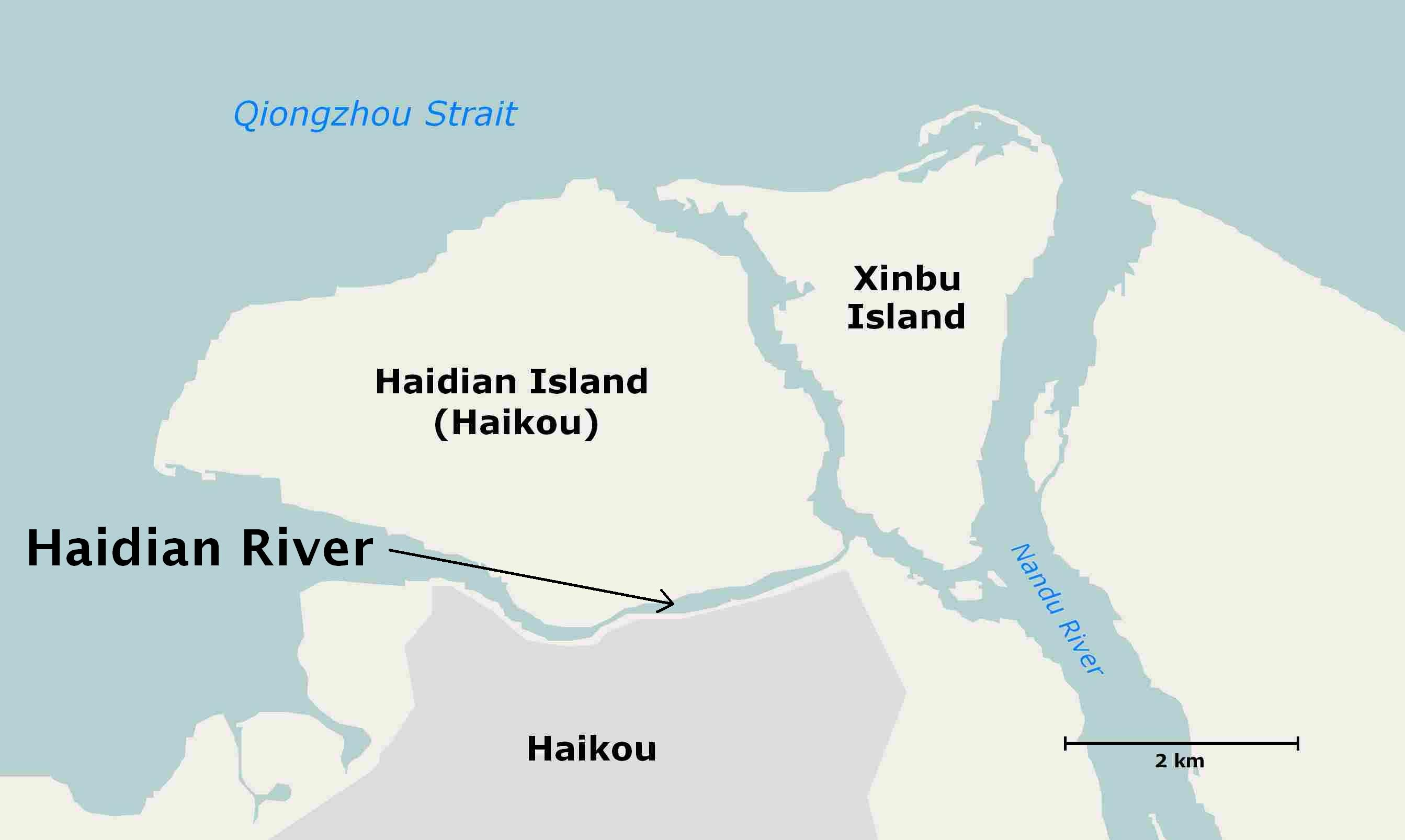

Location
- Country: People's Republic of China
- Province: Hainan
- Prefecture-level city: Haikou

Physical characteristics
- Mouth
  - location: Haikou Bay, Qiongzhou Strait

The Haidian River (Chinese: 海甸溪; pinyin: Hǎidiànxī) runs through Haikou City, separating the main part of and its northern part Haidian Island, in Hainan province. Its tributary is the Nandu River.

There are three bridges that cross the river:

- Haikou Century Bridge near the mouth of the Haidian River at Haikou Bay.
- Renmin Bridge (人民大桥) crosses a narrow section of the Haidian River linking Changdi Road (长堤路) with Renmin Avenue (人民大道).
- Heping Bridge (和平大桥) connects Changdi Road and Heping Avenue (和平大桥) across the Haidian River.

Haikou New Port is located on the south bank of this river.

== Gallery ==
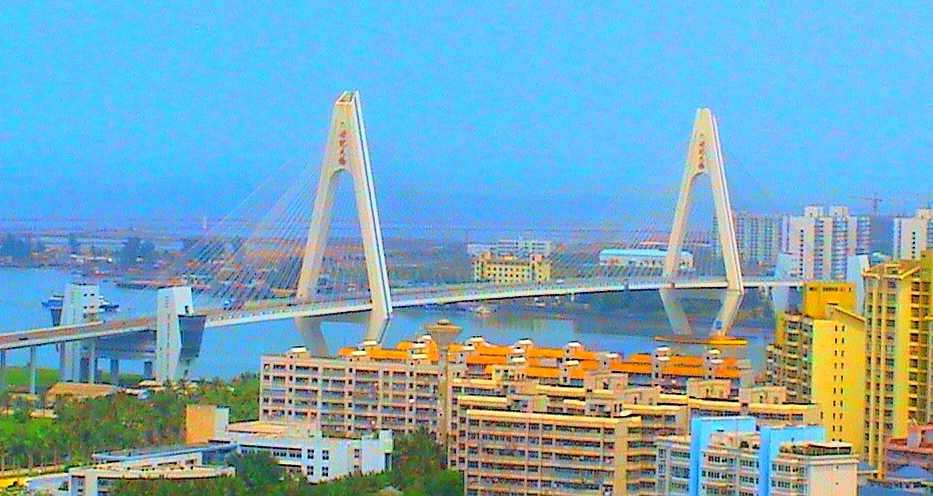
Haikou Century Bridge crossing the Haidian River at its mouth at Haikou Bay

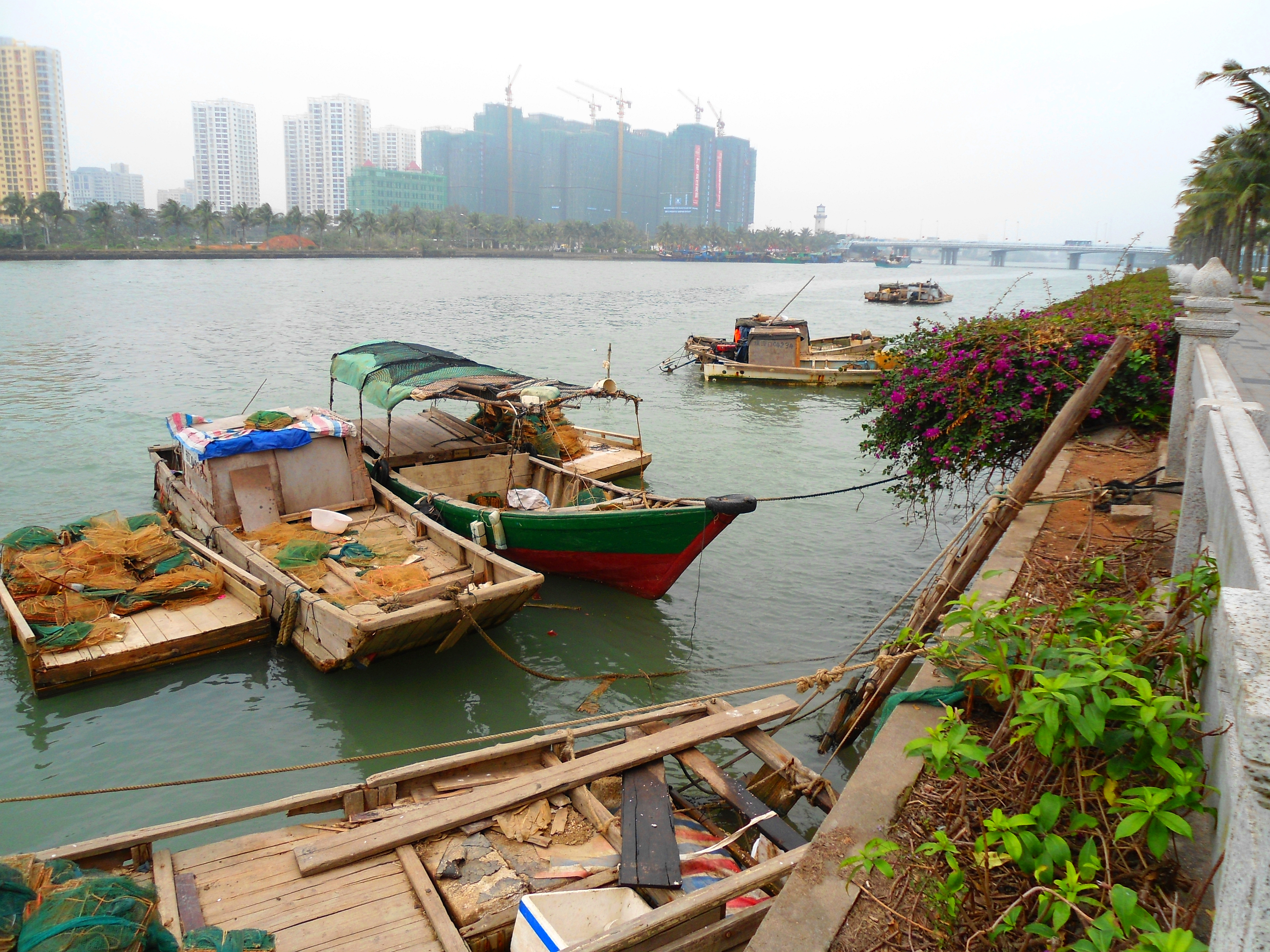
A view from the south side, about midpoint of the length of the river, facing east, with Haidian Island on the opposite bank, with Heping Bridge visible in background.

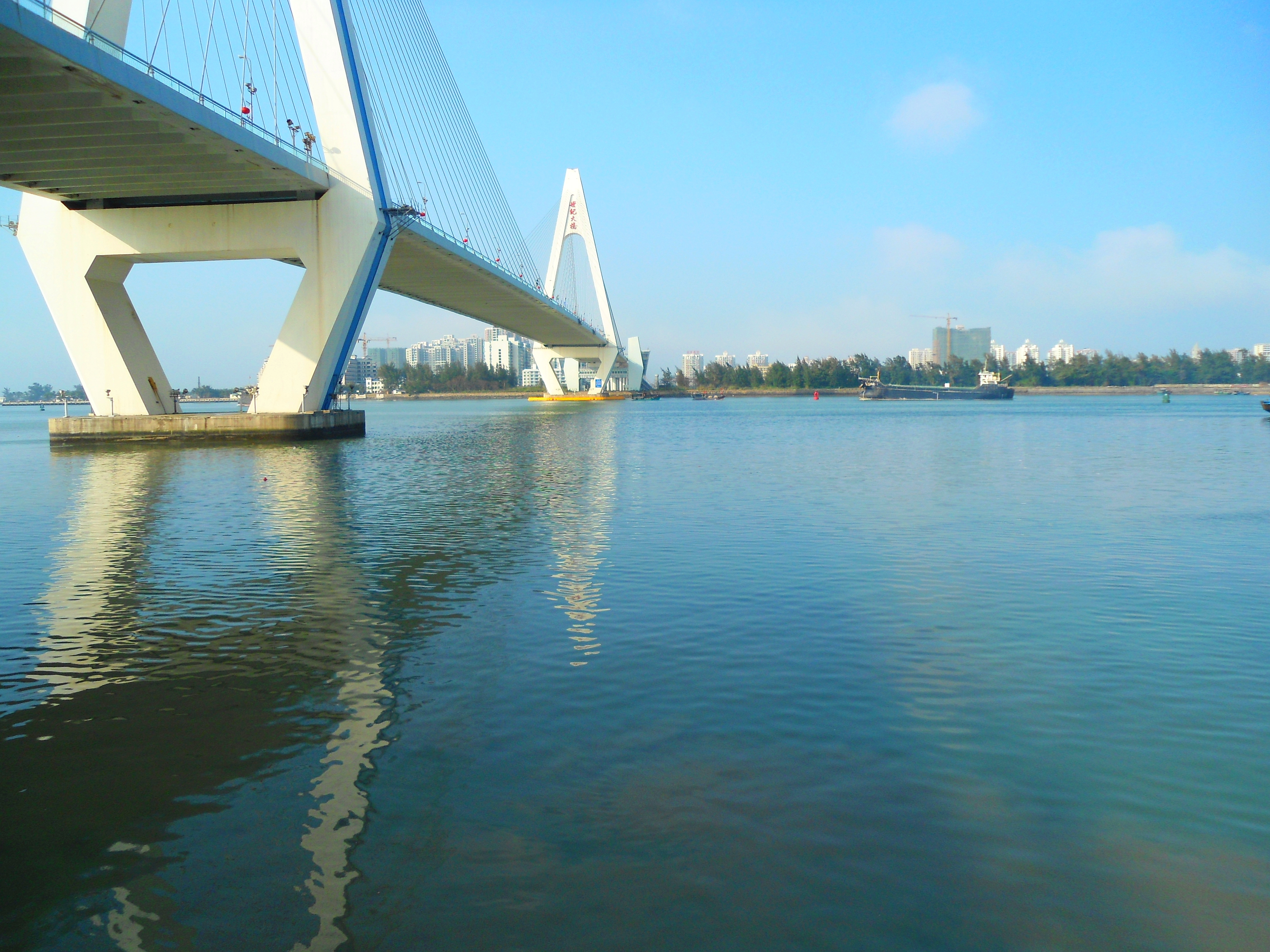
Mouth of the Haidian River entering Haikou Bay, with Haikou Century Bridge on the left, and Haidian Island on the opposite shore.

== See also ==
- List of rivers in China
