= Huludao Island =

Peanut-shaped island in Haikou Bay, China

Hulu Island
Native name: 葫芦岛
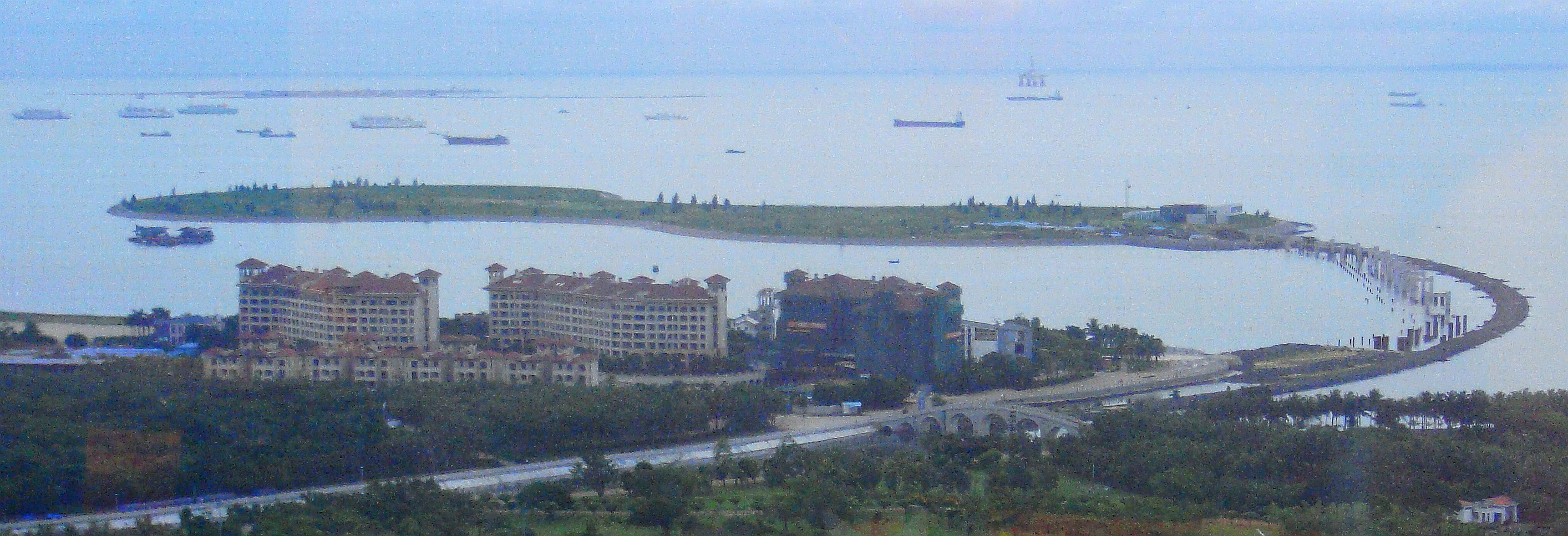
- A view of the island from Evergreen Park

- Location within the Hainan province

Geography
- Location: Haikou Bay
- Coordinates: 20.0437°N 110.296°E
- Area: 35 ha (86 acres)

Administration
- China
- Province: Hainan
- Prefecture-level city: Haikou
- District: Longhua District

Additional information
- Time zone: China Standard Time (UTC+08:00)

Hulu Island (Chinese: 葫芦岛; pinyin: Húlu Dǎo) or Huludao was an artificial island in the Longhua District, Haikou, Hainan Province, China, that lasted from 2010 to 2021.
