= Haitang Bay =

Bay in Sanya, Hainan, China

Haitang Bay 海棠湾
- Location within Hainan
- Location: Lingshui, Hainan, China
- Coordinates: 18.309225°N 109.736080°E
- Ocean/sea sources: South China Sea
- Max. width: 42.8 km (26.6 mi)

Haitang Bay (Chinese: 海棠湾; pinyin: Hǎitáng Wān) is one of the five major bays in Sanya, Hainan Province, China.

This 42.8 km (26.6 mi) beach is located in Haitangwan Town, Sanya, and Yingzhou Town, Lingshui. To its south are Yalong Bay and Wuzhizhou Island.

A number of resort hotels are located along the beach. Atlantis Sanya opened in 2018. The resort cost US$1.74 billion. The total area is 540,000 square metres (54 ha; 130 acres) and has 1,314 hotel rooms.
