= Nanwan Monkey Island =

Island off the coast of China

Coordinates: 18°23′N 109°59′E

- 南湾猴岛自然保护区
- Location: Hainan, China
- Services: Nature reserve
- Website: monkeyisland.com.cn

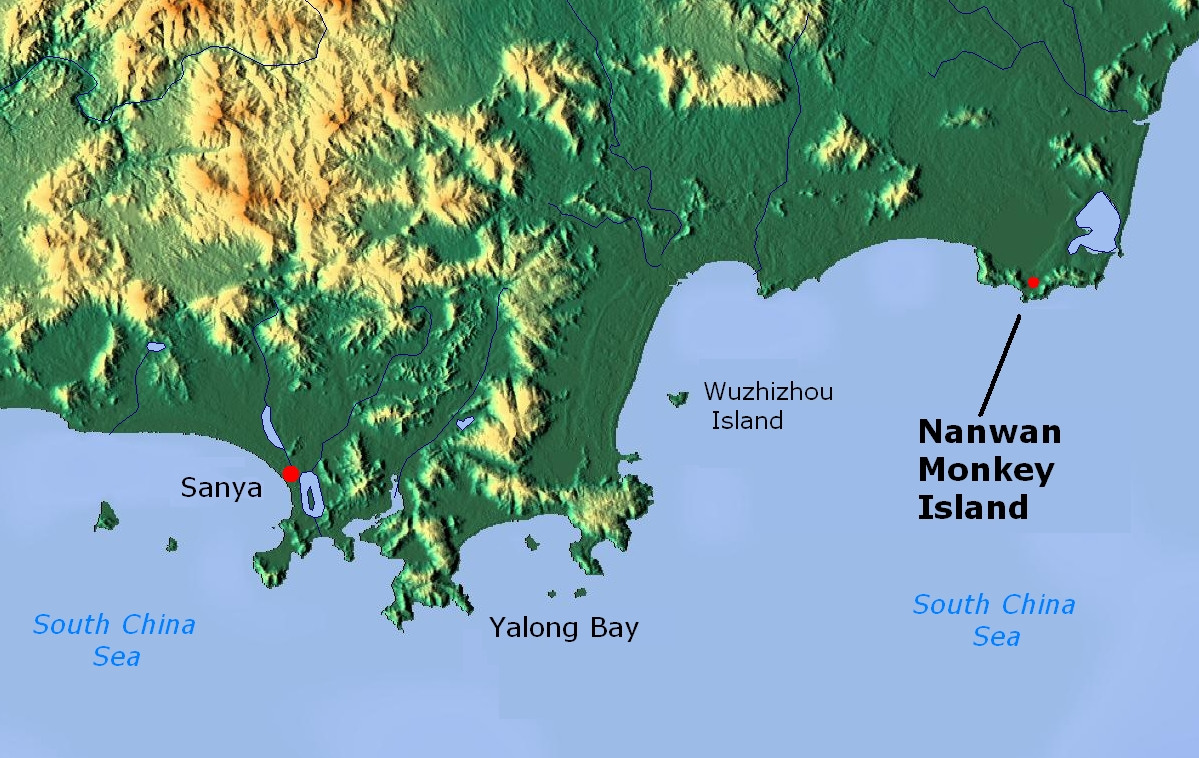
Nanwan Monkey Island shown east of Wuzhizhou Island, Yalong Bay, and Sanya

Nanwan Monkey Island (Chinese: 南湾猴岛自然保护区; pinyin: Nánwān hóudǎo zìránbǎohùqū) is a state-protected nature reserve for macaque monkeys in Lingshui county on the south coast of Hainan, the southernmost province of China. While termed an island, the reserve is actually on the Nanwan peninsula bordering the Xincun harbour on the east and south. It is accessible by China's longest over-water cable car from Xincun, spanning 2,138 metres (7,014 ft).

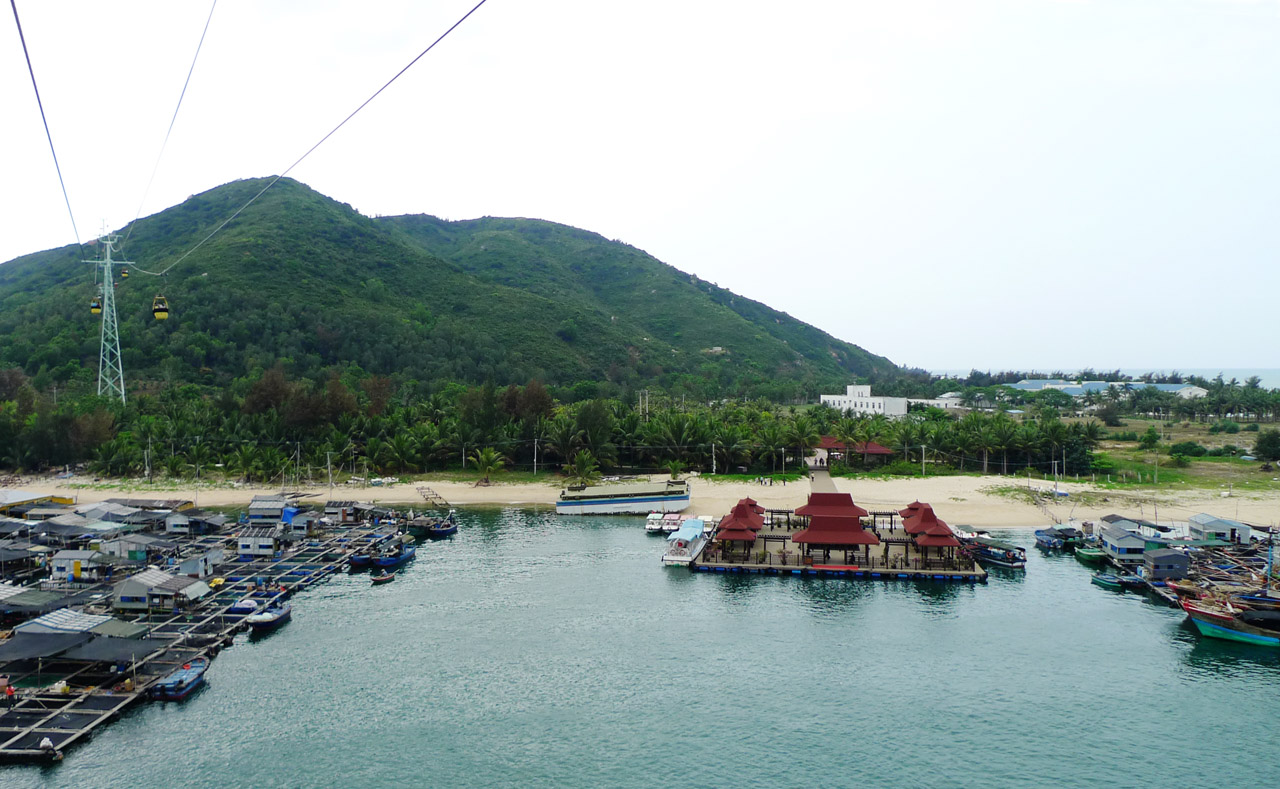
A view of the cable car and the Nanwan peninsula from Xincun, Lingshui County

Since the nature reserve was established in 1965, the reserve has become a popular tourist destination. It is now home to approximately 2,000 monkeys. The reserve, totalling 1,000 hectares, is China's largest area for raising and training monkeys. It is also the only island nature reserve that protects the endangered macaques species in the world.
