= Ruyi Lake =

Lake in Zhengzhou, Henan, China

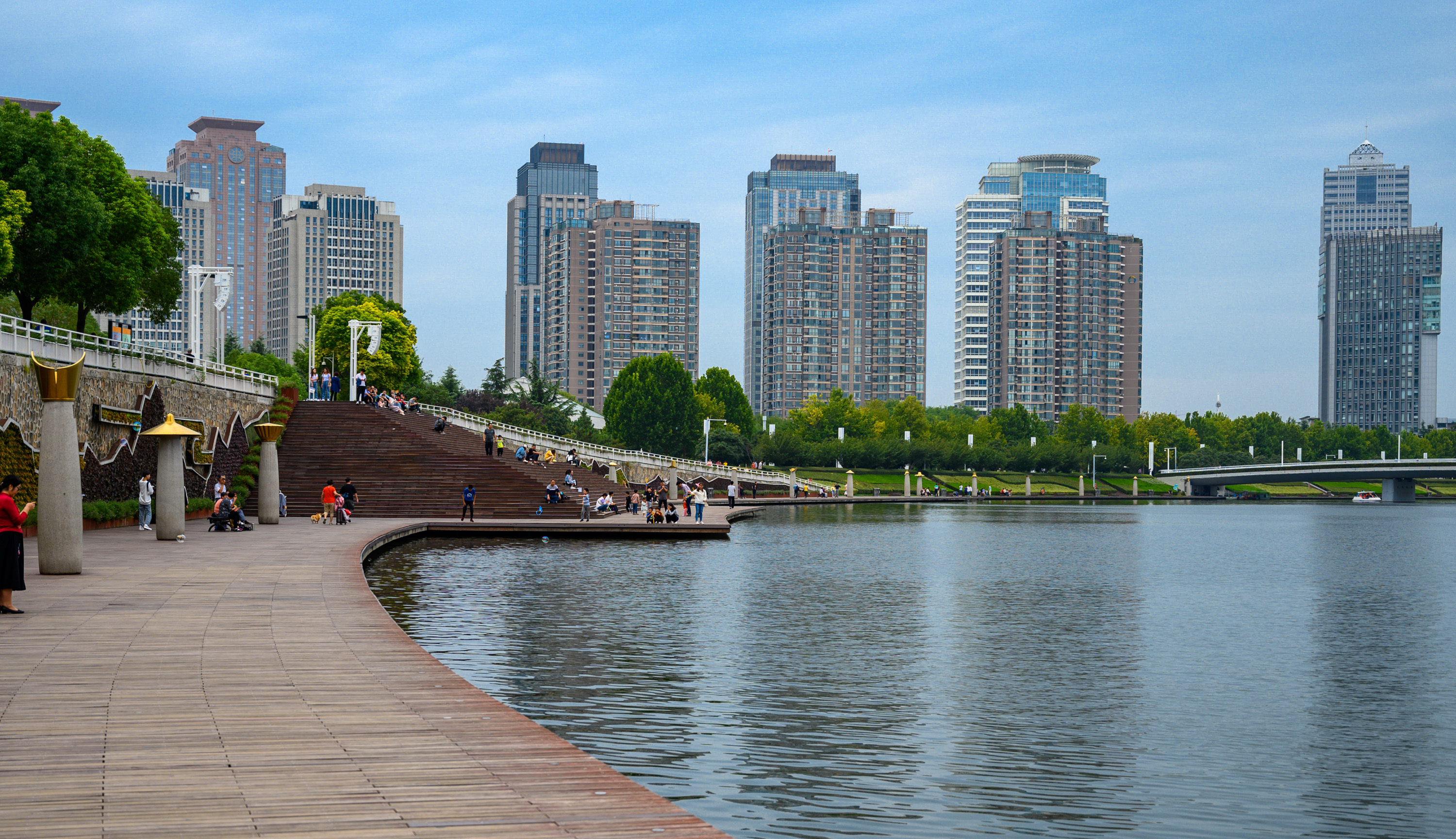

- Location within Henan
- Location: Jinshui District, Zhengzhou, Henan
- Coordinates: 34°46′21″N 113°43′37″E

Ruyi Lake (Chinese: 如意湖; pinyin: Rúyì Hú) is a small artificial lake located in the city of Zhengzhou, Henan, China.
