= Ocean Flower Island =

Artificial archipelago in Danzhou, Hainan

Ocean Flower Island 海花岛
- Artificial archipelago
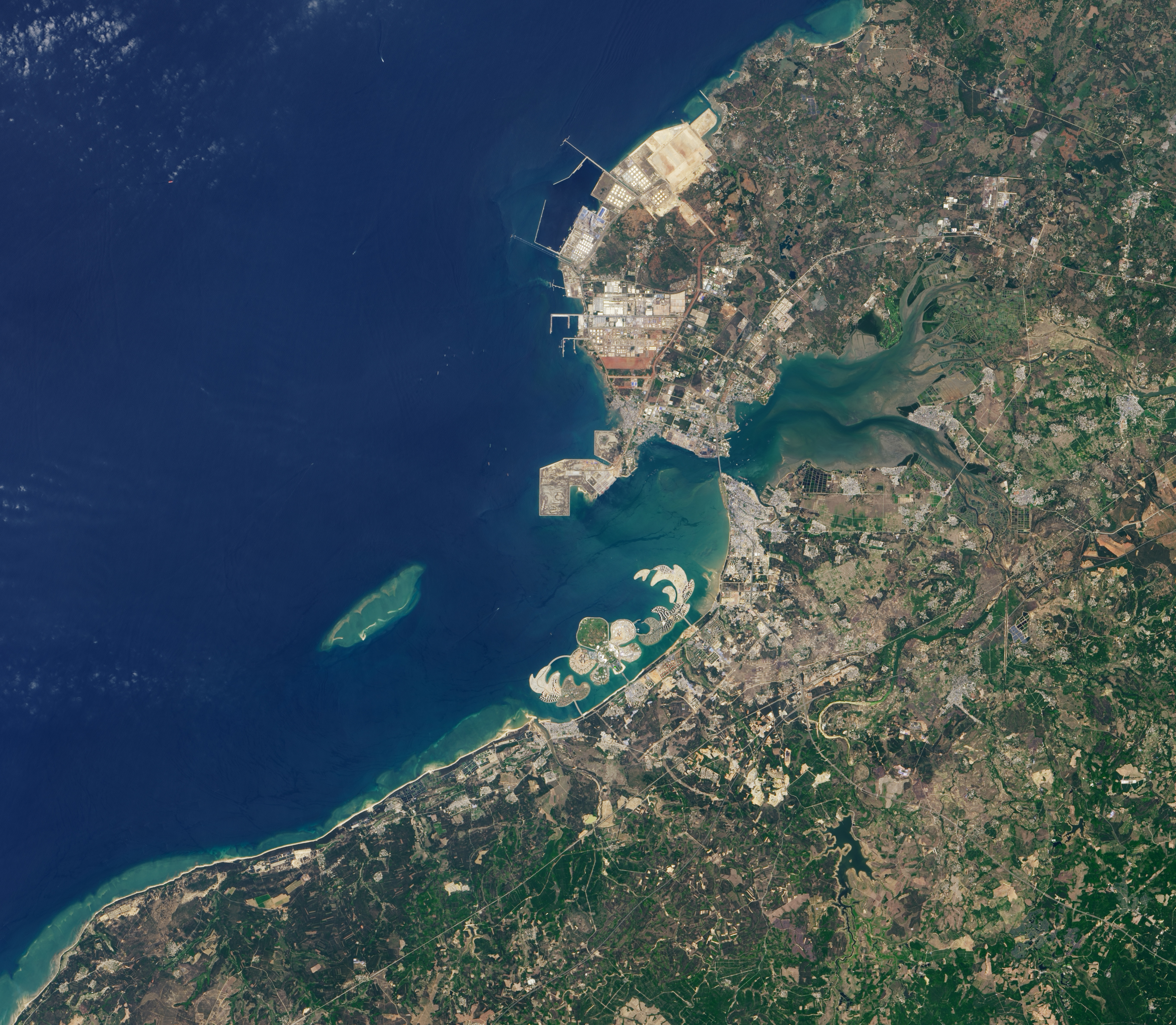
- Interactive map of Ocean Flower Island
- Coordinates: 19°39′54″N 109°10′30″E
- Country: China
- Province: Hainan
- Administrative division: Danzhou

Area
  - Total: 3.81 km^{2} (1.47 sq mi)
- Time zone: UTC+8
  - Summer (DST): China Standard
- Area code: (0)898
- Website: hhd.evergrande.com (archived)

Ocean Flower Island (Chinese: 海花岛) is an artificial archipelago located off the northern coast of Danzhou, a city in Hainan, China. It was built by the Evergrande Group and consists of three islets with a total area of 381 hectares (940 acres).

== Geography ==
Ocean Flower Island is an artificial archipelago situated within Yangpu Bay in the Chinese province of Hainan, off the northern coast of Danzhou and to the west of the Yangpu Peninsula. It consists of three independent islets with a total area of 381 hectares (940 acres).

== History ==
The project was conceived by Xu Jiayin, the founder of Evergrande. Plans to create Ocean Flower Island were announced in 2015, and the project received an initial investment of CN¥160 billion (US$24 billion). Construction of the island and its buildings had mostly finished by the end of 2020, and the first trial runs for tours were held on 1 January 2021.

Zhang Qi, a provincial Communist Party official who was convicted of corruption in December 2020, had approved land reclamation projects to build the island, in violation of Hainan's environmental protection laws. The construction of the island damaged coral reefs and oyster populations. The boundaries of the protected area around the island were later restored.

Over 200,000 people visited the island to celebrate National Day on 1 October 2021.

In 2021, Ocean Flower Island was rated first in "Top 10 Ugliest Buildings in China". The reasons for its ranking are: reckless capital investment, destruction of the marine ecosystem, bizarre and chaotic forms, and its status as a typical example of ostentatious and vulgar cultural tourism projects.

On 30 December 2021, the city of Danzhou ordered the developer Evergrande, which was in the middle of a liquidity crisis, to demolish 39 of its buildings on the island. The buildings had been built illegally because they violated local planning laws; the company was given ten days to take the buildings down. The project's founder Xu Jiayin, who was once the richest man in China, has since been prosecuted for financial fraud and disorderly financial management.

In April 2022, the demolition order for 39 buildings was changed to confiscation by the city of Danzhou.

In 2024, residents of Haihua Island have reported that some newly built buildings have experienced issues such as cracked basement columns, crumbling cement, and severe corrosion of reinforcing steel, leading them to suspect that ocean sand was illegally used in the building construction.

== Gallery ==
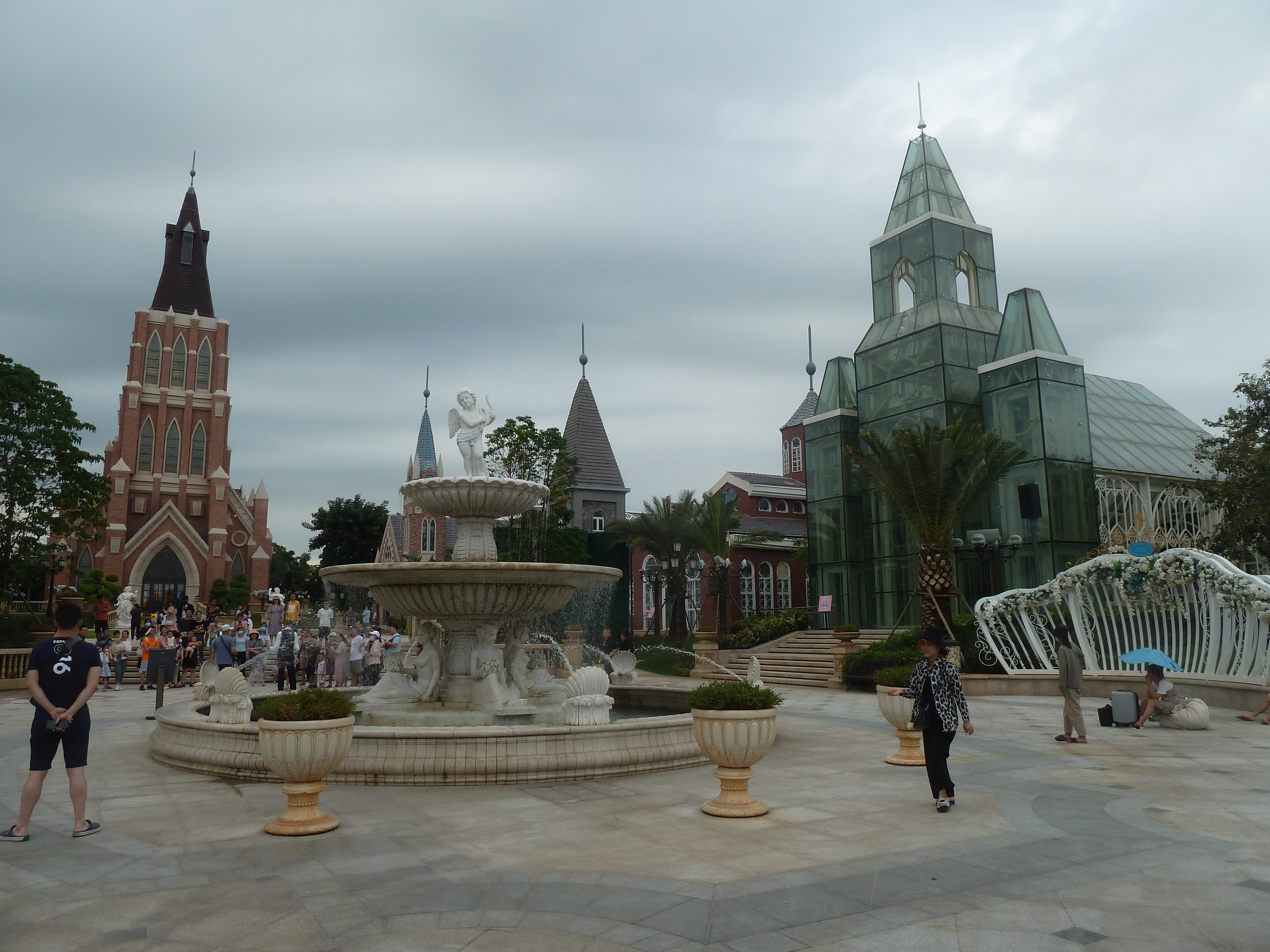

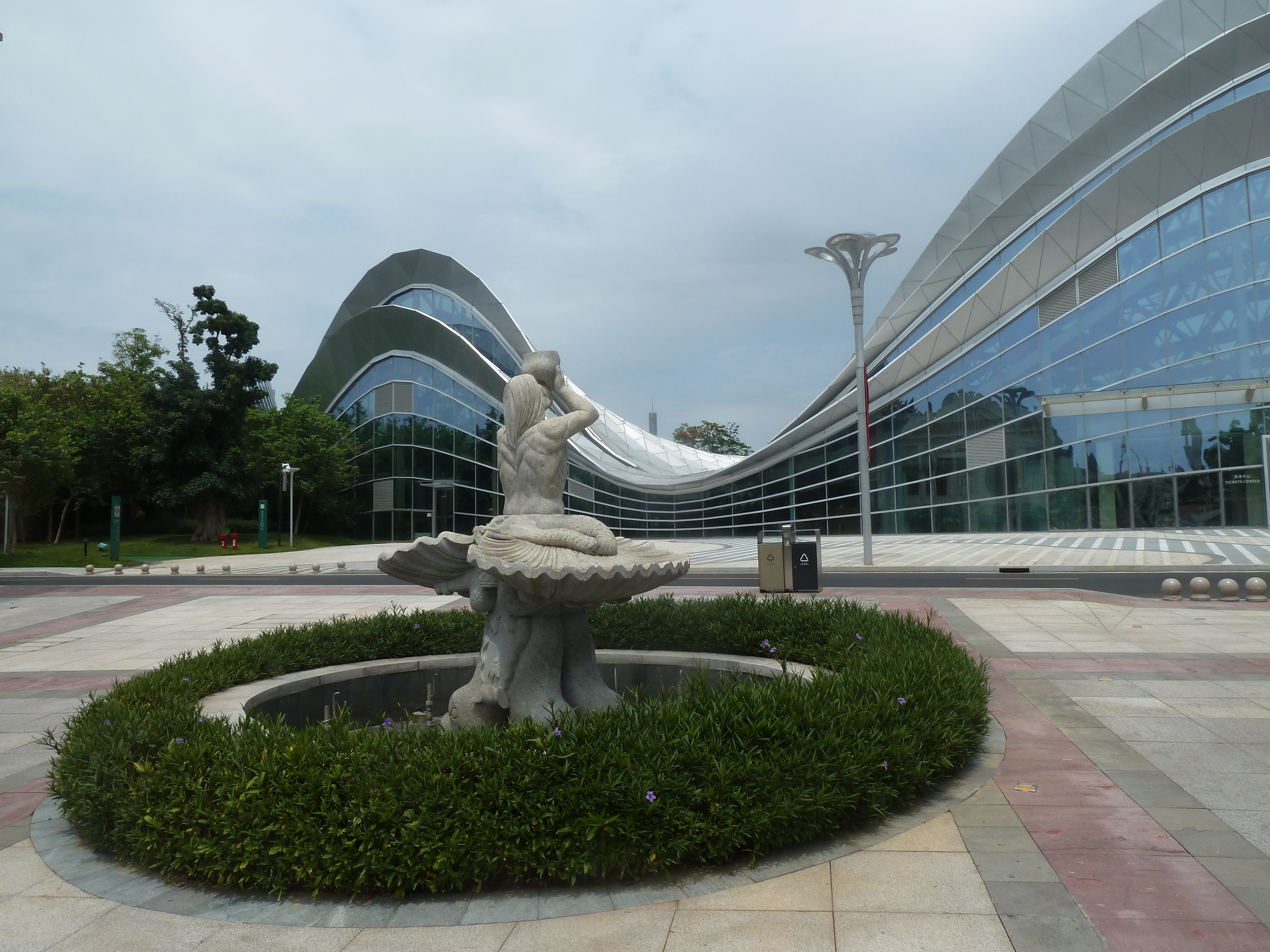

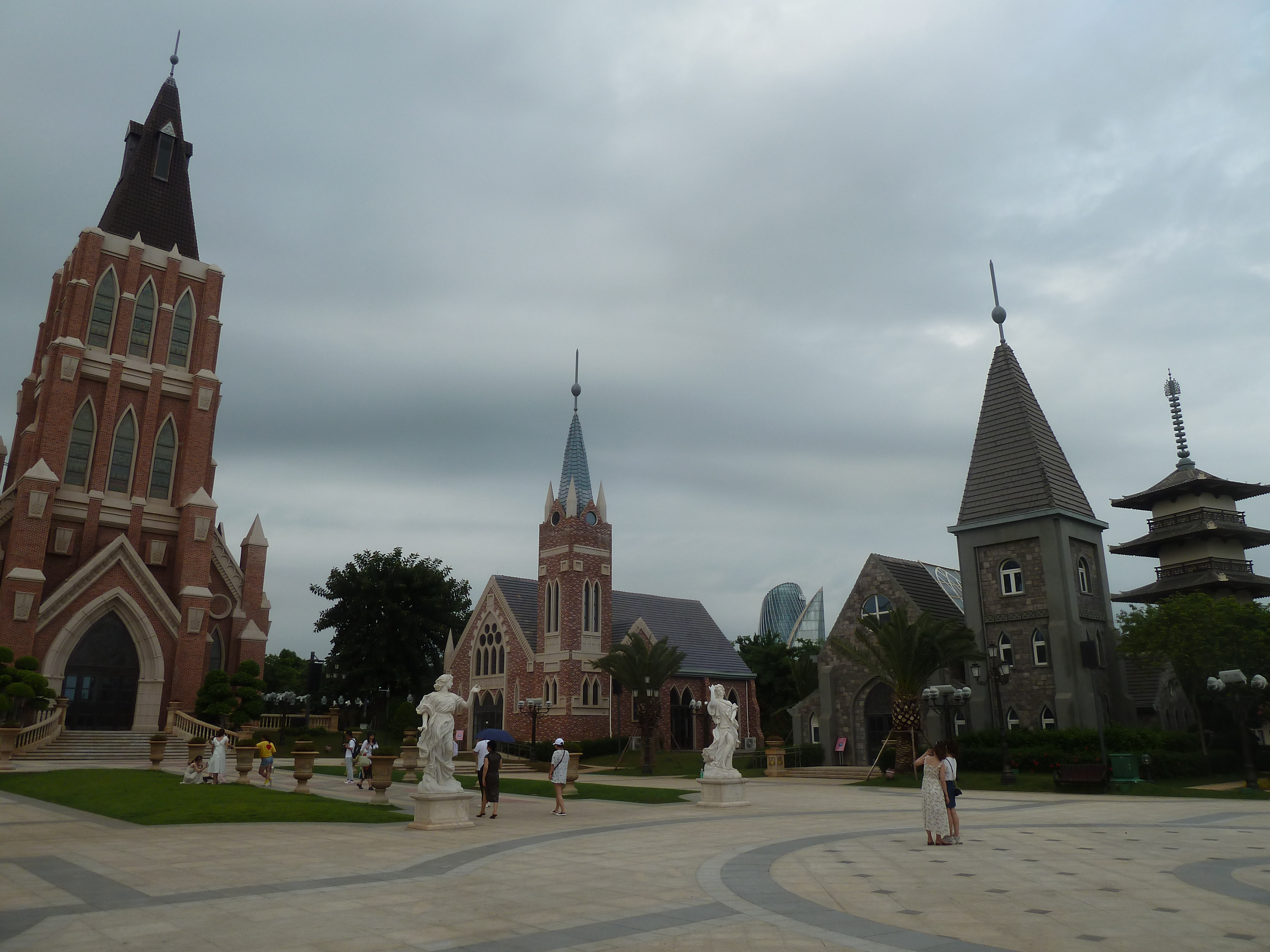

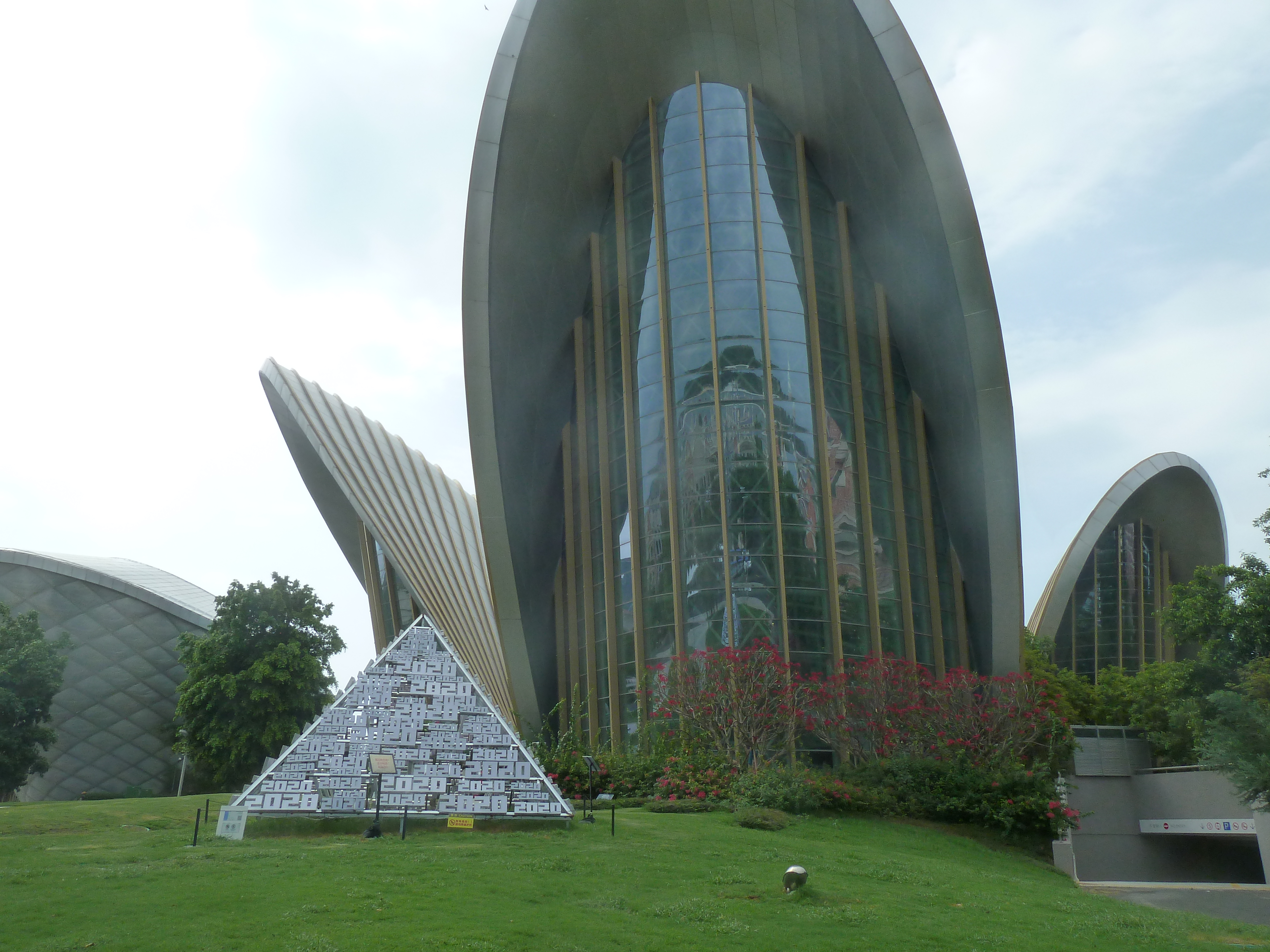

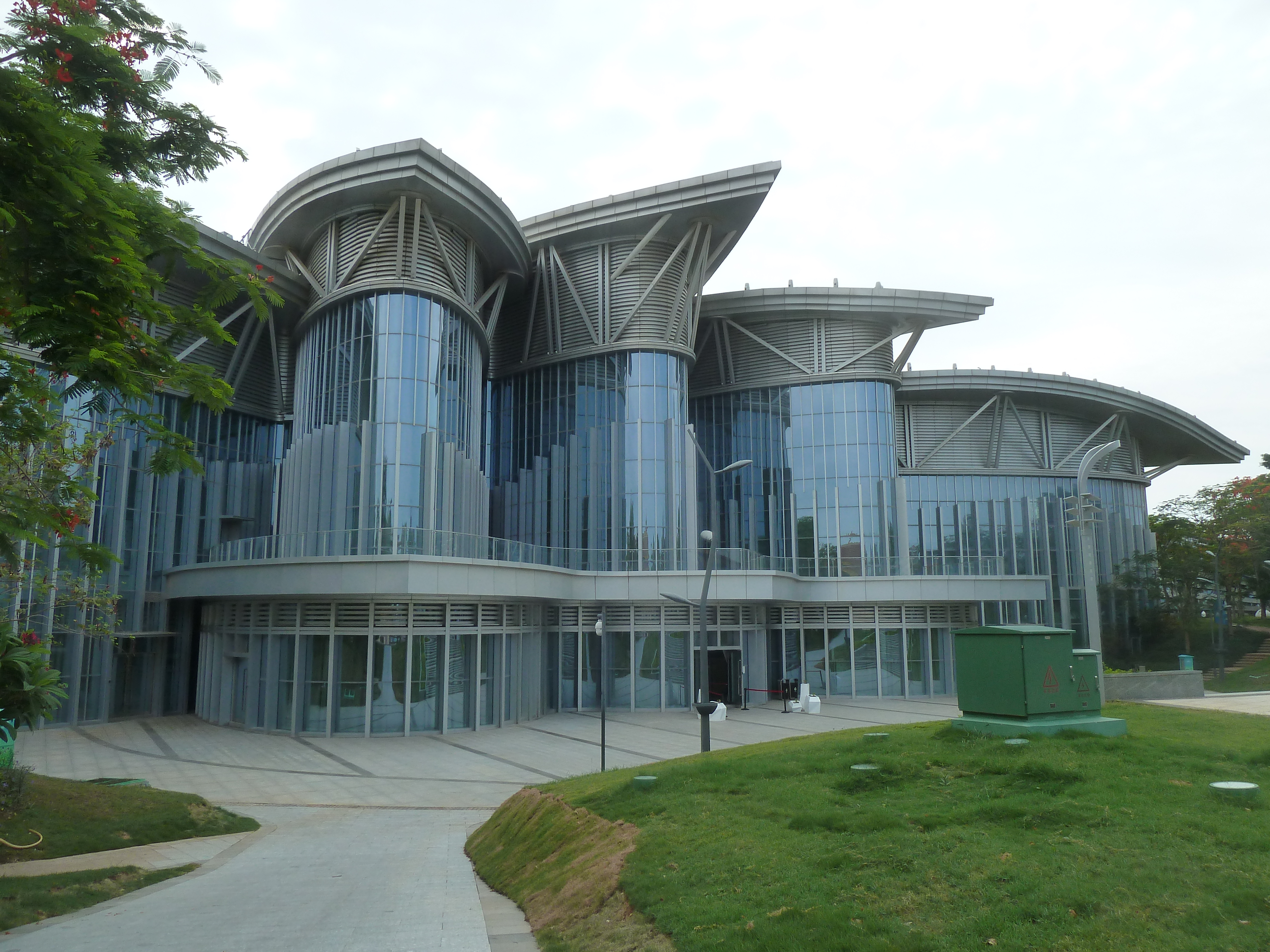

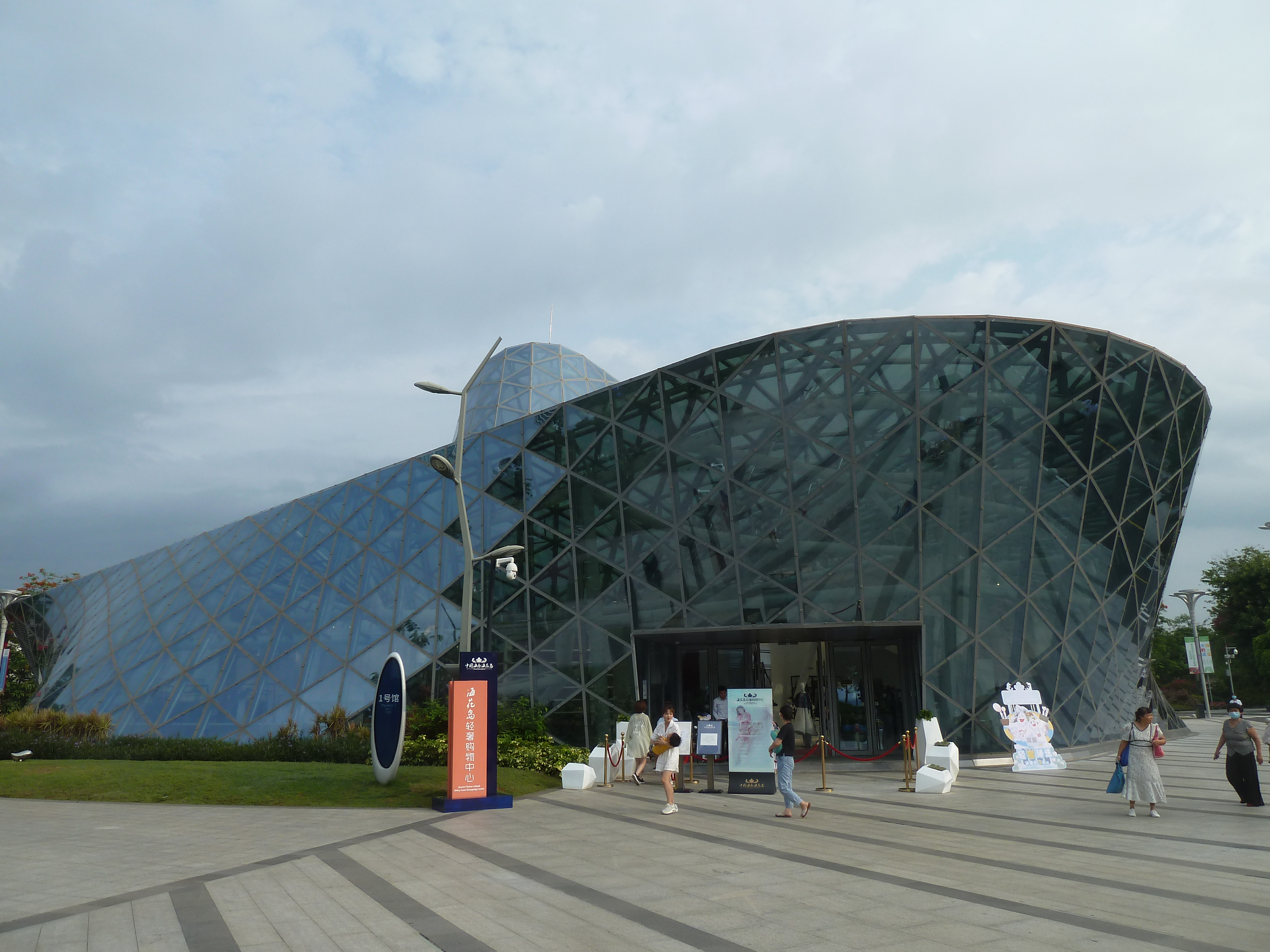

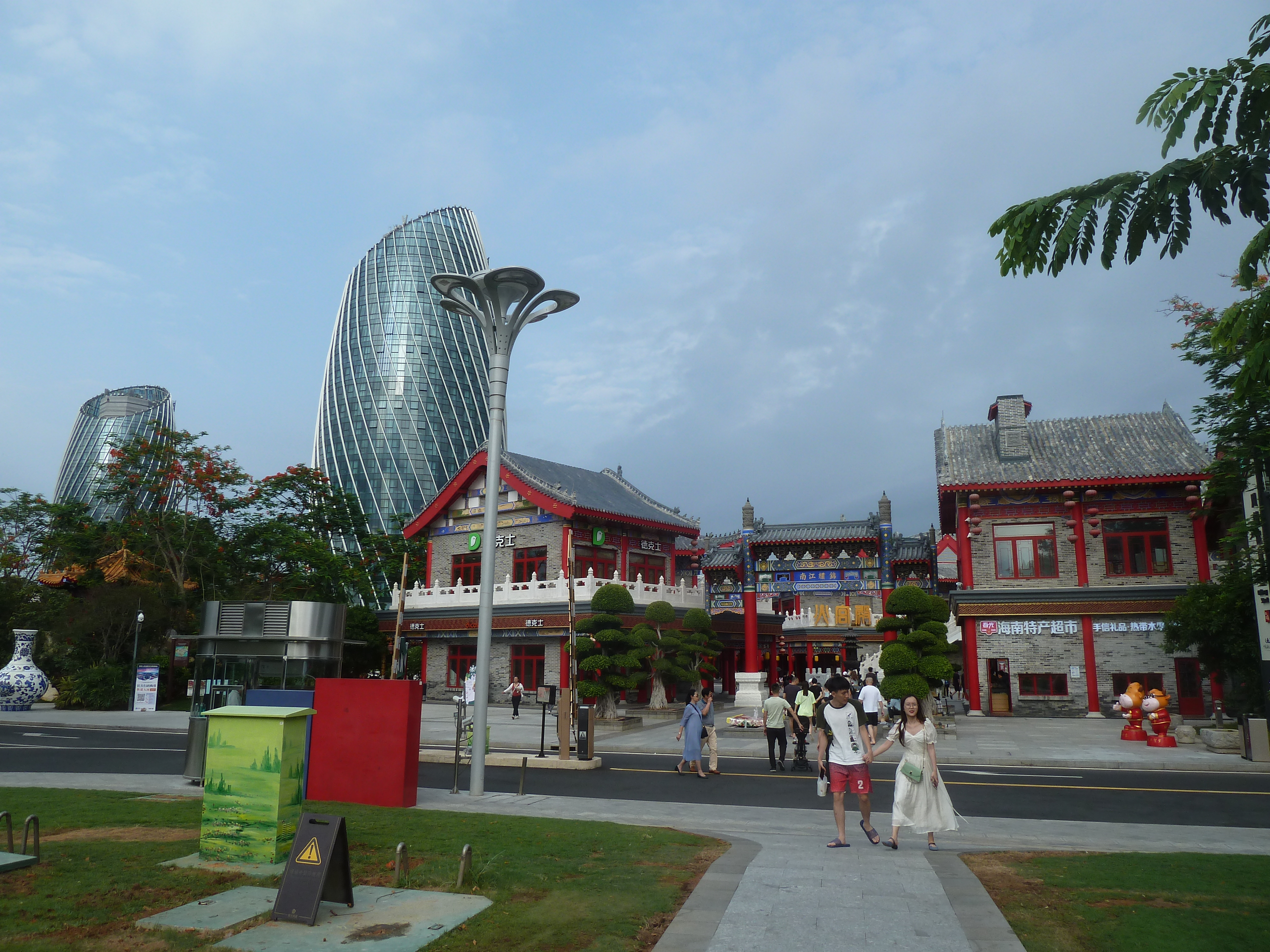

== See also ==
- List of islands of Hainan
- List of artificial islands
