= Sanya Bay =

Bay in Sanya, Hainan Province, China

- 三亚湾
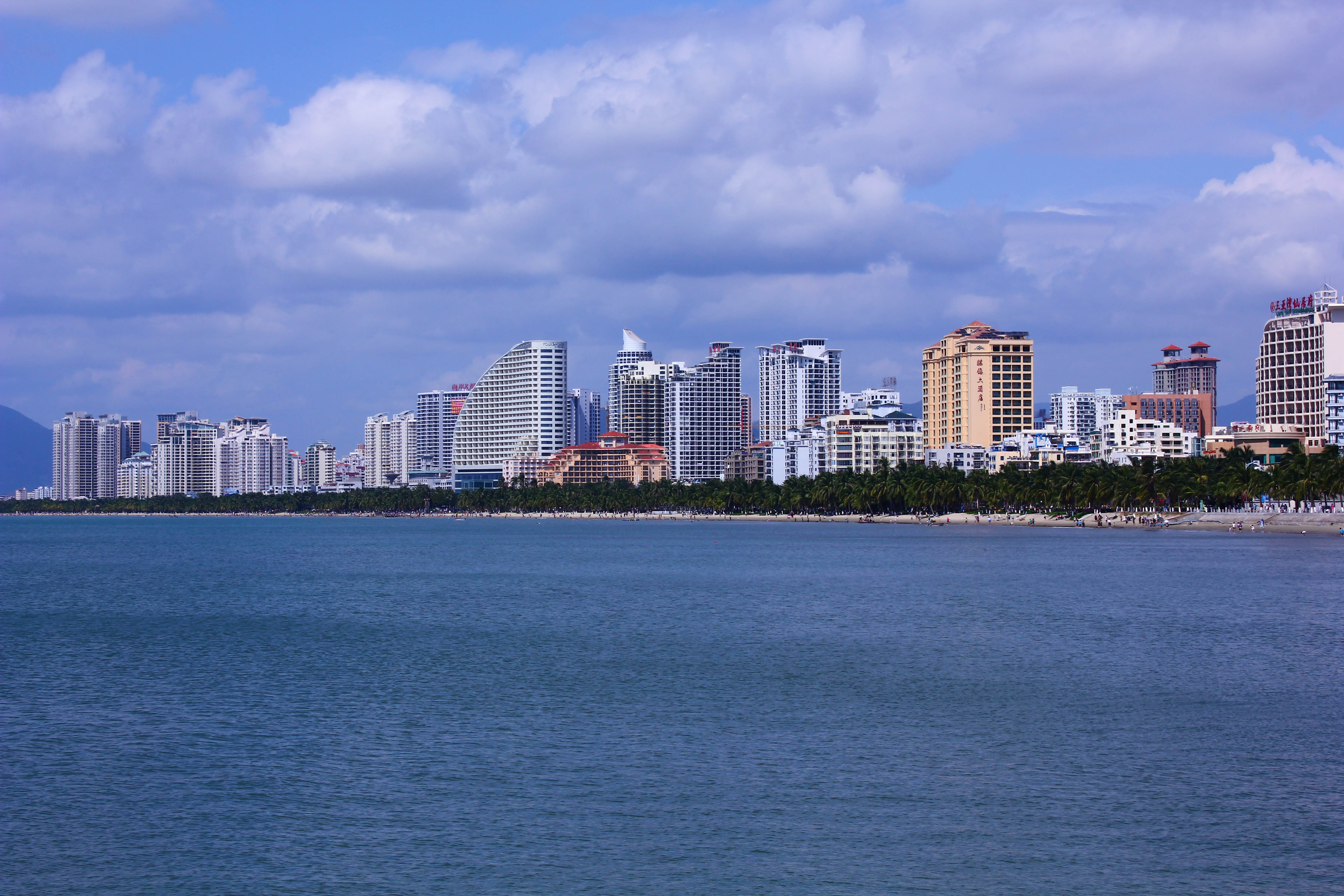
- Sanya Bay

- Location within Hainan
- Location: Hainan, China
- Coordinates: 18.258045°N 109.450092°E
- River sources: Sanya River
- Ocean/sea sources: South China Sea
- Frozen: no
- Islands: Phoenix Island
- Settlements: Sanya

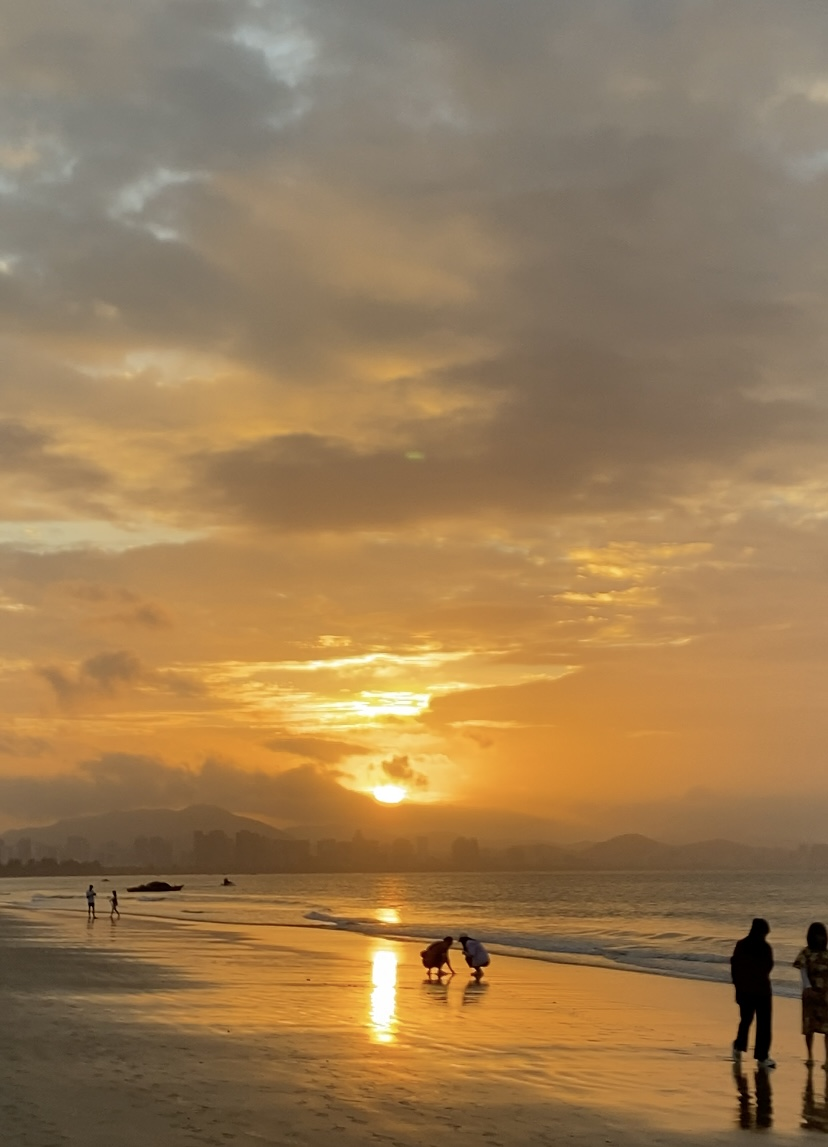
Sunrise in Sanya Bay

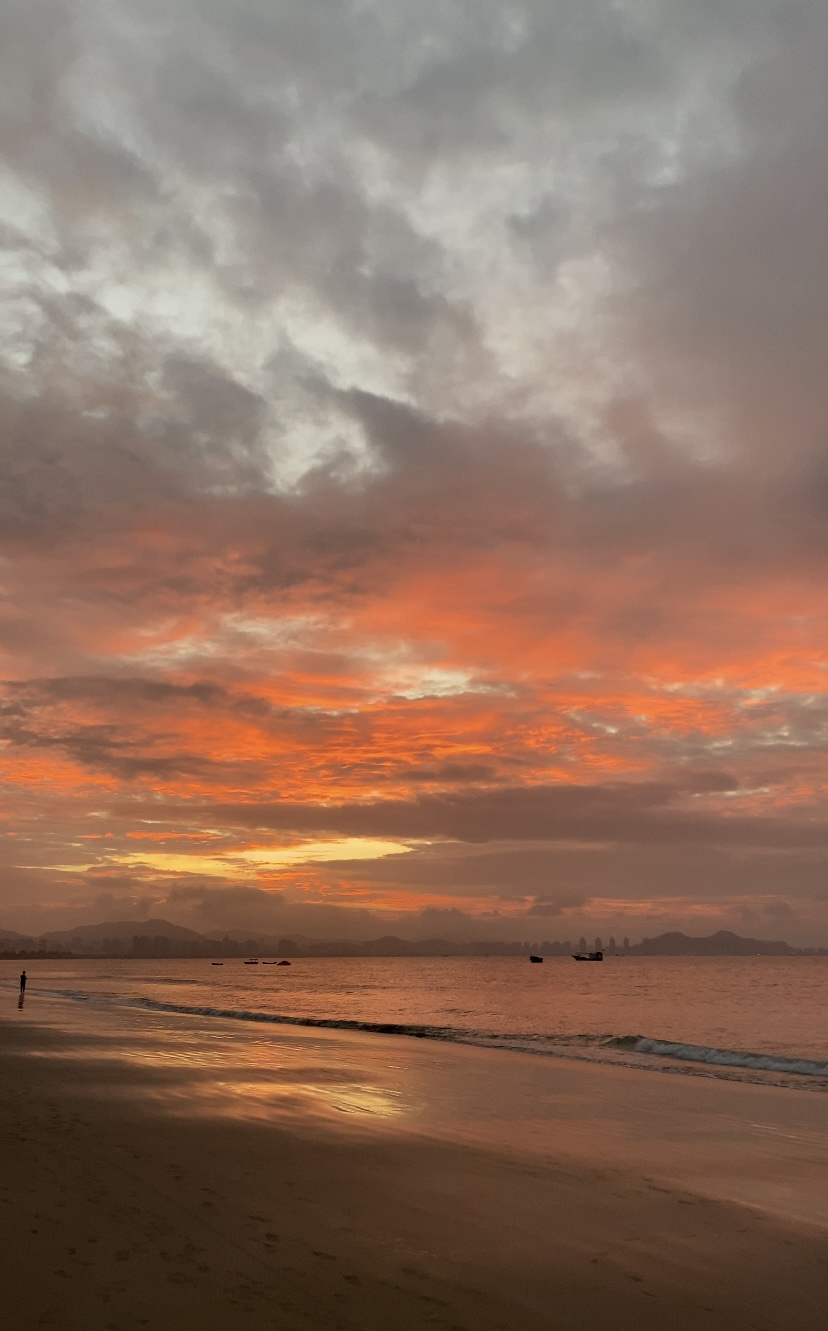
Sunrise in Sanya Bay

Sanya Bay (simplified Chinese: 三亚湾; traditional Chinese: 三亞灣; pinyin: Sānyà Wān) is one of the five major bays in Sanya City, Hainan Province, China. Located at the southern coast of Hainan, directly south of Sanya city, it has a 22 km beach. It is bordered by a peninsula at the east side. Within the bay are two islands called Xidao and Dongdao. The artificial resort Phoenix Island is located in the bay near the eastern end of the beach.

In recent years, as the waters of Sanya Bay and others below mentioned are becoming clearer and healthier, several species of dolphins including endangered Chinese white dolphins appear along the coasts from time to time, but as of 2017 they had not been considered as targeted tourism attractions.

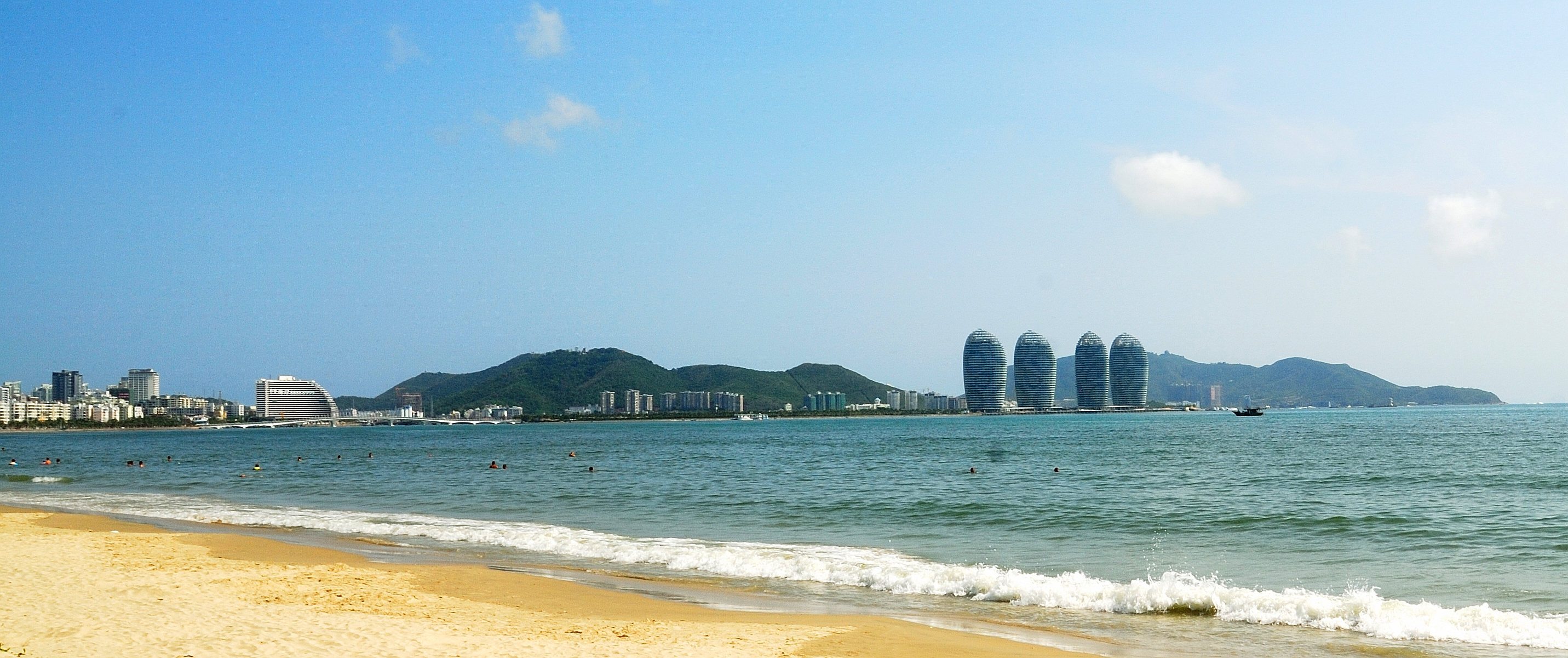
Phoenix Island of Sanya Bay

== Panoramic image ==
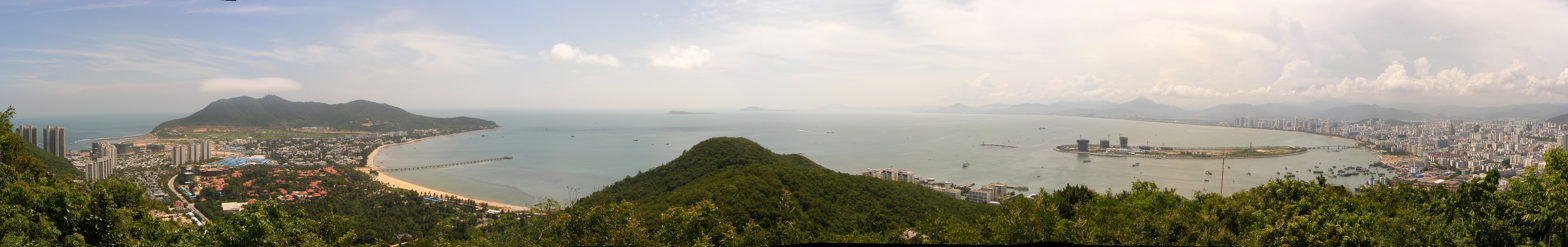

== See also ==
- Yalong Bay
