= Wuzhizhou Island =

Island in Hainan, China

Coordinates: 18.311521°N 109.761829°E

Native name: 蜈支洲岛
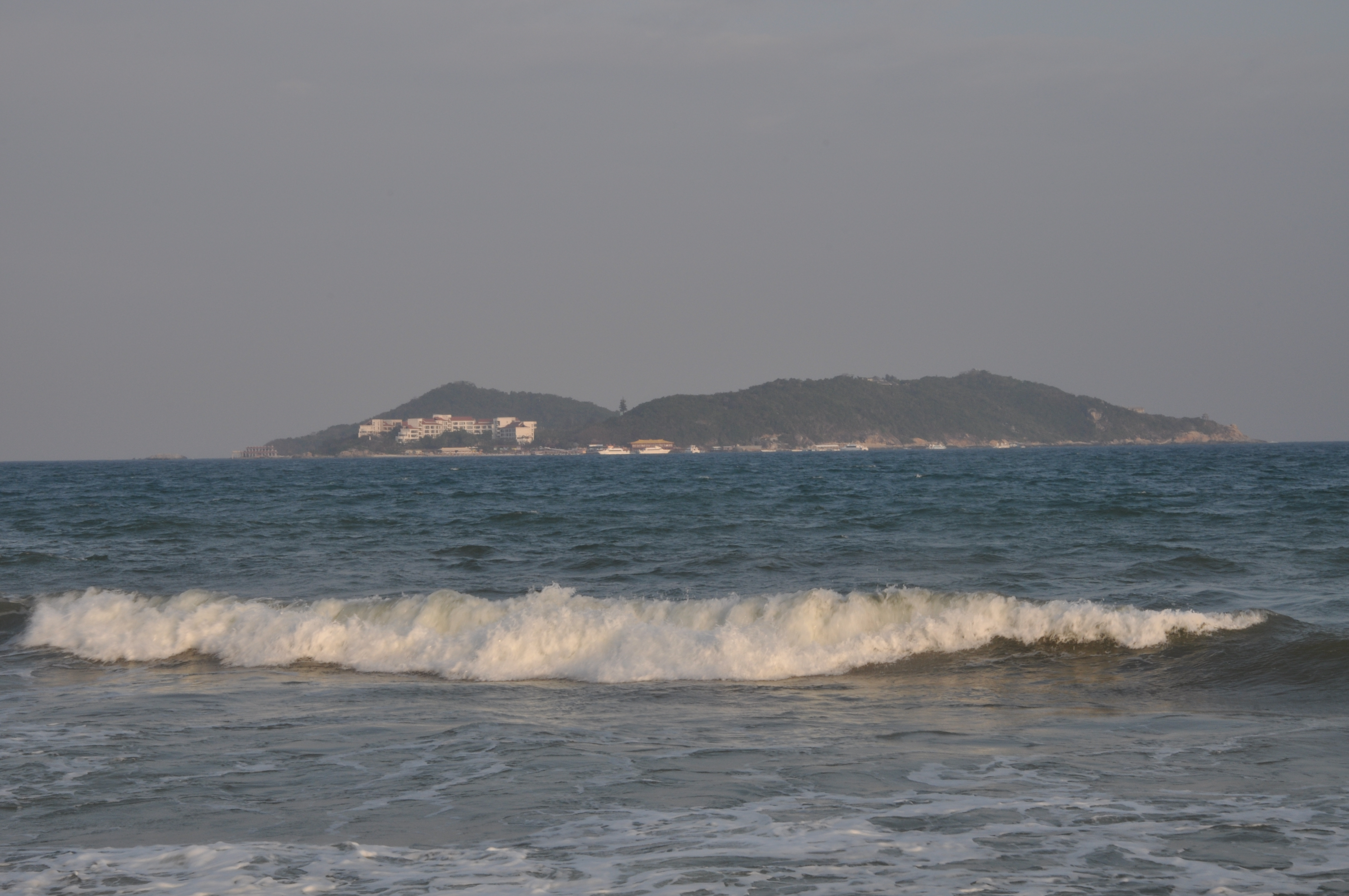
- Wuzhizhou Island viewed from Haitang Bay
- Interactive map of Wuzhizhou Island

Administration
- China
- Province: Hainan

Wuzhizhou Island (Chinese: 蜈支洲岛; pinyin: Wúzhīzhōu dǎo) is located off the coast of Hainan Province, China. This 1.48 square kilometre island is situated within Haitang Bay, approximately 30 kilometres northeast of Sanya, between Nanwan Monkey Island to the north, and Yalong Bay to the south.

== History ==
The Taoist priest Wu Huacun of the Qing dynasty built a house on the island after arriving in search of a place to create the "elixir of life".

== Geography ==
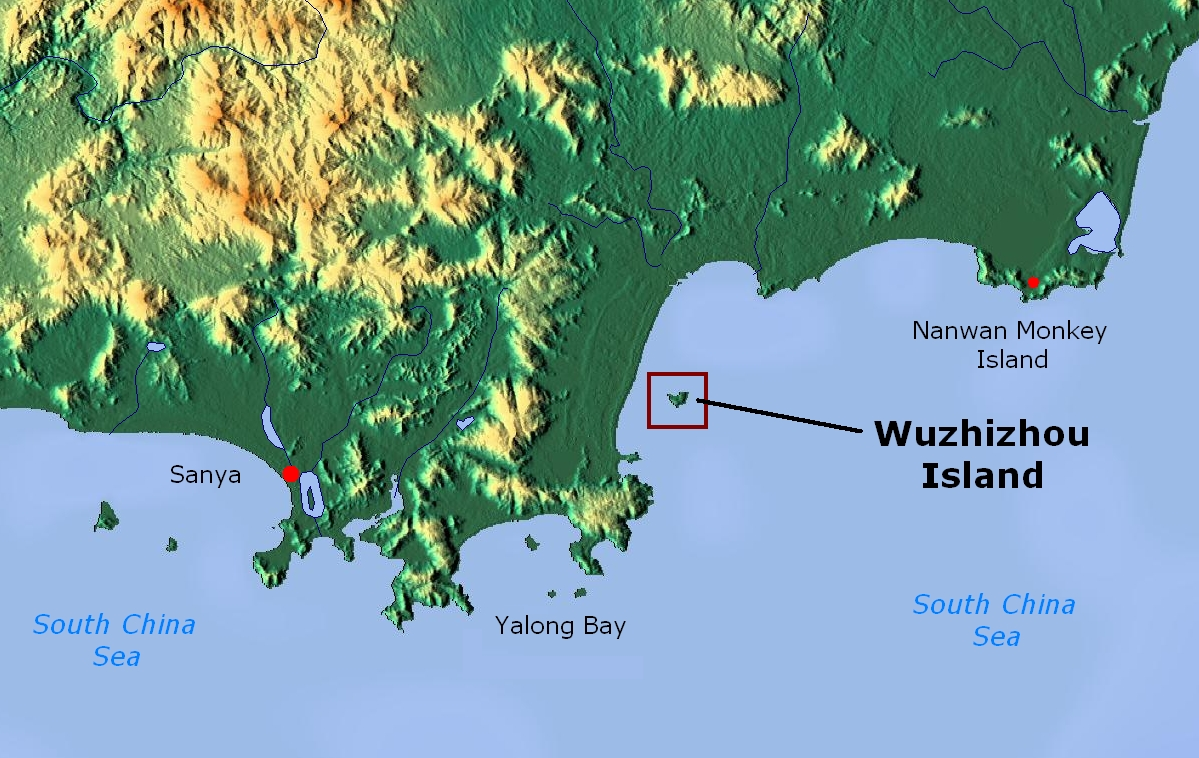

The island is 1.48 square kilometres with 5.7 kilometres of coastline, and has an irregular butterfly shape or heart shape, hence called "Lover's Island".

== Flora and fauna ==
Over 2,700 plant varieties occur on the island, including exotic flowers and trees such as Alsophila spinulosa and Dracaena draco, thought to be the oldest plant species in the world.

The waters surrounding the island contain numerous species such as sea cucumbers, urchins, and tropical fish.

== Tropical sea ranch ==
In May 2011, a construction project began to create a marine ecology area. The "sea ranch" planned 18,000 cubic meters of artificial reefs over an area of approximately 66.6 hectares. This aquaculture project is funded by a private investment of about US$3 million.

As of September 2020, there is now a National Marine Ranch Demonstration Zone and 6 of the planned marine ranches are under construction with additional funding in alignment with the overall plan for the construction of Hainan Free Trade Port, more ranches will follow to promote tourism as well as the recovery of the marine ecology.

The following named ranches are under construction:

- Haikou East Coast Marine Ranch
- Lingaotou Yangwan Marine Ranch
- Wenchang Fengjiawan Marine Ranch
- Danzhou Eman Marine Ranch
- Wanning Chauzi Island Marine Ranch
- Sanya Yazhou Bay Ocean Ranch
