= Ruyi Island =

Artificial island in Hainan, China

Coordinates: 20.09202°N 110.40678°E

Native name: 如意岛
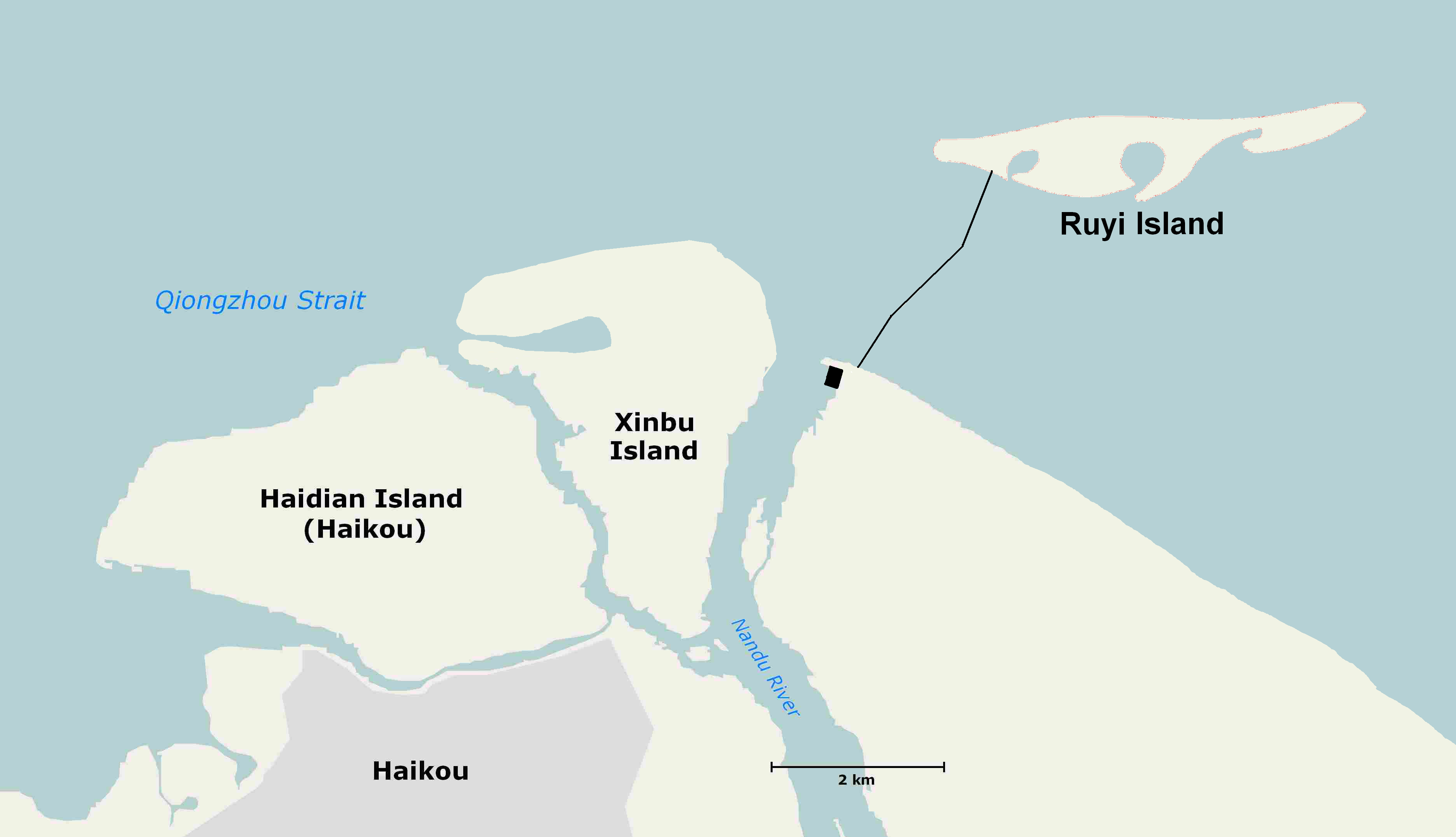

- Location within Hainan

Geography

Administration
- China
- Province: Hainan
- Prefecture-level city: Haikou

Ruyi Island (Chinese: 如意岛) is an under-construction artificial island approximately 3 kilometres (1.9 mi) northeast of Haidian Island, Haikou, Hainan, China.

== The island ==
The island will be approximately 5 kilometres (3.1 mi) long and 1 kilometre (0.62 mi) wide.

== The bridge ==
The Ruyi Island Bridge connecting the island to the Hainan mainland will be 5.666 km long and 27.5 metres wide. The bridge will have a road and tramway, and will also be used to bring water, electricity, natural gas, and fiber optical cable to the island. It is expected to be completed around June 2019.

== The staging port ==
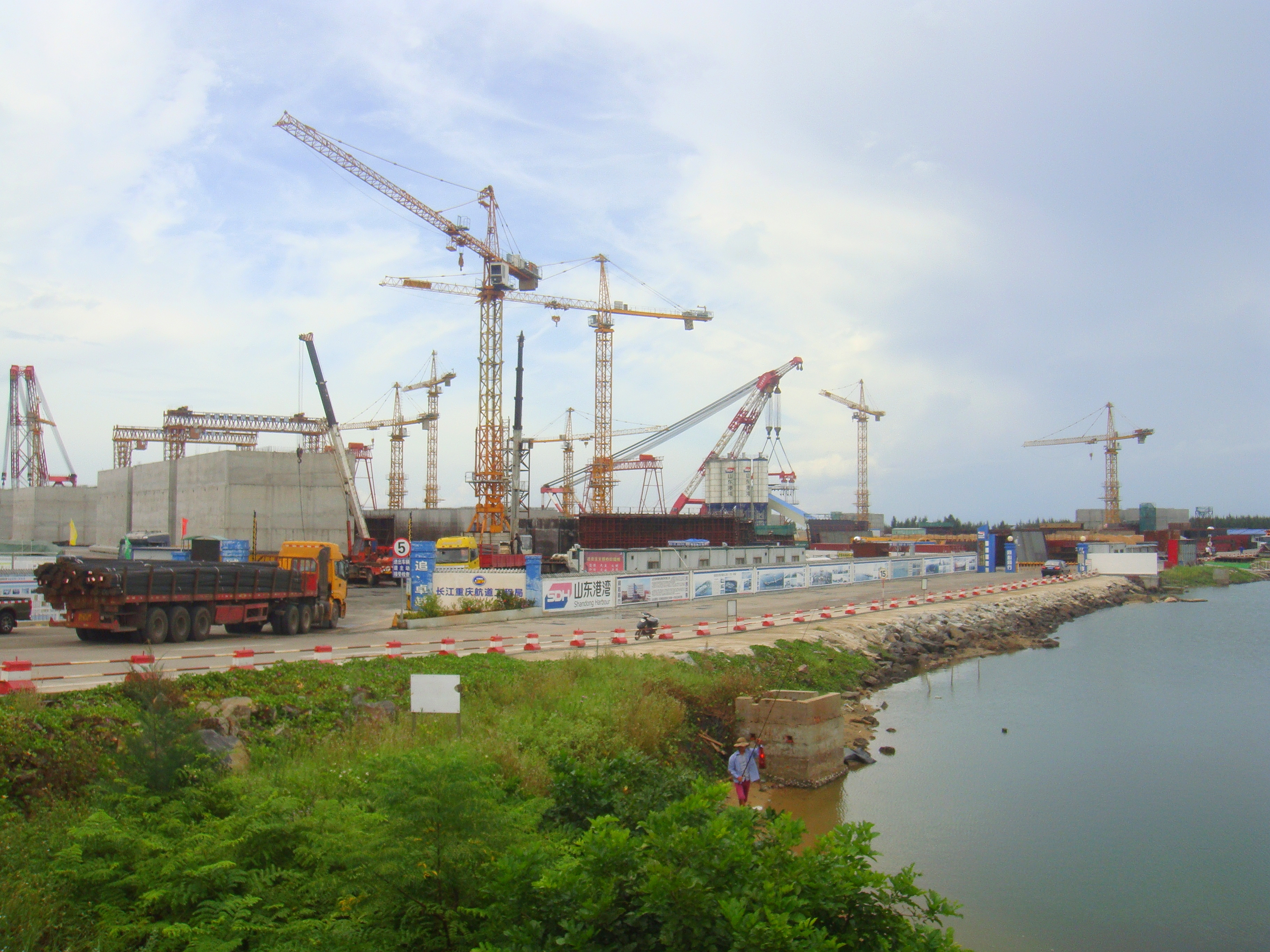

On Hainan's mainland, on the east side of the mouth of the Nandu River, a port has been built to store caissons for the bridge. Barges then transport and place the caissons.

By the beginning of May, 2017, of the 553 caissons required, 460 had been prefabricated and 400 had been installed. The caissons weigh between 500 and 1,700 tons each.

== See also ==
- List of islands of Hainan
