= Haikou Bay =

Bay in Hainan, China

Haikou Bay 海口湾
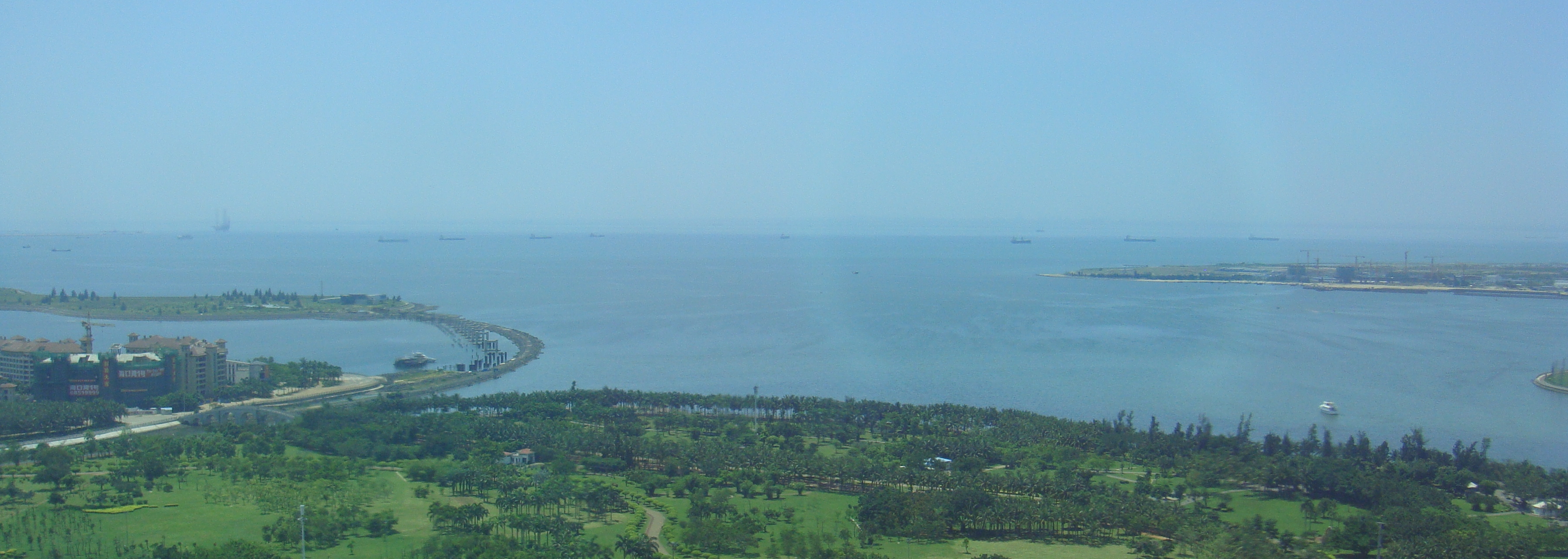

- Location within Hainan
- Location: Hainan Province, China
- Coordinates: 20°03′N 110°16′E
- River sources: Haidian River
- Ocean/sea sources: Qiongzhou Strait
- Max. width: 12 km (7.5 mi)
- Frozen: no
- Settlements: Haikou

Haikou Bay is a bay on the northern coast of Hainan Province, China, in the Qiongzhou Strait. It is named for Haikou City, which is situated on the coast.

This shallow bay spans approximately 12 km from its eastern boundary at the northwestern tip of Haidian Island to its western boundary roughly at Hainan International Convention And Exhibition Center.

== Features ==
Within the bay are the following from west to east:

- Holiday Beach
- Nanhai Pearl Artificial Island, an under-construction island owned by HNA Group off the coast of Holiday Beach
- Haikou Xiuying Port
- The northern edge of Haikou City
- Evergreen Park, a large park on the coast
- Mayard International Yacht Club
- The mouth of the Haidian River

== Land reclamation ==
Part of the western edge of Haidian Island is being extended in a major land reclamation project. Also, several new areas of land off the coast of Haikou are being created, including the Nanhai Pearl Artificial Island.
