= Holiday Beach (Haikou) =

Beach in Haikou, Hainan, China

Coordinates: 20°04′45″N 110°23′21″E

Holiday Beach (Chinese: 假日海滩) (officially Holiday Beachside Resort) is beach and visitor attraction located along Binhai Road, Haikou, Hainan, China.

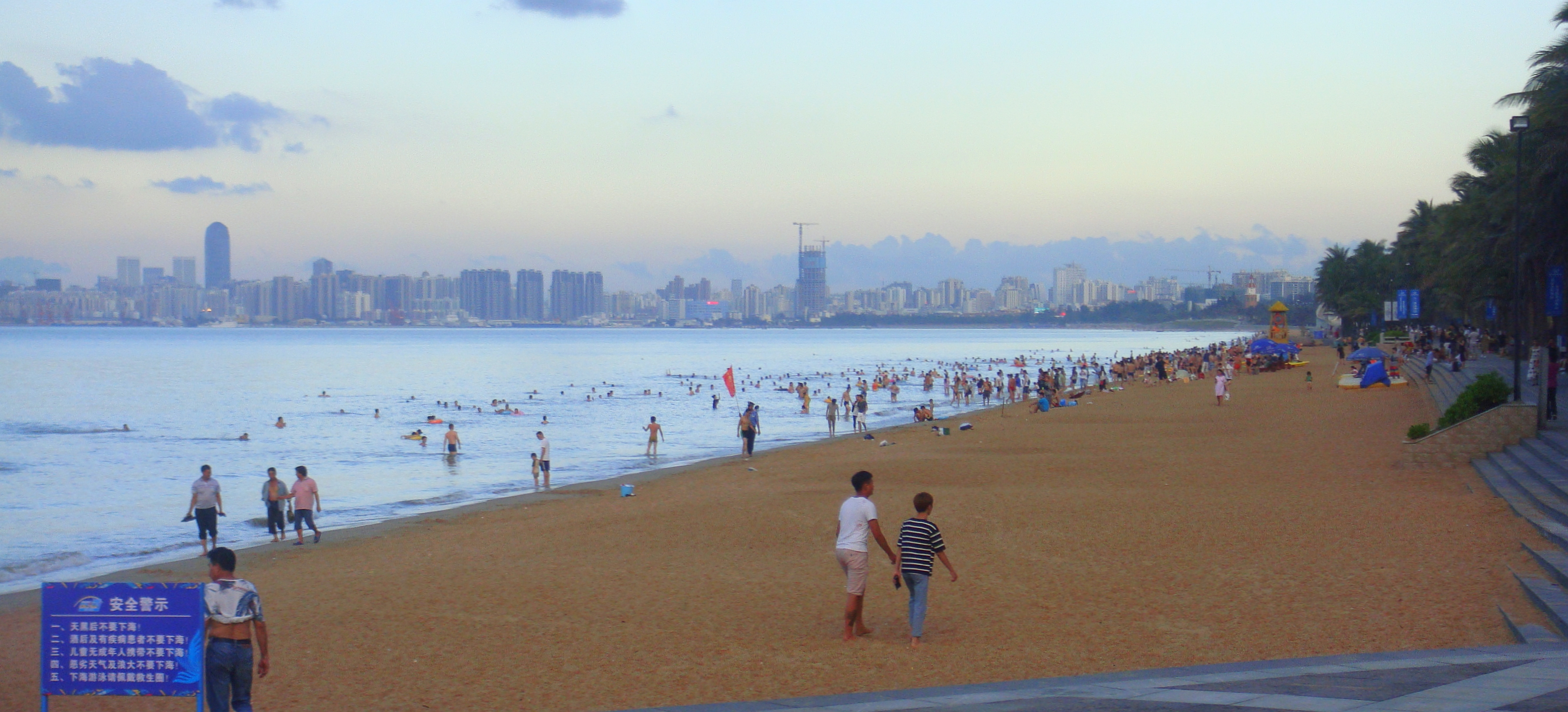
Holiday Beach looking east

The 7-kilometre-long, 33 hectare beach area was officially established in 1995. It is essentially an extension of Xixiu Park, which is directly to the east of Holiday Beach. Since then, it has undergone development with the establishment of visitor attractions such as restaurants, swimming pools, and an amphitheatre.

The land beside the beach has been landscaped and pathways created. The entire shoreline is maintained by workers who remove rubbish.

The beach itself is roughly twenty metres from seawall to waterline, and is visited by tourists and locals alike. The waters are used by swimmers, sailboaters, windsurfers, and occasionally kitesurfers. The beach has also been the site of major competitions for such sports as kitesurfing and volleyball.

== Shaokao area ==
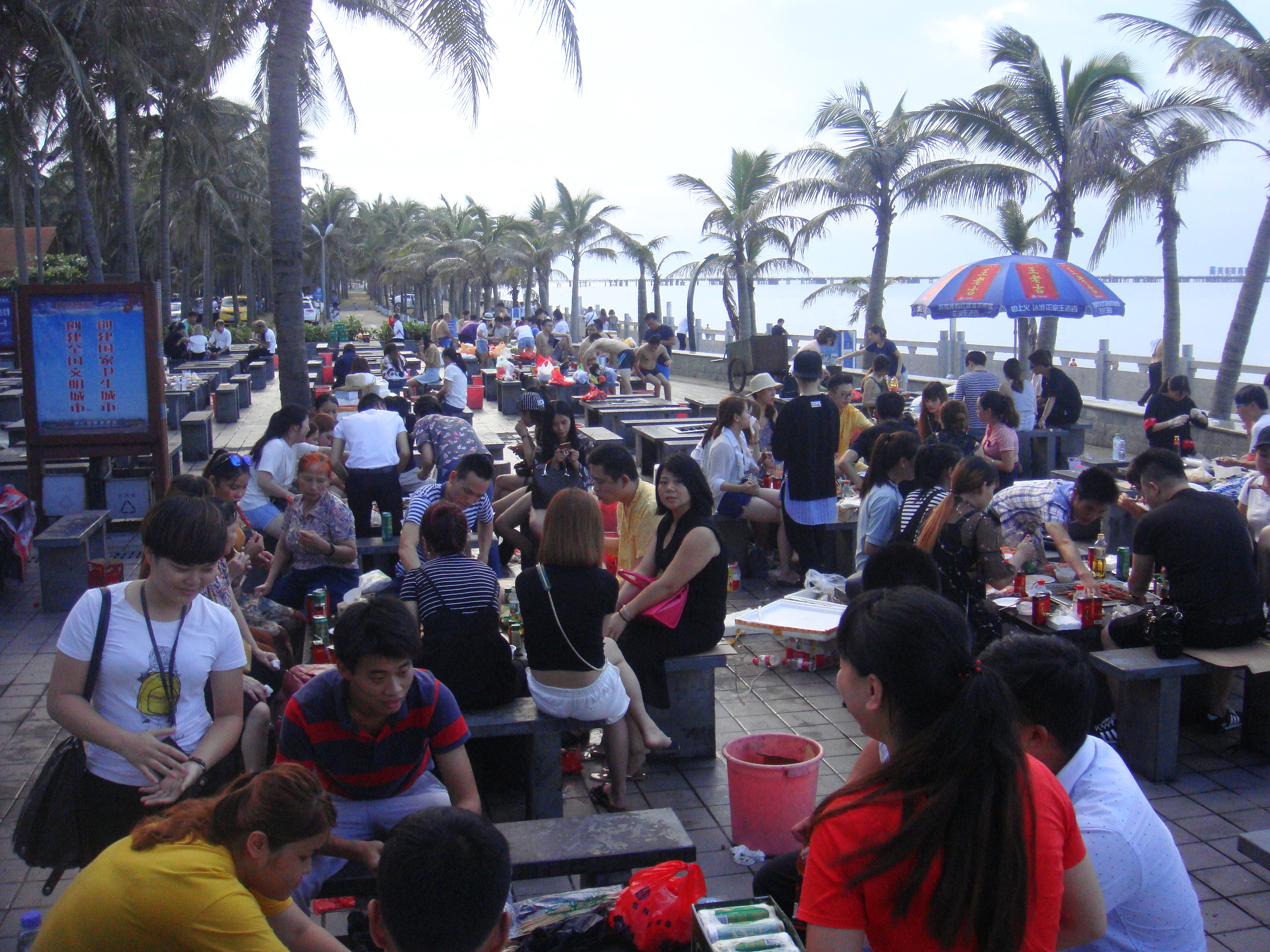
Shaokao area

The shaokao area consists of several hundred stone tables and benches, each with a barbecue area in the centre. Patrons pay 180 RMB to use the table, which includes 6 kg of charcoal. Groups bring their own food, typically chuanr and soft drinks or beer. It is well-known and popular among residents of Haikou, in particular, young people. Each evening crowds arrive, and on weekends, this area is commonly filled to capacity.

== 2015 typhoon damage ==
The beach suffered damage from Typhoon Rammasun in 2014. Around May 2015, coastal reinforcements are being installed. By 2017 the reinforcements were completed and no damage from the typhoon remained.
