= Longhu =

Longhu may refer to the following locations in China:

- Mount Longhu (龙虎山), in Jiangxi
- Longhu District (龙湖区), Shantou, Guangdong

== Towns (龙湖镇) ==
- Longhu, Fujian, in Jinjiang
- Longhu, Chao'an County, Guangdong
- Longhu, Wuzhou, in Dieshan District, Wuzhou, Guangxi
- Longhu, Hainan, in Ding'an County
- Longhu, Henan, in Xinzheng
- Longhu, Jiangxi, in Nancheng County

== Townships ==
- Longhu Township, Guangxi (龙虎乡), in Gongcheng Yao Autonomous County
- Longhu Township, Hebei (龙虎乡), in She County
