= Wuzhou Changzhoudao Airport =

Wuzhou Changzhoudao Airport 梧州长洲岛机场
- IATA: WUZ; ICAO: ZGWZ

Summary
- Airport type: Public
- Serves: Wuzhou, Guangxi
- Location: Changzhou District, Wuzhou
- Closed: January 2019
- Coordinates: 23°27′24″N 111°14′53″E

Map
- Location of airport in Guangxi

Runways
Direction	Length		Surface
Direction	m	ft	Surface
18/36	1,800	5,906	Concrete

Wuzhou Changzhoudao Airport
- Simplified Chinese: 梧州长洲岛机场
- Traditional Chinese: 梧州長洲島機場
Transcriptions
Standard Mandarin
- Hanyu Pinyin: Wúzhōu Chángzhōudǎo Jīchǎng

Wuzhou Changzhoudao Airport (Chinese: 梧州长洲岛机场) (IATA: WUZ, ICAO: ZGWZ) was an airport serving the city of Wuzhou in Guangxi Zhuang Autonomous Region, China. On 23 January 2019, the new Wuzhou Xijiang Airport was opened on to replace Changzhoudao Airport.

== See also ==
- List of airports in China
- List of the busiest airports in China
