= Type 528 reconnaissance boat =

People's Liberation Army Navy vessel

Class overview
- Builders: Wuzhou Shipyard
- Operators: People's Liberation Army Navy

General characteristics
- Type: Patrol Boat
- Displacement: 11 tonnes (11 long tons; 12 short tons)
- Length: 13 m (42 ft 8 in)
- Beam: 2.91 m (9 ft 7 in)
- Installed power: Internal combustion engine
- Propulsion: Diesel engine
- Speed: 33 knots (61 km/h; 38 mph)
- Complement: 12
- Sensors & processing systems: 1 × navigational radar
- Armament: 2 x twin 25 mm (0.98 in) Type 61 guns; 12.7 mm (0.50 in) machine guns

Type 528 reconnaissance boat is a type of reconnaissance boat developed by China for the People's Liberation Army Navy (PLAN).

Built by Wuzhou shipyard, the predecessor of China Guijiang Shipbuilding Co., Ltd. (中船桂江造船有限公司) in the 1960s, Type 528 is also deployed as a patrol boat, though its primary mission was to deliver reconnaissance and special forces to their intended destinations.
