= Dinghai Bridge =

Dinghai Bridge 定海大桥
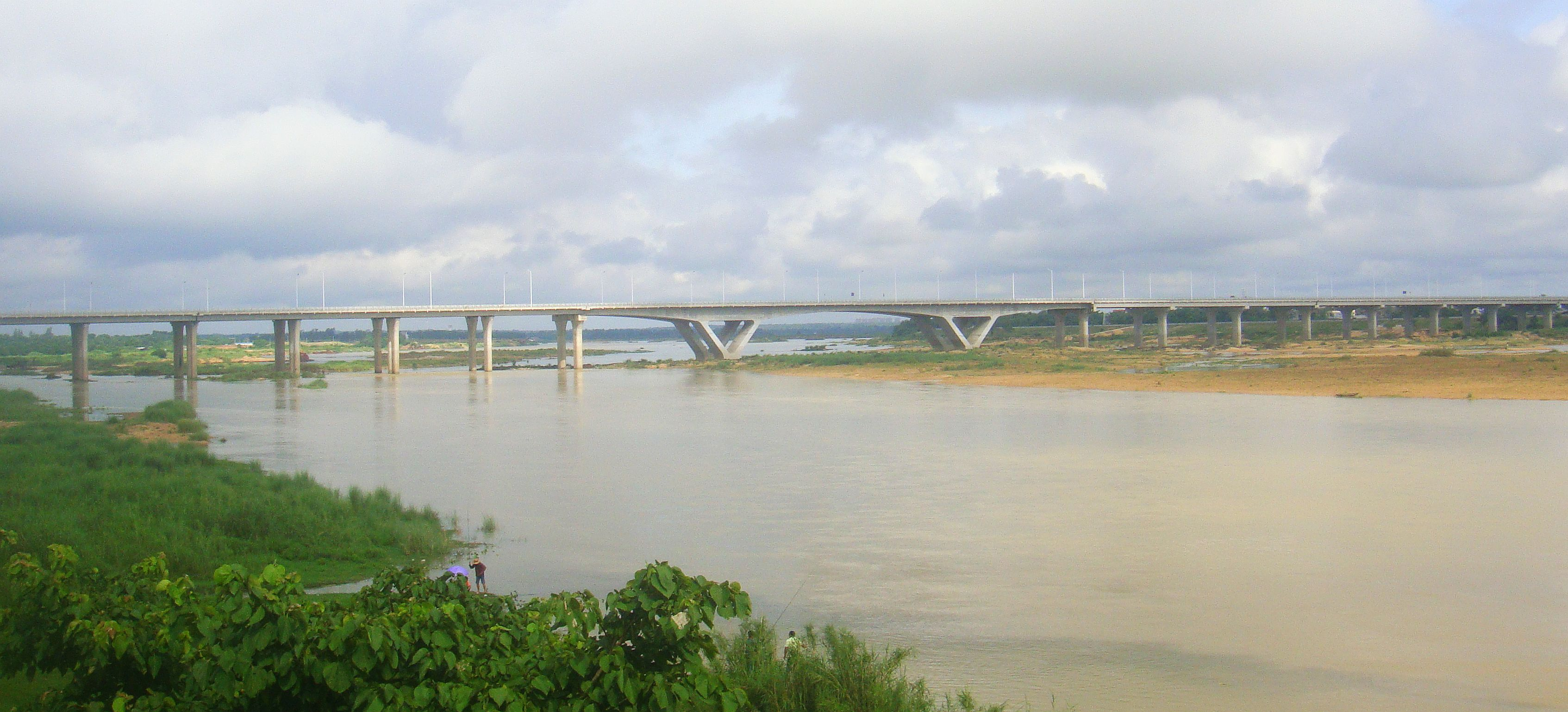
- Dinghai Bridge viewed from the north side of the Nandu River, east of the bridge
- Coordinates: 19°41′56″N 110°18′22″E
- Crosses: Nandu River

Characteristics
- Design: Arch bridge
- Total length: 1,106 metres

History
- Construction cost: 460,000,000 RMB
- Opened: November 2016

Location
- Interactive map of Dinghai Bridge

Dinghai Bridge (in Chinese 定海大桥, and formerly 定马大桥) is an arch bridge over the Nandu River. The bridge connects Ding'an County on the south side of the Nandu, and Dongshan town in Xiuying District on the north. The bridge is located around 1 km west of Dingcheng and is the main access to that town from the north side of the Nandu. Dingcheng is located on the south side of the Nandu and is the main city in the county.

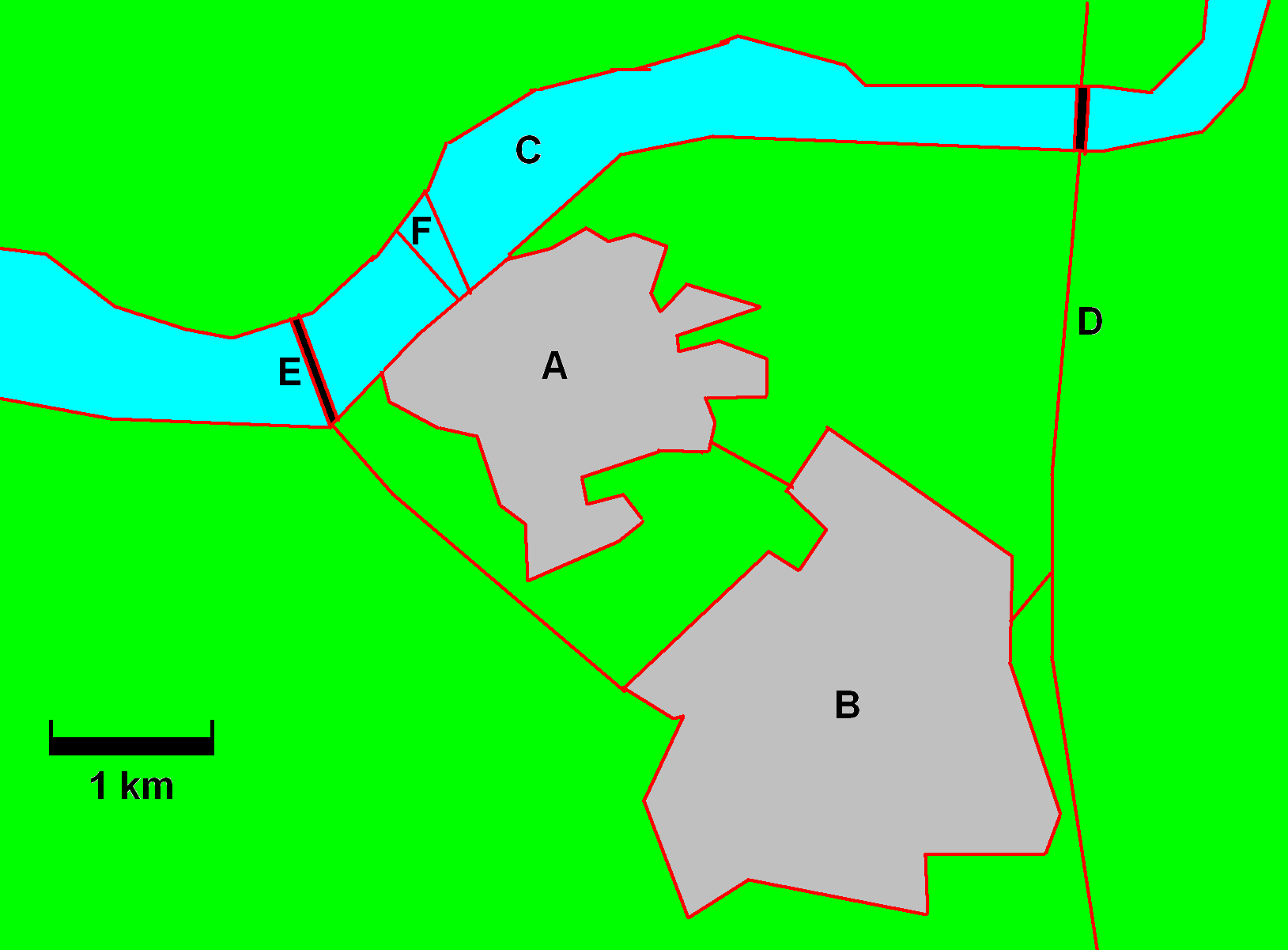
A: Laocheng (the old part of Dingcheng; B: Taling (the new part of Dingcheng); C: Nandu River; D: G98 Hainan Ring Expressway; E: Dinghai Bridge; F: Two wooden bridges

Prior to 2017, there were two, makeshift wooden bridges connecting the north bank of the Nandu with the north of "Laocheng", the old part of Dingcheng. The new Dinghai Bridge replaces them and they are now closed. At the north end of the bridge, a road will eventually be built that will lead all the way north to Haikou.

The bridge is 1,106 metres long and was expected to cost around 460,000,000 RMB.

The bridge was opened in November 2016 and its connecting line to G224 was opened in April 2019.

== Gallery ==
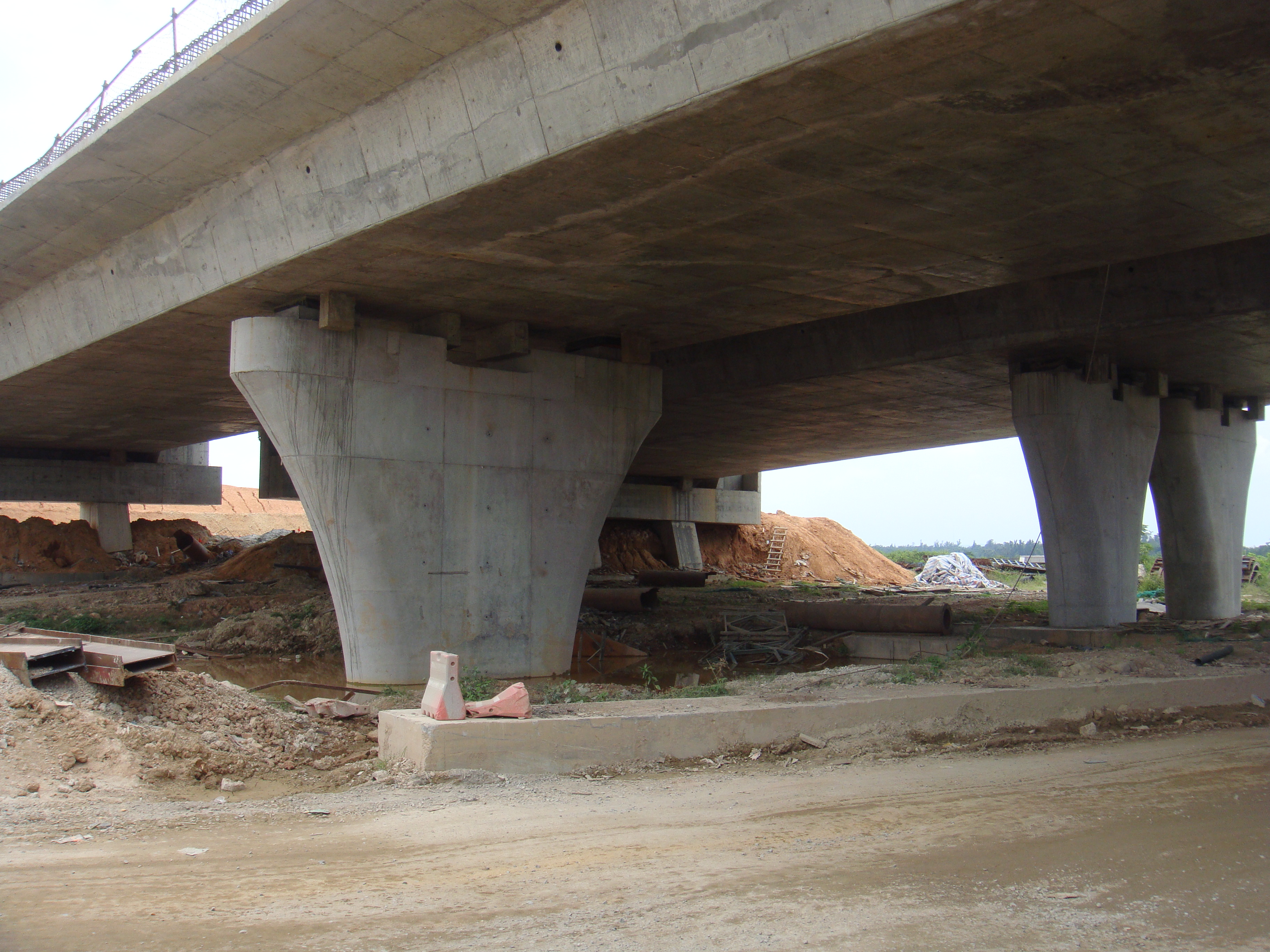

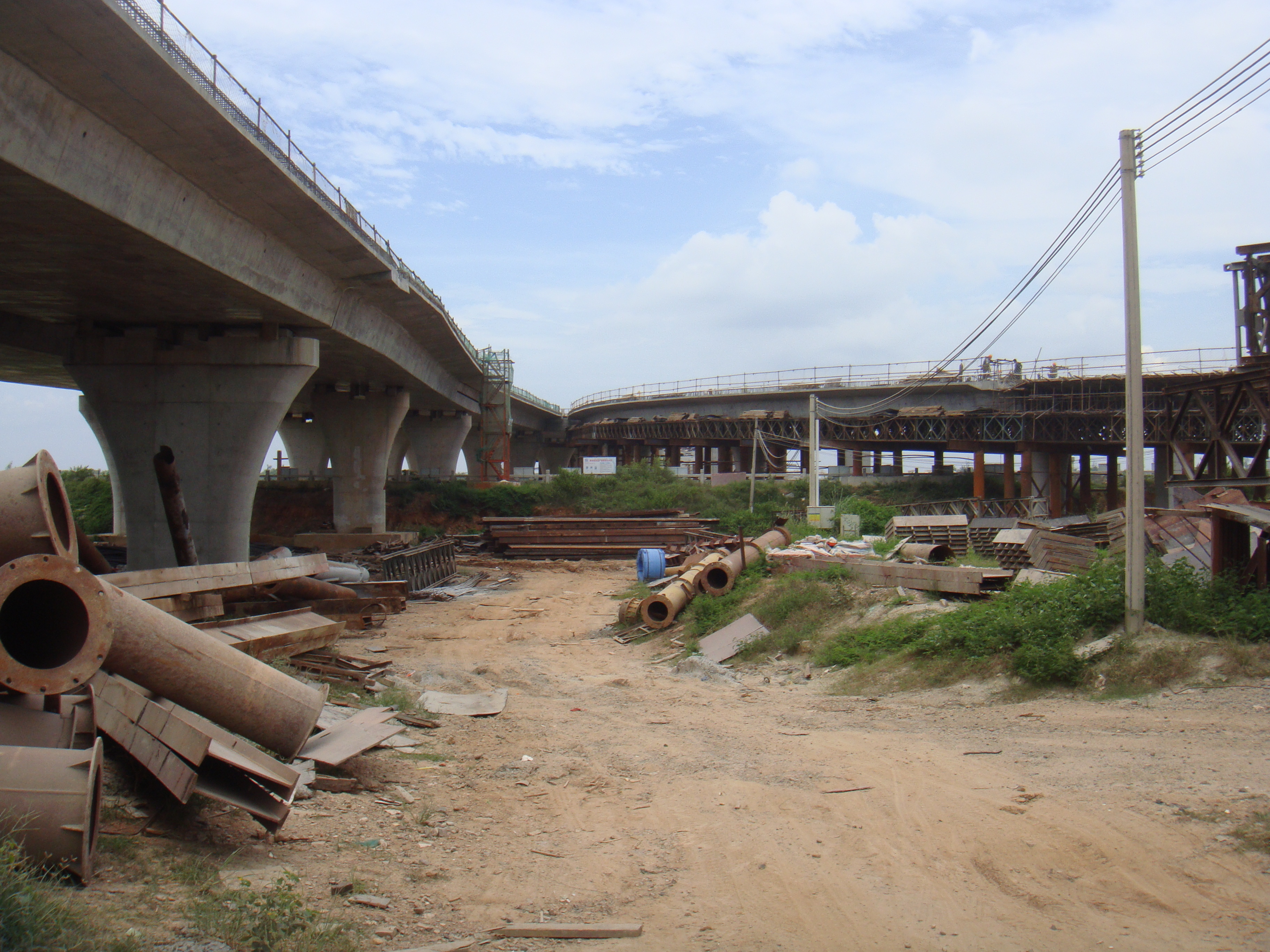

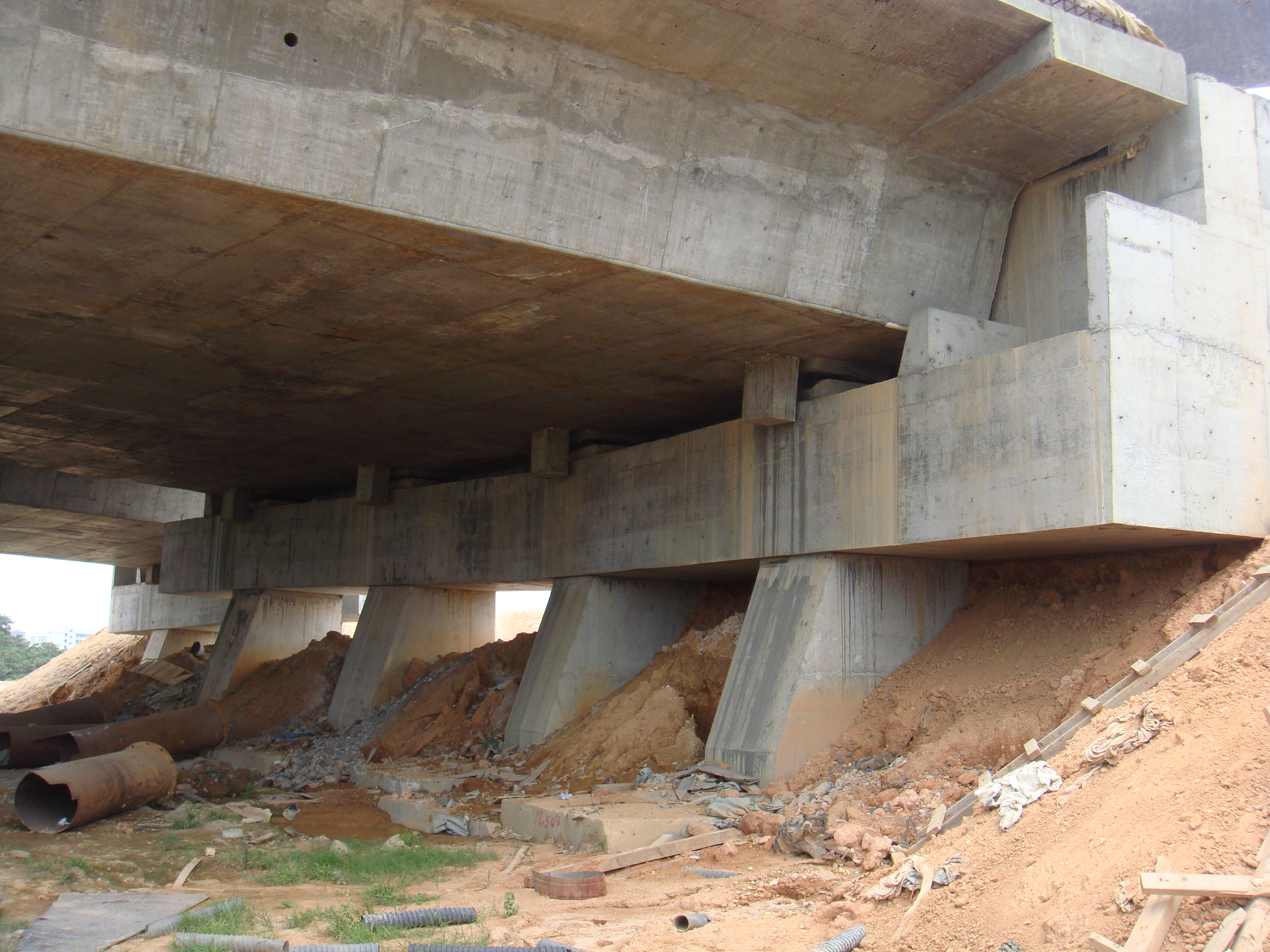

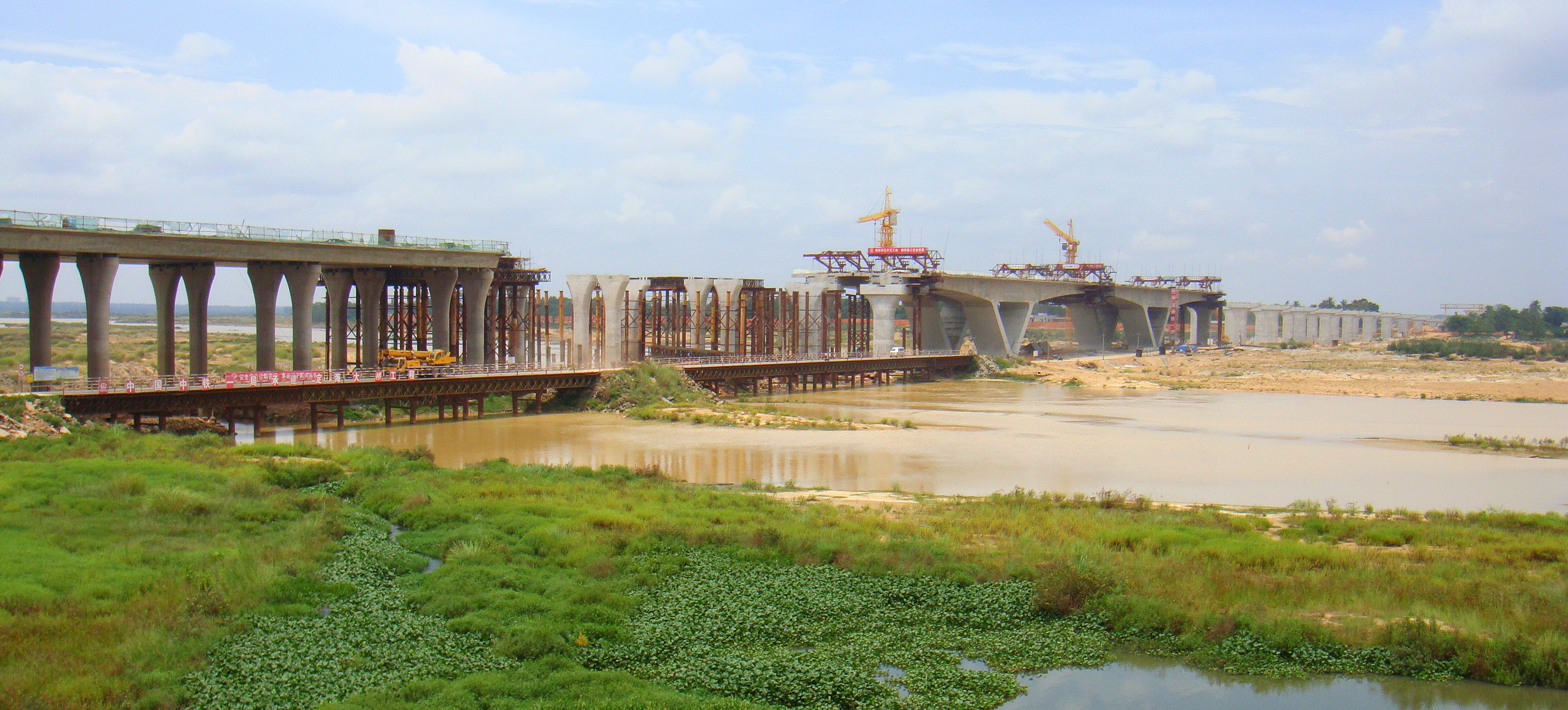

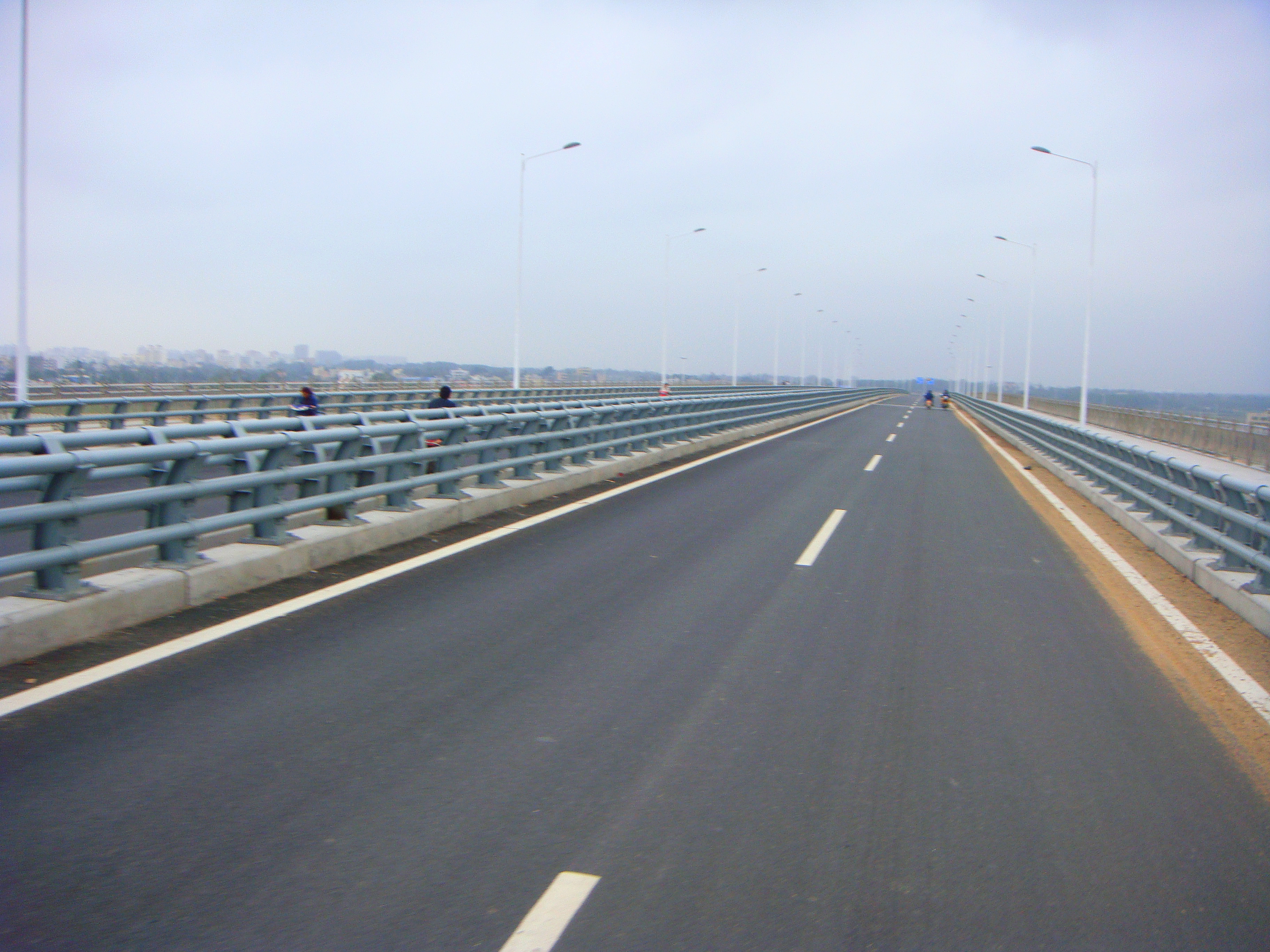

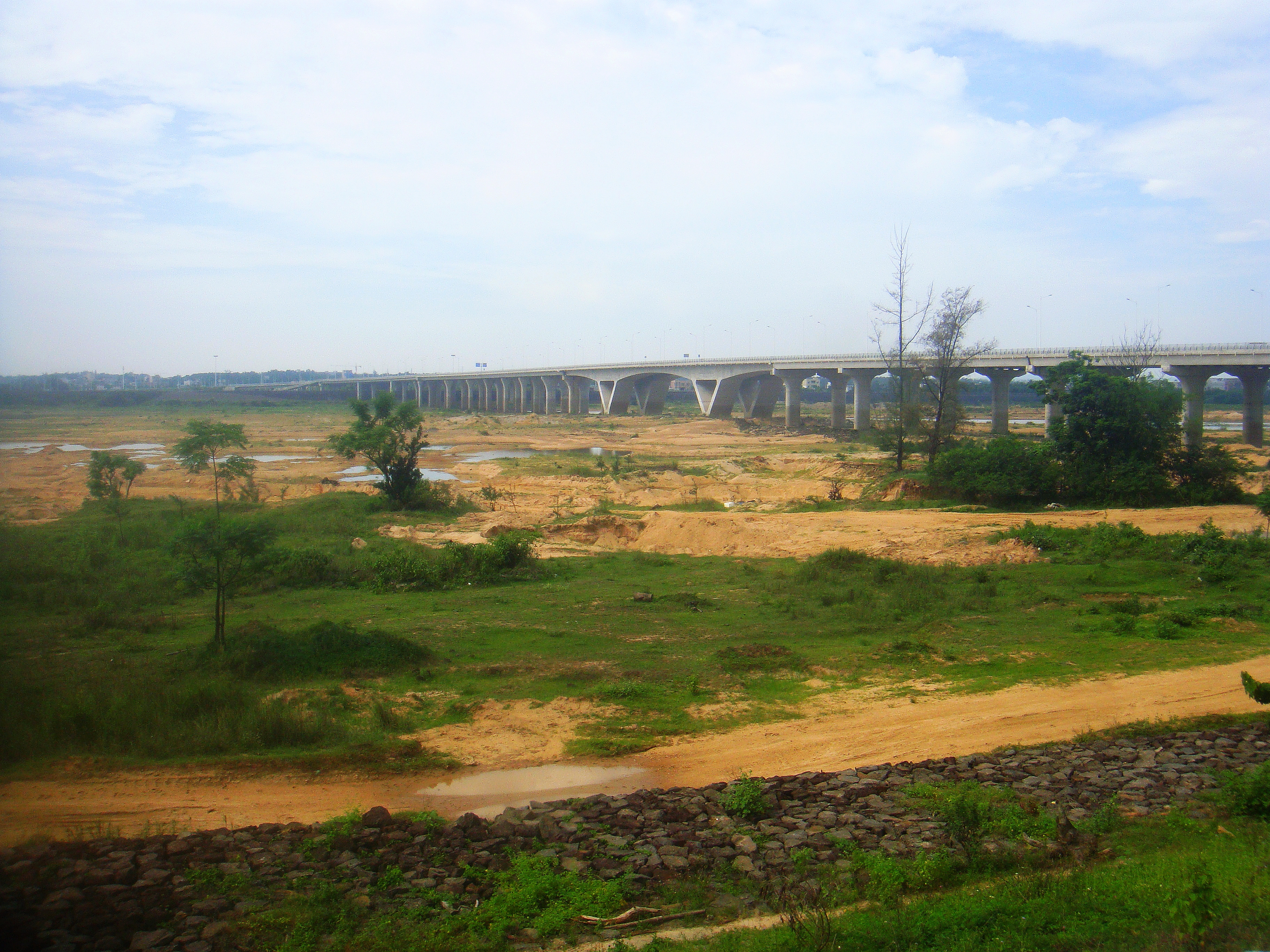
