= Dingcheng =

Dingcheng may refer to the following locations in China:

- Dingcheng District (鼎城区), Changde, Hunan
- Dingcheng, Dingyuan County (定城镇), town in Anhui
- Dingcheng, Ding'an County (定城镇), town and county seat of Ding'an County, Hainan
