= Wuzhou Xijiang Airport =

Wuzhou Xijiang Airport 梧州西江机场
- IATA: WUZ; ICAO: ZGWZ

Summary
- Airport type: Public
- Serves: Wuzhou, Guangxi, China
- Location: Tangbu Town, Teng County
- Opened: 23 January 2019
- Elevation AMSL: 89 ft / 27 m
- Coordinates: 23°24′05″N 111°05′55″E

Map
- Location of airport in Guangxi

Runways
Direction	Length		Surface
Direction	m	ft	Surface
04/22	2,500	8,202

Statistics (2021)
- Passengers: 262,592
- Aircraft movements: 108,008
- Cargo (metric tons): 51.6

Wuzhou Xijiang Airport
- Simplified Chinese: 梧州西江机场
- Traditional Chinese: 梧州西江機場
Transcriptions
Standard Mandarin
- Hanyu Pinyin: Wúzhōu Xījiāng Jīchǎng

Wuzhou Xijiang Airport (IATA: WUZ, ICAO: ZGWZ) is an airport serving the city of Wuzhou in Guangxi Zhuang Autonomous Region, China. It is located south of the Xijiang river in the town of Tangbu in Teng County, 20 kilometres (12 mi) from the city center.

The airport received approval from the State Council of China on 29 June 2014. Construction began in 2016 and the airport was opened on 23 January 2019, replacing the older Wuzhou Changzhoudao Airport. The airport cost 1.765 billion yuan to build.

== Facilities ==
The airport has a 2,600-metre (8,500 ft) runway (class 4C) and an 8,000-square-metre (86,000 sq ft) terminal building with 3 aerobridges. It is projected to handle 750,000 passengers and 6,000 tons of cargo annually by 2025.

== Airlines and destinations ==
Airlines	Destinations
China United Airlines	Beijing–Daxing
Shanghai Airlines	Changsha, Shanghai–Pudong

== See also ==
- List of airports in China
- List of the busiest airports in China
