= Dieshan District =

Former district of Wuzhou, Guangxi, China

Coordinates: 23°28′02″N 111°18′55″E

Dieshan District 蝶山区
- District of the People's Republic of China
- 2013
- Area
- 313 km^{2} (121 sq mi)
Succeeded by
Wanxiu District
- Today part of: Part of the Wanxiu District, Wuzhou

Dieshan (Chinese: 蝶山; pinyin: Diéshān) is a former district of the city of Wuzhou, Guangxi, China. In early 2013 it was merged into Wanxiu District.
