= Dingcheng, Hainan =

Dingcheng 定城镇
- Town
- Location on Hainan Island
- Coordinates: 19°40′49″N 110°22′05″E
- Country: China
- Province: Hainan
- County: Ding'an County

Area
  - Total: 145 km^{2} (56 sq mi)
- Elevation: 38 m (125 ft)

Population (2010)
  - Total: 95,695
  - Density: 660/km^{2} (1,710/sq mi)
- Time zone: UTC+8 (China Standard)

Dingcheng (Chinese: 定城; pinyin: Dìngchéng) is a town and the county seat of Ding'an, in the northeast of Hainan Province, China. It has an area of 145 square kilometres (56 sq mi) and a population of 95,695 as of 2010.

Historically, Dingcheng referred to the old town center beside the Nandu River. Around 2015, a newly developed part of Dingcheng is emerging to the southeast, extending to the east side of G98 Hainan Ring Expressway. This is commonly referred to as Taling and the original may be referred to as "Laocheng" (old town).

== Old and new parts ==
=== Laocheng ===
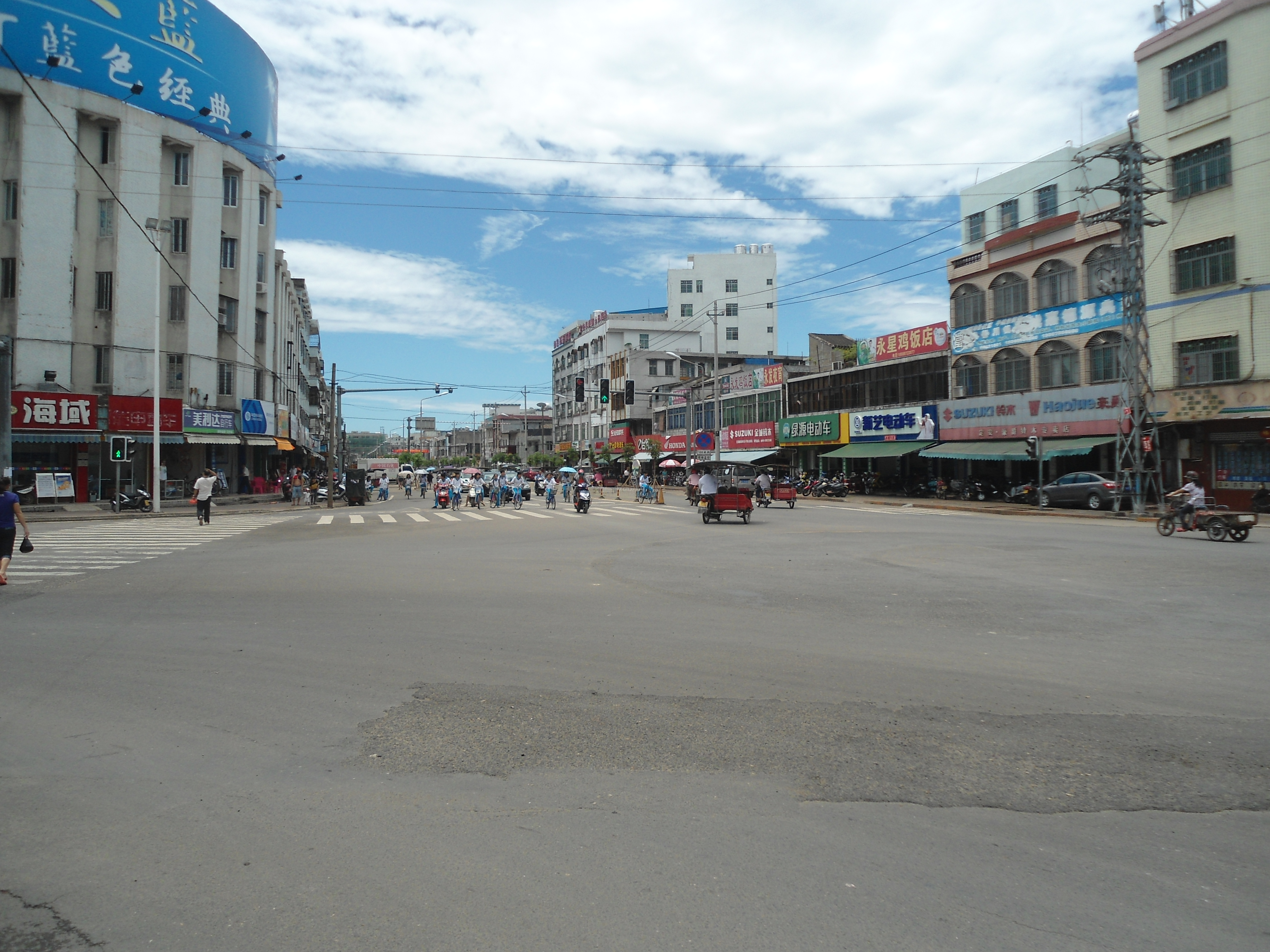
Laocheng

Laocheng (old town) is located directly on the south bank of the Nandu River. The east end is significantly newer and has a park and small stadium by the Nandu. The west end of the town contains many decades-old buildings and other structures, including a tunnel to the river, where a port once existed. The centre of Laocheng has shopping areas, schools, and the main bus station.

=== Taling ===
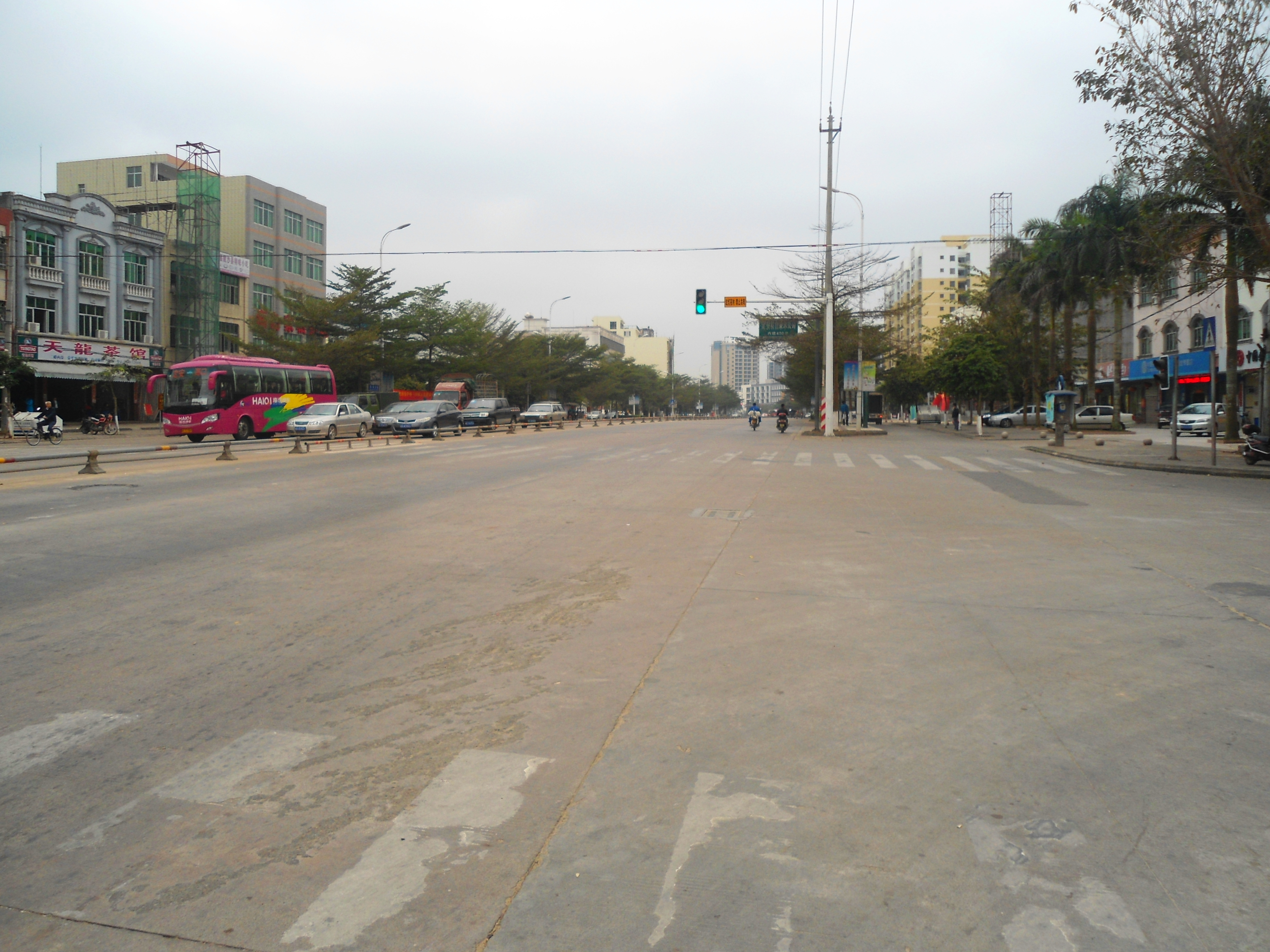
Taling's main street

Taling was almost entirely created since the turn of the millennium. It is located to the southeast of Laocheng. The northernmost boundary is a bridge over a small river that runs into the Nandu River. The southernmost point of Taling is at the entrance to China National Highway 224.

Taling's centre has been developed with numerous high-rise apartment buildings, many of which have been purchased or rented by mainland people who occupy the properties during the winter months. Some government buildings are also located in Taling. The outskirts consist mainly of industrial compounds. Many of the streets are lined with Lagerstroemia speciosa trees.

== Image ==
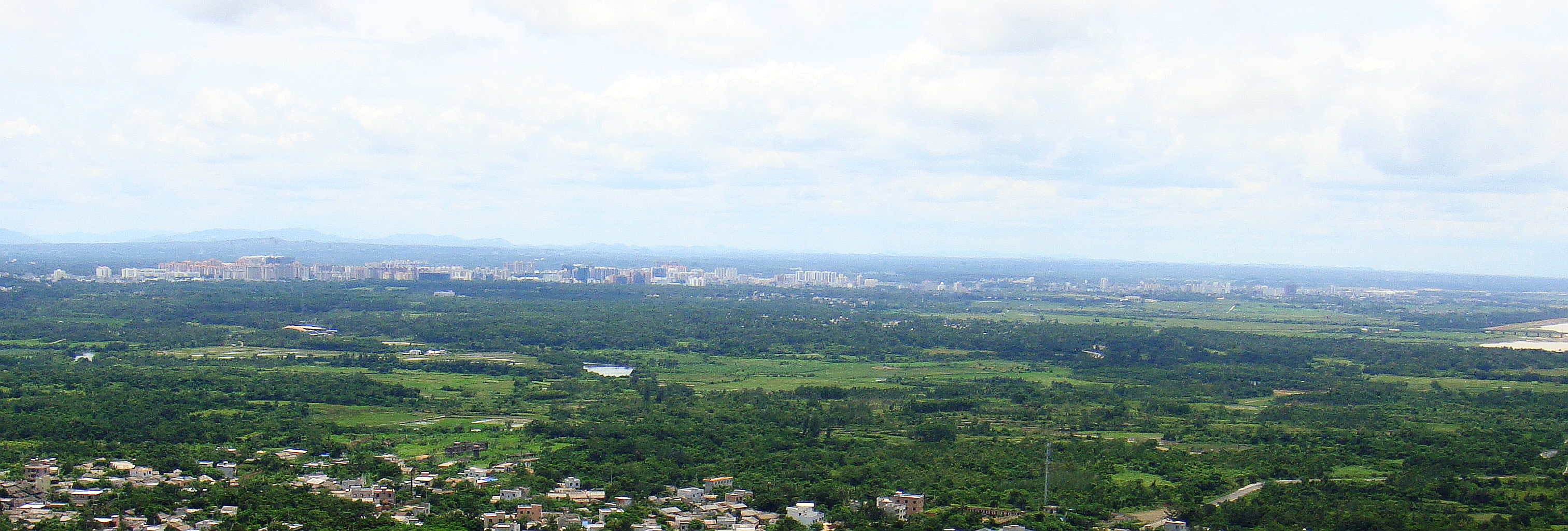
Dingcheng showing the newly developed part at left and old "Laocheng" at right. The white, domed-roof building in the centre is near the northern boundary of the new town. Just north of that building is a river that serves as the de facto dividing line between the old and new parts.

== Access ==
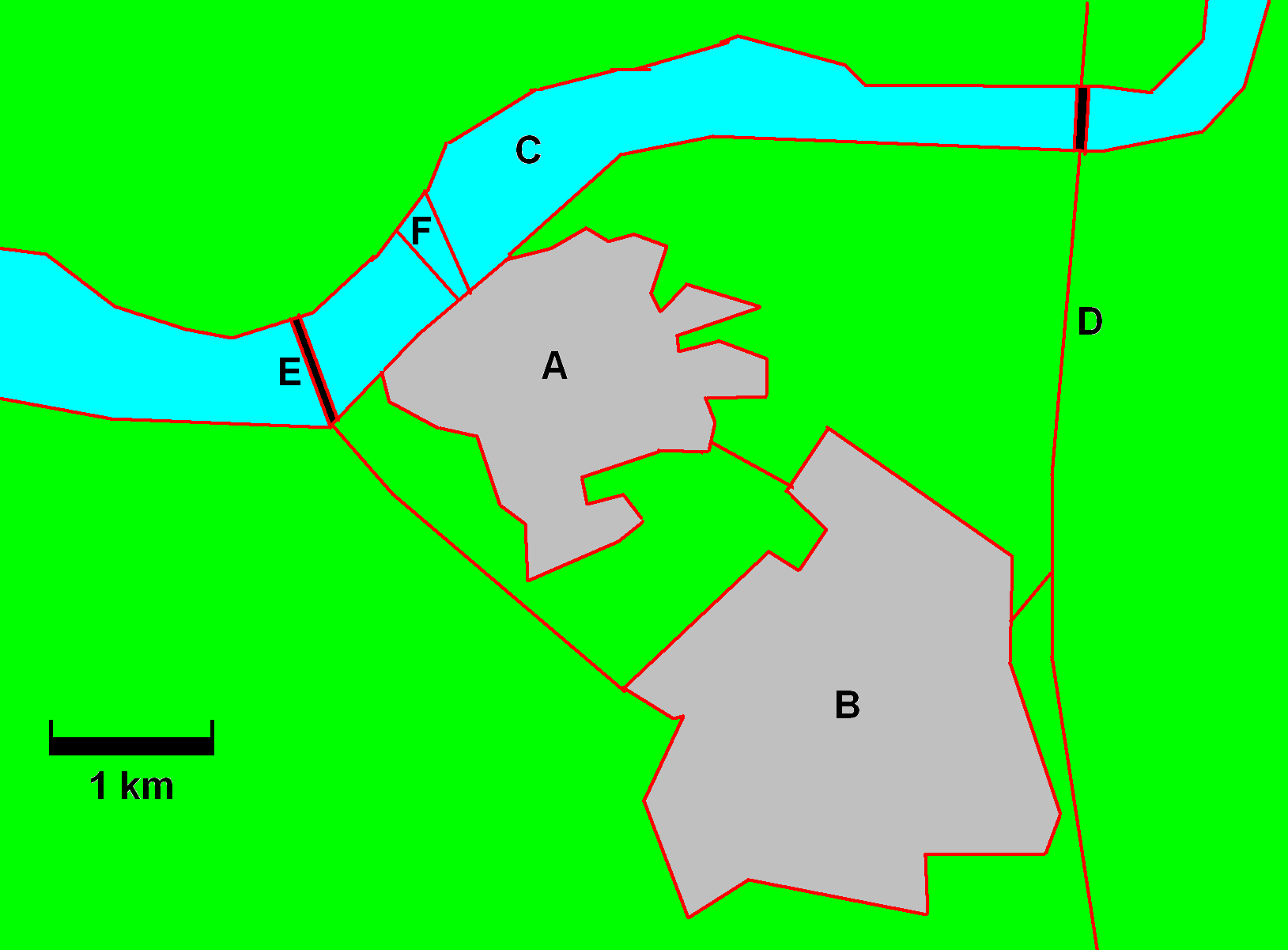
A: Laocheng; B: Taling; C: Nandu River; D: G98 Hainan Ring Expressway; E: Dinghai Bridge; F: Two wooden bridges

Many roads lead to Dingcheng from the south. However, because it is situated directly to the south of the Nandu River, fewer roads access the city from the north. The main access from the north is the G98 Hainan Ring Expressway. This crosses the Nandu east of Laocheng and has an exit at the south end of Taling.

Prior to 2017, there were two, makeshift wooden bridges connecting the north bank of the Nandu with the north of Laocheng. The new Dinghai Bridge was completed in the beginning of 2017 to replace them. It now connects the north bank of the Nandu with the south bank roughly one kilometre west of Laocheng. The road then leads south, west of Laocheng and on to Taling. At the north end of the Dinghai Bridge, a road will eventually be built that will lead all the way north to Haikou.
