= Wanxiu District =

Wanxiu 万秀区 · Vansiu Gih
- District
- Location in Guangxi
- Coordinates: 23°28′23″N 111°19′16″E
- Country: China
- Province: Guangxi
- Prefecture-level city: Wuzhou
- District seat: Chengnan Subdistrict

Area
  - Total: 720 km^{2} (280 sq mi)

Population (2020 census)
  - Total: 271,989
  - Density: 380/km^{2} (980/sq mi)
- Time zone: UTC+8 (China Standard)
- Website: www.wzwxq.gov.cn

Wanxiu District (simplified Chinese: 万秀区; traditional Chinese: 萬秀區; pinyin: Wànxiù Qū) is a district of the city of Wuzhou, Guangxi, China, bordering Guangdong province to the southeast.

== Administrative divisions ==
Wanxiu District is divided into 5 subdistricts and 3 towns:

- Chengnan Subdistrict (城南街道)
- Chengbei Subdistrict (城北街道)
- Jiaozui Subdistrict (角嘴街道)
- Dongxing Subdistrict (东兴街道)
- Fumin Subdistrict (富民街道)
- Chengdong Town (城东镇)
- Longhu Town (龙湖镇)
- Xiaying Town (夏郢镇)
