= Changzhou District =

Changzhou 长洲区· Cangzcouh Gih
- District
- Location in Guangxi
- Country: China
- Autonomous region: Guangxi
- Prefecture-level city: Wuzhou
- District seat: Datang Subdistrict

Area
  - Total: 337.76 km^{2} (130.41 sq mi)
- Time zone: UTC+8 (China Standard)

Changzhou District (simplified Chinese: 长洲区; traditional Chinese: 長洲區; pinyin: Chǎngzhōu Qū) is a district of the city of Wuzhou, Guangxi, China.

== Administrative divisions ==
Changzhou District is divided into 3 sub-districts and 2 towns:

- Datang sub-district (大塘街道)
- Xinglong sub-district (兴龙街道)
- Hongling sub-district (红岭街道)
- Changzhou town (长洲镇)
- Daoshui town (倒水镇)
