= Ding'an County =

Ding'an 定安县
- County
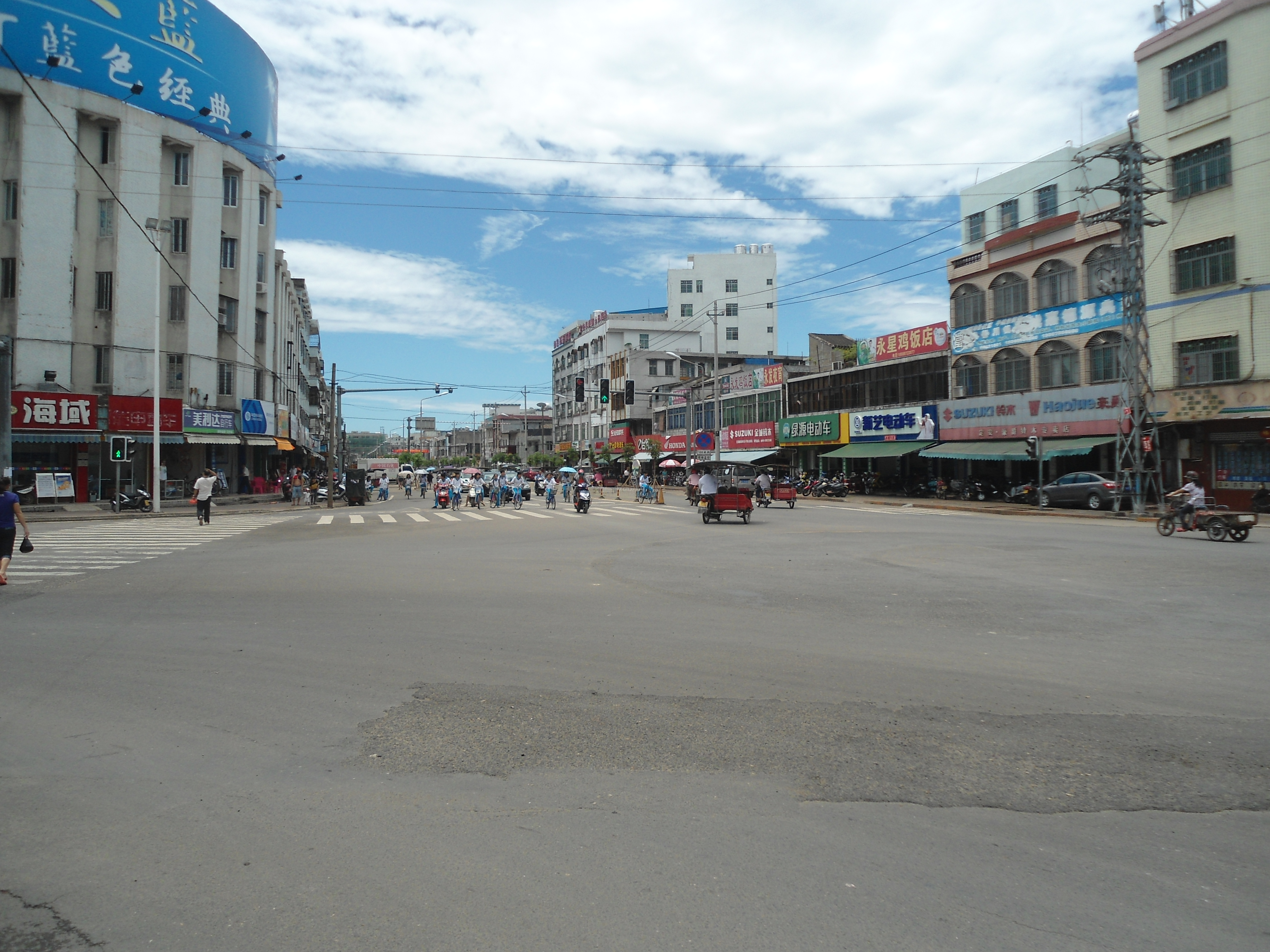

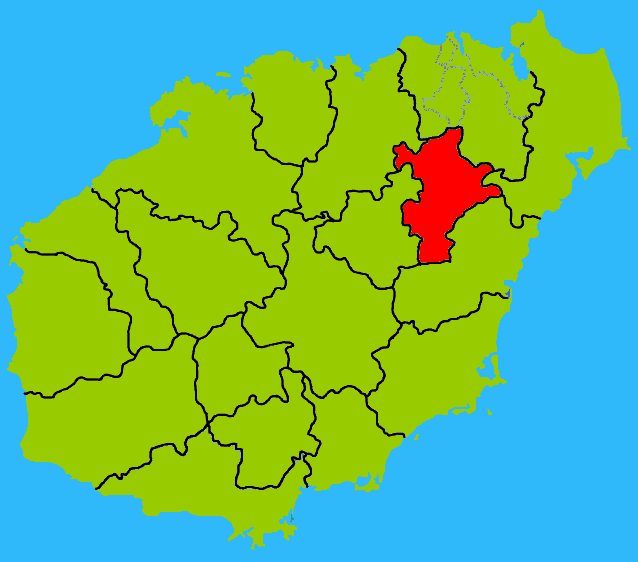
- Location of the county

- Location of the seat in Hainan
- Coordinates: 19°41′53″N 110°21′7″E
- Country: People's Republic of China
- Province: Hainan
- County seat: Dingcheng

Area
  - Total: 1,189 km^{2} (459 sq mi)

Population (2002)
  - Total: 304,522
  - Density: 256.1/km^{2} (663.3/sq mi)
- Time zone: UTC+8 (China standard time)
- Website: www.dingan.gov.cn

Ding'an (Chinese: 定安; pinyin: Dìng'ān; postal: Tingan) is an administrative district in Hainan, People's Republic of China. It is one of 4 counties of Hainan. In 1999, its population was 304,522 people.

The town of Dingcheng is the main population center.

== Climate ==
Ding'an a tropical monsoon climate (Köppen Am).

Climate data for Ding'an, elevation 53 m (174 ft), (1991–2020 normals, extremes 1961–present)
Month	Jan	Feb	Mar	Apr	May	Jun	Jul	Aug	Sep	Oct	Nov	Dec	Year
Record high °C (°F)	33.5 (92.3)	36.2 (97.2)	38.5 (101.3)	40.0 (104.0)	40.0 (104.0)	40.1 (104.2)	39.4 (102.9)	37.3 (99.1)	37.6 (99.7)	35.5 (95.9)	34.5 (94.1)	32.5 (90.5)	40.1 (104.2)
Mean daily maximum °C (°F)	22.6 (72.7)	24.4 (75.9)	27.8 (82.0)	30.9 (87.6)	33.1 (91.6)	34.0 (93.2)	33.8 (92.8)	33.1 (91.6)	31.7 (89.1)	29.5 (85.1)	26.9 (80.4)	23.3 (73.9)	29.3 (84.7)
Daily mean °C (°F)	18.3 (64.9)	19.9 (67.8)	22.9 (73.2)	25.9 (78.6)	27.8 (82.0)	28.8 (83.8)	28.7 (83.7)	28.1 (82.6)	27.1 (80.8)	25.2 (77.4)	22.7 (72.9)	19.3 (66.7)	24.6 (76.2)
Mean daily minimum °C (°F)	15.6 (60.1)	17.1 (62.8)	19.9 (67.8)	22.7 (72.9)	24.6 (76.3)	25.5 (77.9)	25.5 (77.9)	25.1 (77.2)	24.4 (75.9)	22.5 (72.5)	20.0 (68.0)	16.8 (62.2)	21.6 (71.0)
Record low °C (°F)	2.7 (36.9)	7.5 (45.5)	6.1 (43.0)	14.6 (58.3)	16.9 (62.4)	20.9 (69.6)	21.0 (69.8)	21.8 (71.2)	19.3 (66.7)	14.3 (57.7)	9.3 (48.7)	5.0 (41.0)	2.7 (36.9)
Average precipitation mm (inches)	25.7 (1.01)	31.2 (1.23)	40.2 (1.58)	125.2 (4.93)	255.1 (10.04)	234.7 (9.24)	266.5 (10.49)	324.0 (12.76)	302.0 (11.89)	272.6 (10.73)	54.3 (2.14)	42.2 (1.66)	1,973.7 (77.7)
Average precipitation days (≥ 0.1 mm)	9.5	9.4	9.3	12.1	17.5	16.6	16.5	18.6	16.3	11.4	9.2	9.1	155.5
Average relative humidity (%)	86	85	84	82	82	81	81	84	86	84	84	84	84
Mean monthly sunshine hours	87.7	96.1	131.9	162.6	202.2	208.5	220.8	195.6	155.7	146.1	109.7	87.0	1,803.9
Percentage possible sunshine	26	30	35	43	50	52	54	50	43	41	33	26	40
Source: China Meteorological Administration all-time extremes all-time March recordall-time October record

== See also ==
- List of administrative divisions of Hainan
