= Wuzhou =

Wuzhou 梧州市 Wuchow
- Prefecture-level city
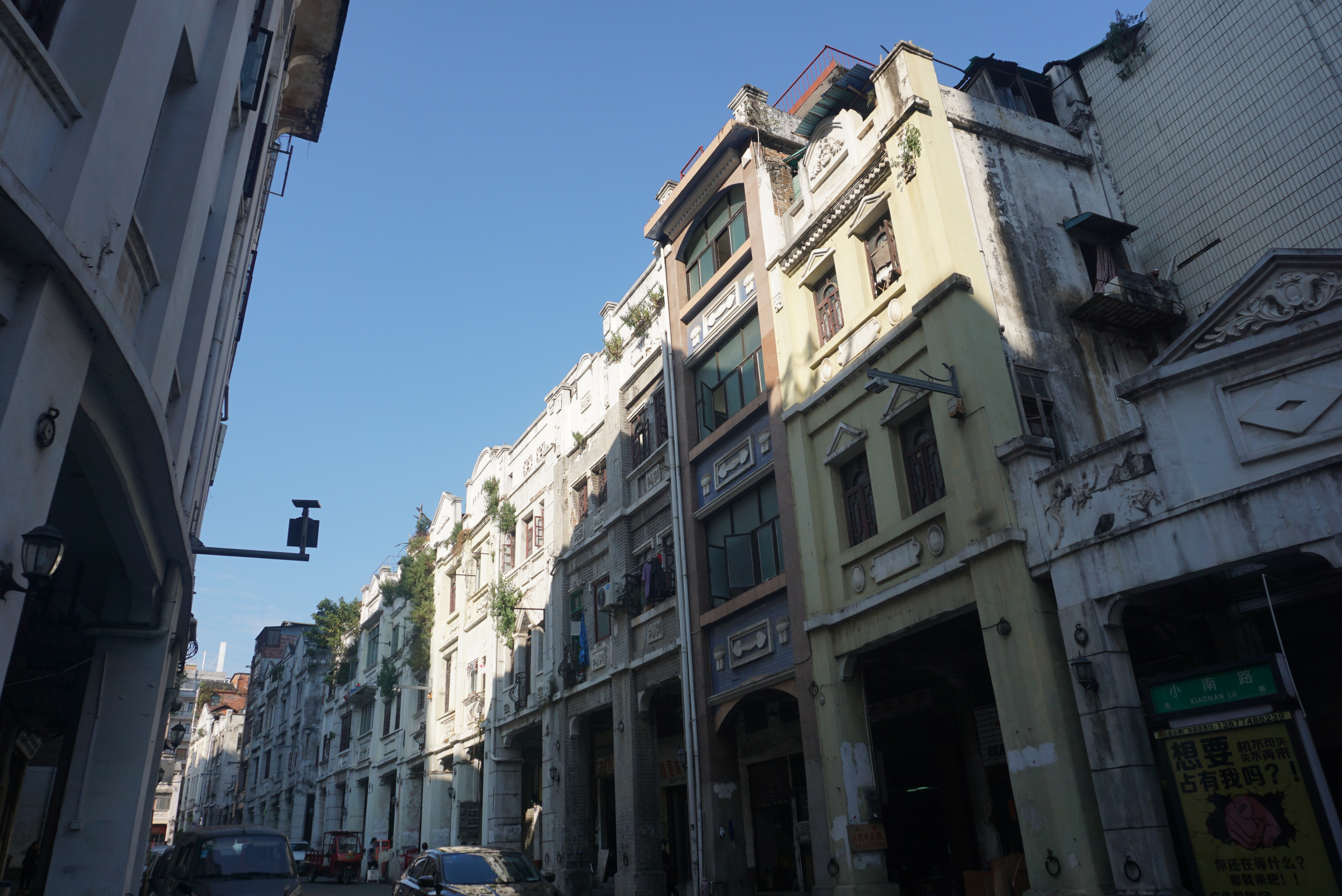

- Location of Wuzhou City jurisdiction in Guangxi

- Location in China
- Coordinates (Wuzhou municipal government): 23°28′36″N 111°16′44″E
- Country: China
- Region: Guangxi
- Municipal seat: Changzhou District

Government
  - Communist Party Boss: Liu Zhiyong
  - Mayor: Wang Kai

Area
  - City: 12,588 km^{2} (4,860 sq mi)
  - Urban: 1,792 km^{2} (692 sq mi)
  - Metro: 1,792 km^{2} (692 sq mi)

Population (2020 census)
  - City: 2,820,977
  - Density: 224.10/km^{2} (580.42/sq mi)
  - Urban: 859,815
  - Urban density: 479.8/km^{2} (1,243/sq mi)
  - Metro: 859,815
  - Metro density: 479.8/km^{2} (1,243/sq mi)

GDP
  - City: CN¥ 136.9 billion US$ 21.2 billion
  - Per capita: CN¥ 48,463; US$ 7,512
- Time zone: UTC+8 (China Standard)
- Postal code: 543000 (Wanxiu District)
- Area code: 0774
- ISO 3166 code: CN-GX-04
- Licence plate prefixes: 桂D
- Website: wuzhou.gov.cn

Wuzhou (Chinese: 梧州; pinyin: Wúzhōu; Jyutping: Ng⁴zau¹, postal: Wuchow; Zhuang: Ngouzcouh / Ŋouƨcouƅ) is a prefecture-level city in the east of Guangxi, China.

By the end of 2024, the city's resident population is 2,827,700, including 1,623,900 urban residents, and the urbanization rate of the resident population is 57.43%.

== Geography and climate ==
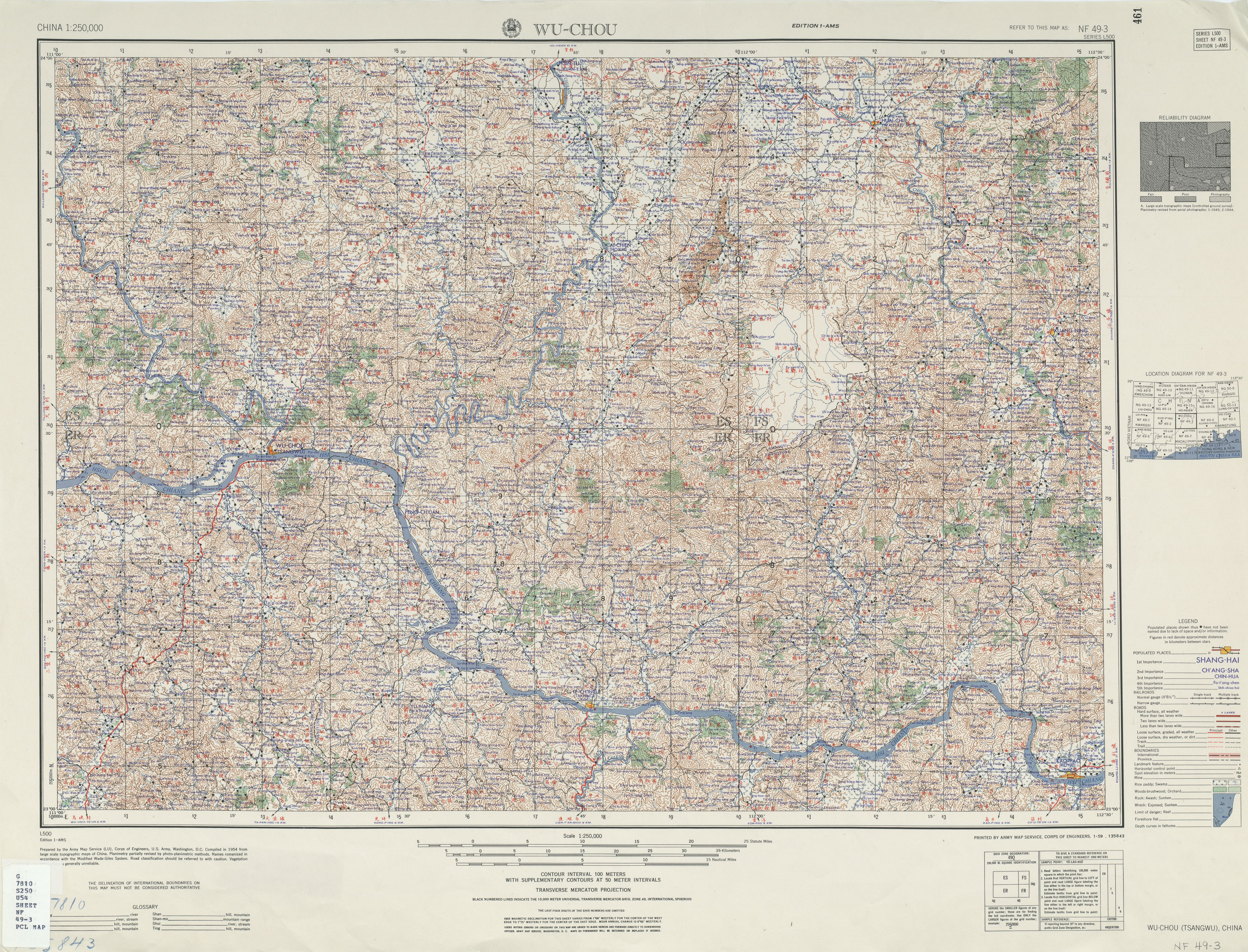
Map including Wuzhou (labeled as WU-CHOU (TSANGWU) 梧州) (AMS, 1954)

Wuzhou is located in eastern Guangxi bordering Guangdong province. It is at the confluence of the Gui River and the Xun River where they form the Xi River; 85% of all water in Guangxi flows through Wuzhou. The total area of Wuzhou is 12,588 km^{2} (4,860 sq mi).

The Tropic of Cancer bisects the city. Despite its latitude, Wuzhou has a monsoon-influenced humid subtropical climate (Köppen Cfa), with short, mild winters, and long, very hot and humid summers. Winter begins dry but becomes progressively wetter and cloudier. Spring is generally overcast and often rainy, while summer continues to be rainy though is the sunniest time of year. Autumn is sunny and dry. The monthly 24-hour average temperature ranges from 12.2 °C (54.0 °F) in January to 28.2 °C (82.8 °F) in July, and the annual mean is 21.24 °C (70.2 °F). The annual rainfall is just above 1,450 mm (57 in), and is delivered in bulk (~47%) from April to June, when the plum rains occur and often create the risk of flooding. With monthly percent possible sunshine ranging from 17% in March to 55% in July, the city receives 1,738 hours of bright sunshine annually. Extreme temperatures have ranged from −3.0 °C (27 °F) to 39.7 °C (103 °F) on February 11, 1957 and July 17, 1989 respectively.

Climate data for Wuzhou, elevation 115 m (377 ft), (1991–2020 normals, extremes 1951–present)
Month	Jan	Feb	Mar	Apr	May	Jun	Jul	Aug	Sep	Oct	Nov	Dec	Year
Record high °C (°F)	30.4 (86.7)	34.5 (94.1)	35.0 (95.0)	36.3 (97.3)	37.0 (98.6)	37.7 (99.9)	39.7 (103.5)	39.2 (102.6)	38.6 (101.5)	36.7 (98.1)	33.4 (92.1)	30.4 (86.7)	39.7 (103.5)
Mean daily maximum °C (°F)	17.0 (62.6)	18.9 (66.0)	21.4 (70.5)	26.4 (79.5)	30.3 (86.5)	32.3 (90.1)	33.5 (92.3)	33.4 (92.1)	32.0 (89.6)	28.9 (84.0)	24.4 (75.9)	19.3 (66.7)	26.5 (79.7)
Daily mean °C (°F)	12.3 (54.1)	14.3 (57.7)	17.1 (62.8)	21.9 (71.4)	25.4 (77.7)	27.3 (81.1)	28.3 (82.9)	28.1 (82.6)	26.7 (80.1)	23.5 (74.3)	18.8 (65.8)	13.9 (57.0)	21.5 (70.6)
Mean daily minimum °C (°F)	9.0 (48.2)	11.0 (51.8)	14.1 (57.4)	18.7 (65.7)	22.0 (71.6)	24.2 (75.6)	24.9 (76.8)	24.7 (76.5)	23.2 (73.8)	19.5 (67.1)	14.9 (58.8)	10.1 (50.2)	18.0 (64.5)
Record low °C (°F)	−1.8 (28.8)	−3.0 (26.6)	1.7 (35.1)	7.1 (44.8)	13.0 (55.4)	16.6 (61.9)	20.3 (68.5)	19.8 (67.6)	14.8 (58.6)	7.2 (45.0)	2.4 (36.3)	−1.5 (29.3)	−3.0 (26.6)
Average precipitation mm (inches)	59.5 (2.34)	53.3 (2.10)	105.6 (4.16)	157.1 (6.19)	230.5 (9.07)	263.0 (10.35)	192.1 (7.56)	183.5 (7.22)	104.0 (4.09)	44.2 (1.74)	50.7 (2.00)	39.0 (1.54)	1,482.5 (58.36)
Average precipitation days (≥ 0.1 mm)	9.3	9.9	14.8	15.2	18.5	19.4	16.7	15.8	10.5	5.2	6.6	7.2	149.1
Average snowy days	0.1	0	0	0	0	0	0	0	0	0	0	0	0.1
Average relative humidity (%)	75	77	82	82	82	84	81	81	78	73	73	71	78
Mean monthly sunshine hours	92.7	75.5	61.6	92.3	139.6	160.2	213.8	204.7	187.7	192.9	158.0	137.2	1,716.2
Percentage possible sunshine	27	23	17	24	34	40	52	51	51	54	48	42	39
Source: China Meteorological Administration all-time extreme temperatureNOAA All-time May high all-time October record high

== Demographics ==
According to the 2020 Chinese census, its total population was 2,820,977 inhabitants of whom 859,815 lived in its built-up (or metro) area made of 3 urban districts. The average annual population decrease for the period 2010–2020 was −0.21% while the overall decrease rate is −2.12%.

The dominant ethnic group in the prefecture-level city is Han Chinese but there are also Zhuang, Yao and others. Wuzhou traditionally belongs to the Cantonese cultural and linguistic region, so most people speak the Wuzhou dialect of Cantonese and Mandarin as a result of the Central Government's Mandarin promotion.

== Administration ==
Wuzhou has 3 counties, 1 county-level city and 3 districts.

Map
Name	Hanzi	Hanyu Pinyin	Area (km^{2})	Population (2010)	Density (/km^{2})
Changzhou District	长洲区	Chángzhōu Qū	378	160,000	423
Wanxiu District	万秀区	Wànxiù Qū	439	320,000	728
Longxu District	龙圩区	Lóngxū Qū	971	270,000	278
Cenxi City	岑溪市	Cénxī Shì	2,783	920,000	330
Cangwu County	苍梧县	Cāngwú Xiàn	2,784	360,000	129
Teng County	藤县	Téng Xiàn	3,946	1,040,000	263
Mengshan County	蒙山县	Méngshān Xiàn	1,279	220,000	166

- Dieshan District was abolished on 2013

== Delicacies ==
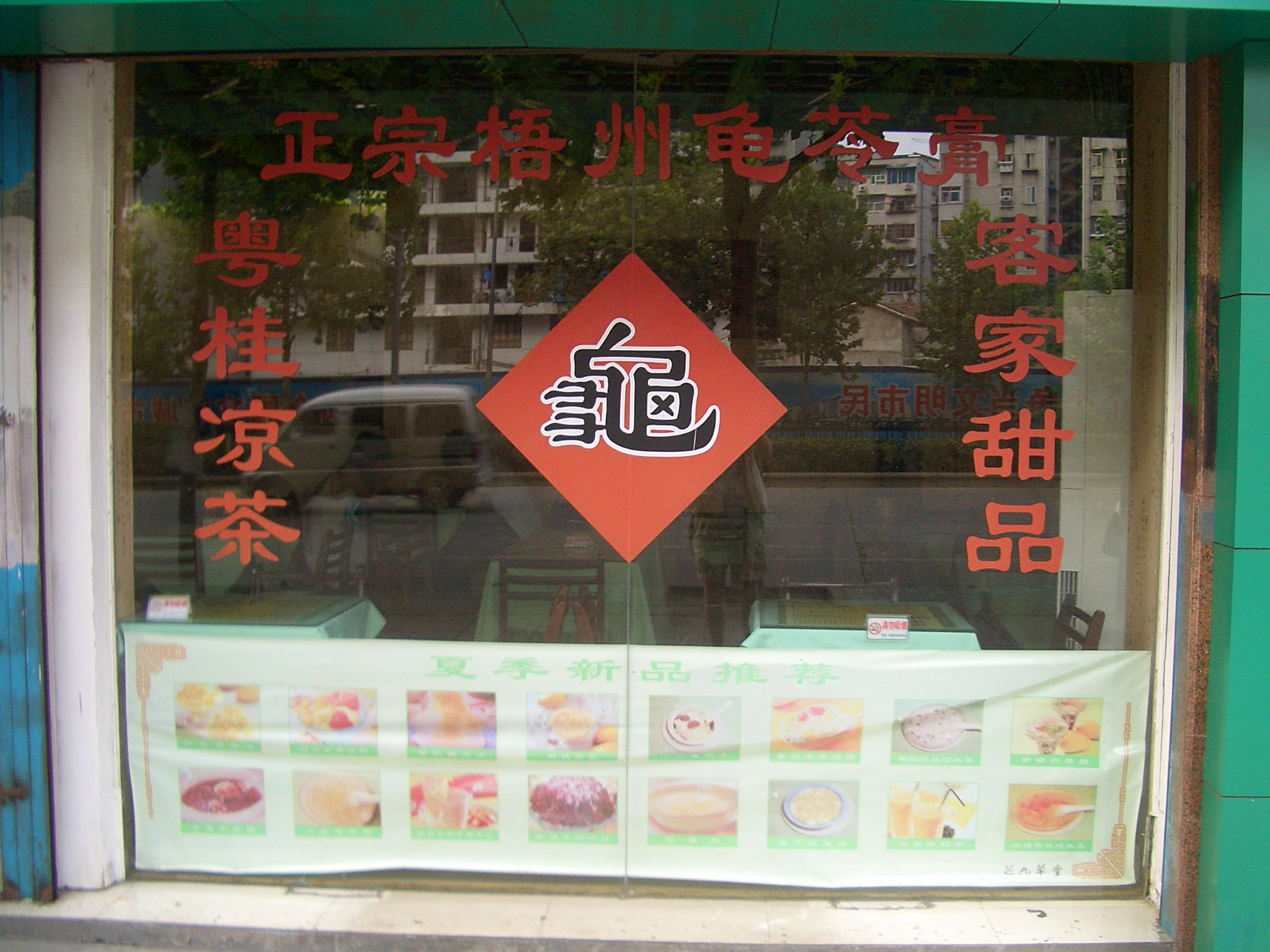
A restaurant in Wuhan advertising "Genuine Wuzhou Guilinggao"

Amongst the agricultural products produced in the region of Wuzhou, one of the most favoured snacks is Wuzhou honey date (梧州蜜枣). Guilinggao jelly is also described as a "Wuzhou delicacy". Bingquan Soy Milk (冰泉豆浆) is also welcomed by people and is in the list of premium choices for breakfast.

== Trade ==
Wuzhou has become a hub of the synthetic gemstone trade, particularly specializing in corundum, spinel and cubic zirconia.

== Transportation ==
High Speed Railway

- Nanning–Guangzhou high-speed railway

Railway

- Luozhan Railway

Expressway

- Nanwu Expressway

Highway

- China National Highway 207
- China National Highway 321

Air

- Wuzhou Xijiang Airport
