= 1888 in art =

The year 1888 in art involved some significant events.

== Events ==
- January 26 – Paul Gauguin leaves Paris to rejoin the Pont-Aven School of artists in Brittany, where he will remain until October and meet with Émile Bernard
- February – Fifth annual exhibition of Les XX, at the Royal Museums of Fine Arts of Belgium in Brussels. Artists invited to show in addition to members of the group include Henri-Edmond Cross, Albert Dubois-Pillet, Odilon Redon, Paul Signac, Henri de Toulouse-Lautrec and James McNeill Whistler
- February 21 – Vincent van Gogh moves to Arles where he will be very productive as a painter
- March – Van Gogh begins his Langlois Bridge at Arles series
- March 22 – Fourth exhibition by the Société des Artistes Indépendants opens in Paris; it includes three paintings by van Gogh
- June – Van Gogh visits Saintes-Maries-de-la-Mer
- July 14
  - The Monument à Léon Gambetta, by Jean-Paul Aubé, is inaugurated at the Louvre
  - Critic Emile Hennequin drowns at Samois-sur-Seine before his protégé Odilon Redon
- August – Van Gogh begins his Décoration for the Yellow House at Arles including the Arles Sunflowers series of paintings
- August 11 – James McNeill Whistler marries fellow-artist Beatrice ("Trixie") Godwin (née Beatrix Birnie Philip), widow of architect E. W. Godwin, and they spend a working honeymoon in France
- October 3 – Leeds City Art Gallery in England opens
- October 23 – Paul Gauguin joins van Gogh in Arles, bringing Émile Bernard's painting Le Pardon de Pont-Aven
- December 23 – Having quarrelled with Gauguin, van Gogh cuts off the lower part of his own left ear, taking it to a brothel, and is removed to the local hospital
- Paul Ranson, Paul Sérusier and Maurice Denis become fellow students at the Académie Julian and form Les Nabis
- The weekly illustrated newspaper The Graphic commissions and exhibits in London 21 paintings of Shakespeare's heroines
- William De Morgan moves his London art pottery from Merton Abbey to Fulham
- Publication in English of Irish-born writer George Moore's autobiographical novel Confessions of a Young Man (London) describing bohemian life in 1870s Paris among the Impressionist painters

== Exhibitions ==
- International Exhibition of Science, Art and Industry, in Glasgow, Scotland

== Works ==
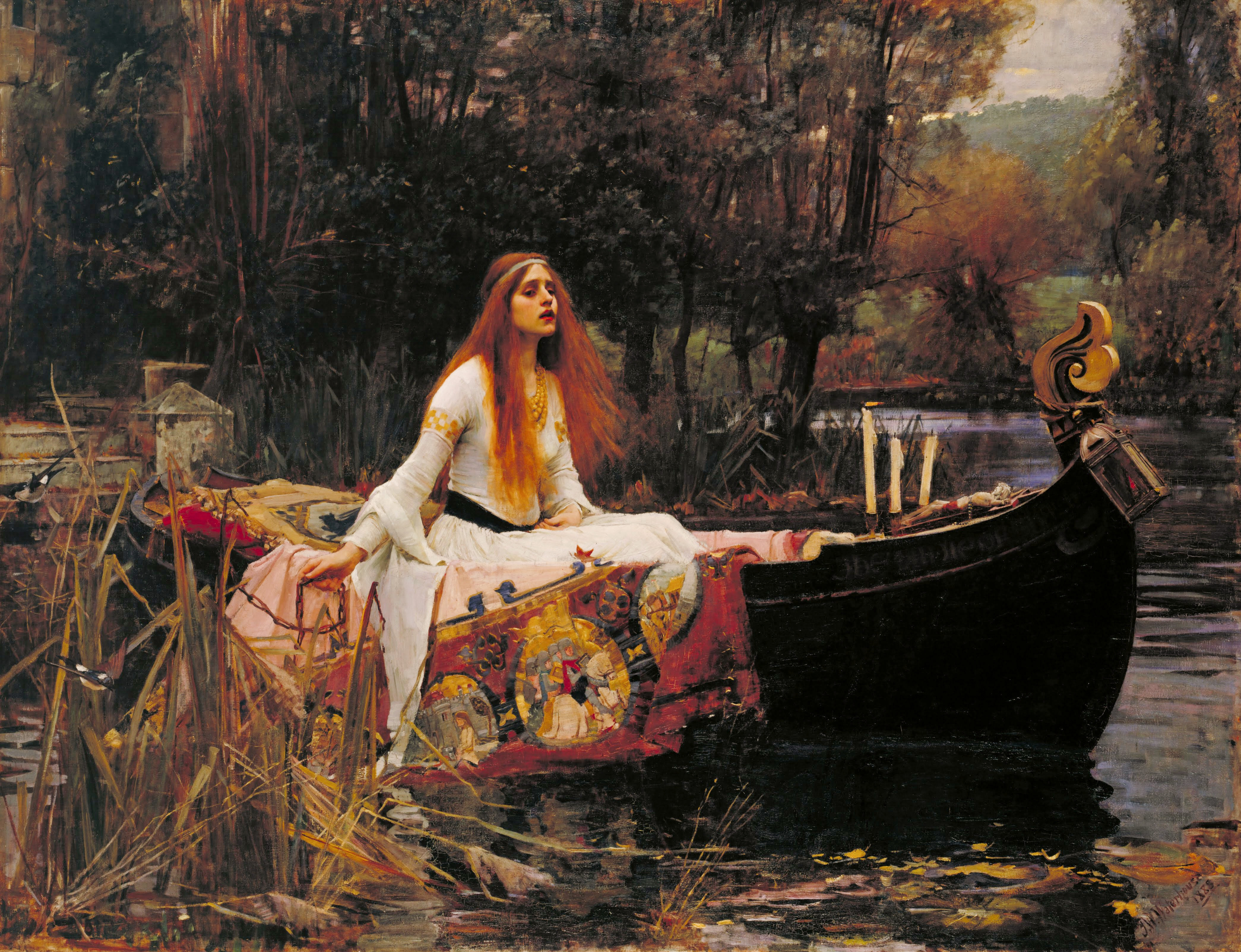
J. W. Waterhouse – The Lady of Shalott

- Lawrence Alma-Tadema – The Roses of Heliogabalus
- Reinhold Begas – Centaur and Nymph (bronze)
- Émile Bernard
  - Le Pardon de Pont-Aven ("Breton Women in the Meadow")
  - Brothel Scene, for Vincent (watercolor)
  - Self-portrait with portrait of Paul Gauguin
  - The Yellow Tree
- Joseph Boehm
  - Equestrian statue of the Duke of Wellington (Hyde Park Corner, London)
  - Queen Victoria Statue (College Green, Bristol)
- Eugène Boudin – The Entrance to Trouville Harbour
- William-Adolphe Bouguereau – The First Mourning
- Edward Burne-Jones – The Nativity
- Gustave Caillebotte
  - The Plain of Gennevilliers
  - Sailing boats at Argenteuil
- Charles Calverley – Statue of Robert Burns (Albany, New York)
- Émile Friant – La Toussaint
- Philip Hermogenes Calderon – Juliet
- William Merritt Chase
  - The Blue Kimono
  - Modern Magdalen
  - Portrait of a Lady in Pink
- Charles Conder – A holiday at Mentone
- David Edward Cronin – Fugitive Slaves in the Dismal Swamp, Virginia
- Édouard Detaille – Le Rêve
- Alexander Doyle – William Jasper Monument
- James Ensor – The Entry of Christ into Brussels in 1889 (J. Paul Getty Museum, Malibu)
- Akseli Gallen-Kallela – Démasquée
- Andrew Carrick Gow – A Lost Cause
- Paul Gauguin
  - Madame Ginoux (drawing)
  - The Painter of Sunflowers (December)
  - Self-Portrait with Portrait of Émile Bernard (Les misérables)
  - Vision After the Sermon
- Alfred Gilbert – Statue of Queen Victoria (Winchester)
- Antonio Gisbert Pérez - Execution of Torrijos and his Companions on the Beach at Málaga
- Peder Severin Krøyer – Hip, Hip, Hurrah!
- Frederic Leighton – Captive Andromache (approximate date)
- William Logsdail – St Martin-in-the-Fields
- Cesare Maccari – Cicero Denounces Catiline (fresco in Palazzo Madama, Rome)
- John Everett Millais – Portrait of Arthur Sullivan
- Albert Joseph Moore – A River Side
- Philip Richard Morris – Audrey
- Giovanni Muzzioli – The Funeral of Britannicus
- Armand Point – Thursday's walk in the fields
- Ilya Repin
  - Saint Nicholas of Myra saves three innocents from death
  - They Did Not Expect Him
- Herbert Gustave Schmalz – Zenobia's Last Look on Palmyra
- Paul Sérusier – Le Talisman
- Georges Seurat – completion of Models (Les Poseuses) (Barnes Foundation, Philadelphia)
- Henri de Toulouse-Lautrec – At the Circus Fernando, Equestrienne
- Henry Scott Tuke – The Bathers
- Giovanni Turini – Statue of Giuseppe Garibaldi (bronze, Washington Square Park, New York City)
- John Henry Twachtman – Landscape, Branchville
- J. W. Waterhouse – The Lady of Shalott

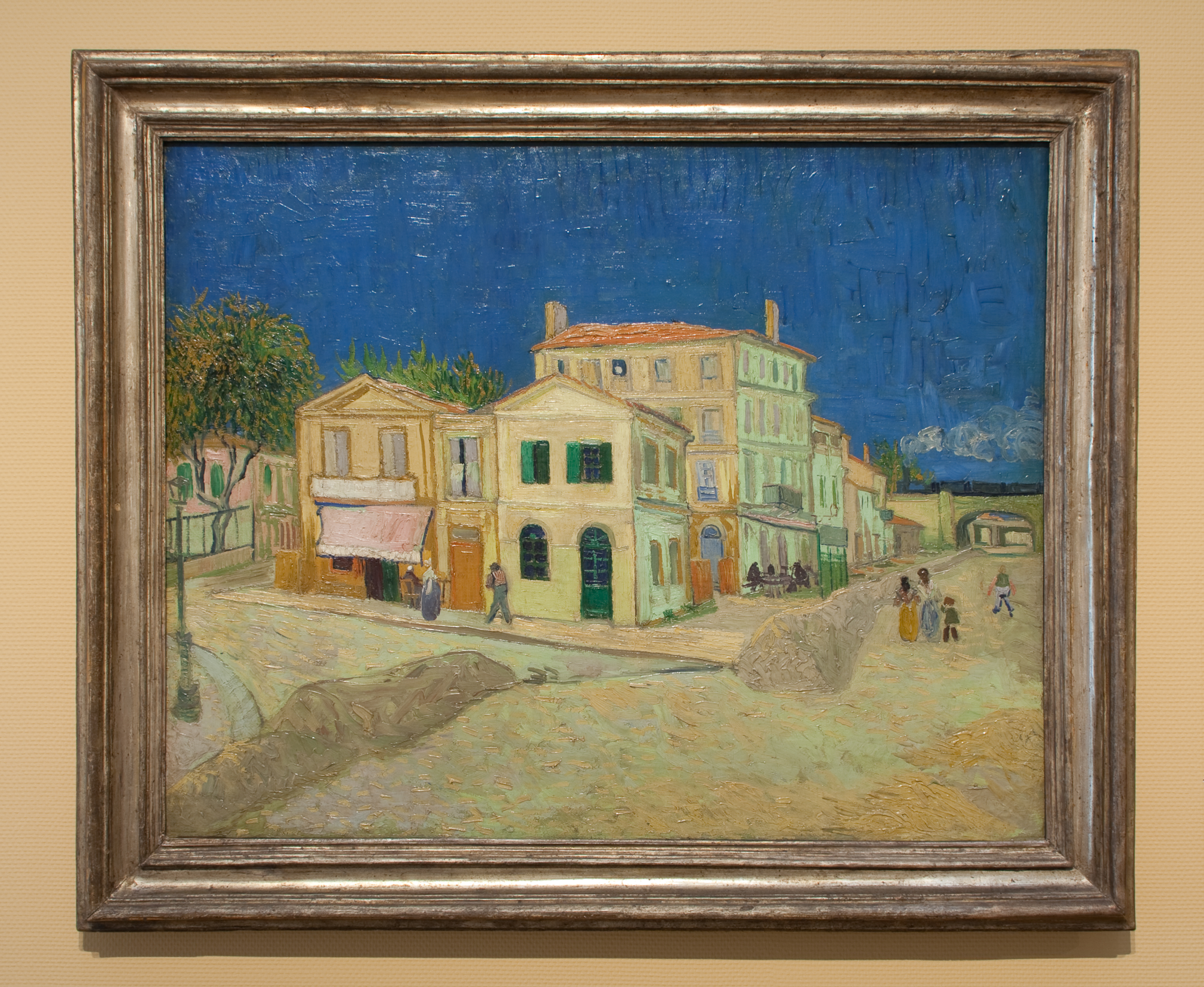
van Gogh – The Yellow House

- Vincent van Gogh
  - Saintes-Maries series
    - Fishing Boats on the Beach at Saintes-Maries-de-la-Mer (June)
    - The Sea at Les Saintes-Maries-de-la-Mer (June)
  - Harvest (at La Crau, with Montmajour in the Background) (June)
  - Corn Harvest in Provence
  - Farmhouse in Provence
  - La Mousmé
  - Sunset at Montmajour (August)
  - Cafe Terrace at Night (Kröller-Müller Museum, Otterlo) (September)
  - The Night Café (September)
  - The Yellow House (September)
  - Bedroom in Arles (first version; October)
  - The Red Vineyard (November)
  - The Sower (Sower with the Setting Sun) (June)
  - Tarascon Diligence (October)
  - Vincent's Chair and Gauguin's Armchair (November)
  - Les Arènes (November or December)

== Births ==
- January 1
  - Chesley Bonestell, American space art painter and designer (died 1986).
  - Augustus Dunbier, American painter (died 1977).
- January 17 – Mohamed Nagy, Egyptian painter (died 1956).
- January 19 – Hans Siebert von Heister, German painter (died 1967).
- February 22 – Horace Pippin, self-taught African-American painter (died 1946).
- March 12 - Eric Kennington, English sculptor and painter (died 1960).
- March 14 – Marc-Aurèle Fortin, Canadian painter (died 1970).
- March 19 – Josef Albers, German artist, mathematician and educator (died 1976).
- April 6 – Hans Richter, German painter, graphic artist, avant-gardist, film-experimenter and producer (died 1976).
- June – David Dougal Williams, English painter (died 1944).
- June 12 – Tom Purvis, English poster artist (died 1959).
- July 10 – Giorgio de Chirico, Greek-Italian painter (died 1978).
- August 13 – Gleb W. Derujinsky, Russian-American sculptor (died 1975).
- August 14 – Sydney Carline, English painter, war artist (died 1929).
- August 30 – Siri Derkert, Swedish artist, sculptor and political campaigner (died 1973).
- September 4 – Oskar Schlemmer, German sculptor, painter, designer and choreographer (died 1943).
- November 1 – George Kenner, German artist (died 1971)
- November 7 – Mariano Andreu, Spanish painter, enamelling master, sculptor and stage designer (died 1976).
- November 11 – Johannes Itten, Swiss colour theorist, painter and designer (died 1967).
- date unknown
  - Stanley Royle, English post-impressionist landscape painter (died 1961).

== Deaths ==
- January 13 – John William Inchbold, pre-Raphaelite painter (born 1830)
- January 29 – Edward Lear, painter, illustrator and humorous writer (born 1812)
- February 5 – Anton Mauve, painter (born 1838)
- March 15 – Léonard Morel-Ladeuil, goldsmith and sculptor (born 1820)
- May 30 – Louis Buvelot, Swiss-Australian painter (born 1814)
- June 18 – Luigi Mussini, painter (born 1813)
- July 31 – Frank Holl, painter (born 1845)
- August 23 – Philip Henry Gosse, naturalist and illustrator (born 1810)
- August 30 – George O'Brien, engineer and painter (born 1821)
- September 28 – Thomas Gambier Parry, artist and art collector (born 1816)
- October – Frank O'Meara, Irish painter (born 1853)
- November 20 – Nathaniel Currier, illustrator (born 1813)
- date unknown
  - Alexander Joseph Daiwaille, Dutch portrait painter (born 1818)
  - Nam Gye-u, Korean painter and government official (born 1811)
