= 1976 in art =

Events from the year 1976 in art.

== Events ==
- July–August – Articles by Geraldine Norman in The Times (London) expose a number of paintings attributed to Samuel Palmer as the work of Tom Keating, which he does not deny.
- Completion of the Cubist-influenced Church of the Holy Trinity, Vienna, by Fritz Wotruba.
- Collection de l'art brut ("Collection of outsider art") established in Lausanne, Switzerland.

== Awards ==
- Archibald Prize: Brett Whiteley – Self Portrait in the Studio
- John Moores Painting Prize - John Walker for "Juggernaut with plume - for P Neruda"

== Exhibitions ==
- 25 May – Opening of exhibition of color photography by William Eggleston at the Museum of Modern Art, New York.
- 21 July – Opening of P.S.1 Contemporary Art Center in Long Island City, New York. The inaugural exhibition Rooms presents in-situ works and installations by around 80 artists from the United States and abroad.
- 20 September until 21 November – "Two Centuries of Black American Art" curated by David Driskell at the Los Angeles County Museum of Art (LACMA) in Los Angeles, California - then traveled to; the High Museum of Art in Atlanta, Georgia (8 January 1977 – 20 February 1977), the Dallas Museum of Fine Arts in Dallas, Texas (30 March 30, 1977–15 May 1977), and the Brooklyn Museum (25 June 1977 – 21 August 1977).

== Works ==
- Vito Acconci – The Red Tapes
- Judy Baca and 400 community artists – Great Wall of Los Angeles (mural)
- Francis Bacon – Triptych
- Jennifer Bartlett – Rhapsody (completed)
- Pye Engström – Efter badet
- Christo and Jeanne Claude – "Running Fence" in Sonoma County and Marin County, California, United States
- Jimmy Carter Peanut Statue
- Nabil Kanso – Faust (paintings, 1976 through 1979)
- Bernard Kirschenbaum – Way Four
- R. B. Kitaj – From London
- Lee Krasner
  - Imperative
  - Imperfect Indicative
  - Past Continous
- Henry Moore – Three Piece Reclining Figure Draped (Massachusetts Institute of Technology)
- Susan Rothenberg – Butterfly
- Robert Ryman – Untitled (pastel and graphite on plexiglas with steel, 126 cm^{2})
- Douglas Senft – Awning (sculpture, Portland, Oregon)
- Jamie Wyeth – Portrait of Andy Warhol

== Films ==
- Blackwood

== Births ==
- 4 January – Shiro Amano, Japanese manga artist
- 27 January – Zoriah Miller, American photographer
- 13 February – Martin Sastre, Uruguayan media artist
- 3 April – Carl Hammoud, Swedish painter
- 30 April – Tomokazu Matsuyama, Japanese artist
- 10 June – Tai Shani, British artist

- Full date unknown -

- Donato Piccolo, Italian artist

== Deaths ==
=== January to March ===
- 1 February – Hans Richter, German painter, graphic artist, avant-gardist, film-experimenter and producer (b. 1888)
- 2 February – Zlatyu Boyadzhiev, Bulgarian painter (b. 1903)
- 12 February – Charles Jourdan, French fashion designer (b. 1883)
- 18 February – Wallace Berman, American painter and illustrator (b. 1926)
- 23 February – L. S. Lowry, English painter (b. 1887)
- February – Kate Lechmere, English painter associated with the Vorticists and milliner (b. 1887)
- 3 March – Pierre Molinier, French painter and photographer (b. 1900)
- 12 March – Jacques Carlu, French architect and designer (b. 1890)
- 22 March – John McLaughlin, American hard-edge painter (b. 1898)
- 25 March – Josef Albers, German artist, mathematician and educator (b. 1888)
- 31 March – Paul Strand, American photographer and filmmaker (b. 1890)

=== April to June ===
- 1 April – Max Ernst, German painter, sculptor, graphic artist, and poet (b. 1891).
- 22 April
  - Stanley Cursiter, Scottish painter and curator (b. 1887).
  - Jeanne Mammen, German painter (b. 1890)
- 24 April – Mark Tobey, American abstract expressionist painter (b. 1890)
- 11 May – Alvar Aalto, Finnish architect and designer (b. 1898)
- 28 May – Steffan Danielsen, Faroese painter (b. 1922)
- 24 June – Imogen Cunningham, American photographer (b. 1883)
- 27 June – Albert Dubout, French cartoonist, illustrator, painter, and sculptor (b. 1905)

=== July to December ===
- 5 July – Frank Bellamy, English comics artist (b. 1917)
- 24 July – Afro Basaldella, Italian painter (b. 1912)
- 16 September – Cecil Thomas, English bronze sculptor and medallist (b. 1885)
- 23 September – Anna Zinkeisen, British artist (b. 1901)
- 22 October - Edward Burra, British artist (b. 1905)
- 31 October – Eileen Gray, Irish furniture designer and architect (b. 1878)
- 11 November – Alexander Calder, American sculptor and multi media artist (b. 1898)
- 18 November – Man Ray, American artist and photographer (b. 1890)
- 11 December – Elmyr de Hory, Hungarian-born painter and art forger (b. 1906)
- 19 December – Giuseppe Caselli, Italian painter (b. 1893)
- 31 December – Sándor Bortnyik, Hungarian painter and graphic designer (b. 1893)

=== Full date unknown ===
- Mariano Andreu, Spanish painter, enamelling master, sculptor and stage designer (b. 1888)
- François Ozenda, French painter (b. 1923)

== See also ==
- 1976 in fine arts of the Soviet Union
