= 1967 in art =

Events from the year 1967 in art, including major exhibitions, artworks, and developments in the global art world.

== Events ==
- May 14 – Dedication of Liverpool Metropolitan Cathedral in England, designed by Frederick Gibberd, with stained glass by John Piper, Patrick Reyntiens and Margaret Traherne and a bronze crucifix by Elisabeth Frink.
- September 25 – Gilbert and George first meet while studying sculpture at St Martins School of Art in London.
- December 17 – 1967 Basel Picasso paintings purchase referendum: The people of Basel (Switzerland) vote to purchase two paintings by Picasso to retain them in the Kunstmuseum Basel.
- John Willett publishes Art in a City, a pioneering sociological study of art in a single city, Liverpool.
- Foundation of the Project Arts Centre, Dublin.
- The Maruki Gallery for the Hiroshima Panels is established in Higashimatsuyama, Saitama, Japan, as a permanent home for The Hiroshima Panels.

== Exhibitions ==
- February 28–May 7 – New Documents photography exhibition at the Museum of Modern Art, New York curated by John Szarkowski and featuring the work of Diane Arbus, Lee Friedlander and Garry Winogrand.
- September–October – Im Spazio ("The Space of Thoughts") at the Galleria La Bertesca, Genoa, Italy, curated by Germano Celant and introducing Arte Povera.

== Works ==
- Diane Arbus – Identical Twins, Roselle, New Jersey, 1967 (photograph)
- Francis Bacon – Portrait of Isabel Rawsthorne Standing in a Street in Soho
- Sargis Baghdasaryan – We Are Our Mountains (sculpture)
- Max Bill – Rhythm in Space (sculpture)
- Peter Blake with Jann Haworth – Sgt. Pepper's Lonely Hearts Club Band (collage for record album cover)
- Sir Anthony Caro - Prairie (sculpture)
- Salvador Dalí – Tuna Fishing
- Edward Delaney – Wolfe Tone (bronze statue)
- Jose de Rivera – Infinity (sculpture)
- Dušan Džamonja – Monument to the Revolution of the people of Moslavina
- Milton Glaser – Dylan (poster)
- Barbara Hepworth – Two Forms (Orkney) (slate sculpture)
- Eila Hiltunen – Sibelius Monument
- David Hockney – A Bigger Splash
- Richard Long – A Line Made by Walking (land art)
- Timothy Malone – Corten Steel Sculpture
- Joan Miró – The Caress of a Bird (sculpture)
- Henry Moore – sculptures
  - Nuclear Energy
  - Two-Piece Reclining Figure No. 9
- Barnett Newman
  - Broken Obelisk (sculpture - completed)
  - Voice of Fire (painting commissioned for Expo 67 in Montreal). April 28 – October 29 – Expo 67 takes place in Montreal, Canada, as part of the International and Universal Exposition, featuring major contributions in art, architecture, and design, and attracting over 50 million visitors.
- Isamu Noguchi – Sinai (sculpture)
- Pablo Picasso – Chicago Picasso (sculpture)
- Michelangelo Pistoletto – Venus of the Rags, (Assemblage - first version)
- Faith Ringgold – The American People Series #18: The Flag is Bleeding
- Faith Ringgold – The American People Series #20: Die
- Norman Rockwell – Russian Schoolroom
- Kenneth Snelson – Six Number Two (sculpture)
- Mark di Suvero – Are Years What? (for Marianne Moore) (sculpture)
- Yevgeny Vuchetich – The Motherland Calls (sculpture)
- Andy Warhol
  - Big Electric Chair
  - I, a Man (film)
- Steve Weaver – John Lennon's psychedelic Rolls-Royce
- James Wines – Three Bronze Discs (sculpture)
- David Wynne – Bird Fountains (Ambassador College, Pasadena, California)

== Births ==
- January 1 – Spencer Tunick, American photographer
- March 4 – Sam Taylor-Johnson, born Samantha Taylor-Wood, English-born film director, photographer and visual artist
- March 10 – Tim Pitsiulak, Inuk artist
- December 15 – David Černý, sculptor associated with Prague
- date unknown
  - Olafur Eliasson, Danish-Icelandic installation artist
  - Andy Taylor, Australian painter and printmaker

== Deaths ==
- January 8 – Josef Frank, Austrian-born Swedish architect and designer (born 1885)
- January 10 – Charles E. Burchfield, American landscape watercolorist (born 1893)
- January 15 – David Burliuk, Russian avant-garde artists (born 1882)
- January 28 – Ary Stillman, Russian-American representational and abstract painter (born 1891)
- January 31 – Oscar Fischinger, German born American animator, filmmaker and painter (born 1900)
- February 17 – Nancy Cox-McCormack, American portrait sculptor (born 1885)
- March 31 – Jefto Perić, Serbian painter (born 1895)
- April 15 – Veljko Stanojević, Serbian painter (born 1892)
- May 15
  - Edward Hopper, American painter and printmaker (born 1882)
  - Italo Mus, Italian painter (born 1892)
  - Jessie Traill, Australian printmaker (born 1881)
- May 27 – Johannes Itten, Swiss painter (born 1888)
- August 15 – René Magritte, Belgian surrealist painter (born 1898)
- August 30 – Ad Reinhardt, American abstract painter (born 1913)
- September 20 – Zinaida Serebriakova, Russian-born French painter (born 1884)
- October 27 – Marguerite Huré, French stained-glass artist (born 1895)
- November 21 – Vladimir Lebedev, Russian painter and graphic artist (born 1891)
- November 22 – Pavel Korin, Russian painter (born 1892)
- December 12 – Mac Raboy, American illustrator (born 1914)
- date unknown
  - Hans Siebert von Heister, German painter (born 1888)

== See also ==
- 1967 in fine arts of the Soviet Union
