= Badet =

Badet may refer to:

People

- Régina Badet (1876–1949), French comedic performer

Other

- Efter badet, 1976 sculpture by Pye Engström
