= Eugene J. Soligny =

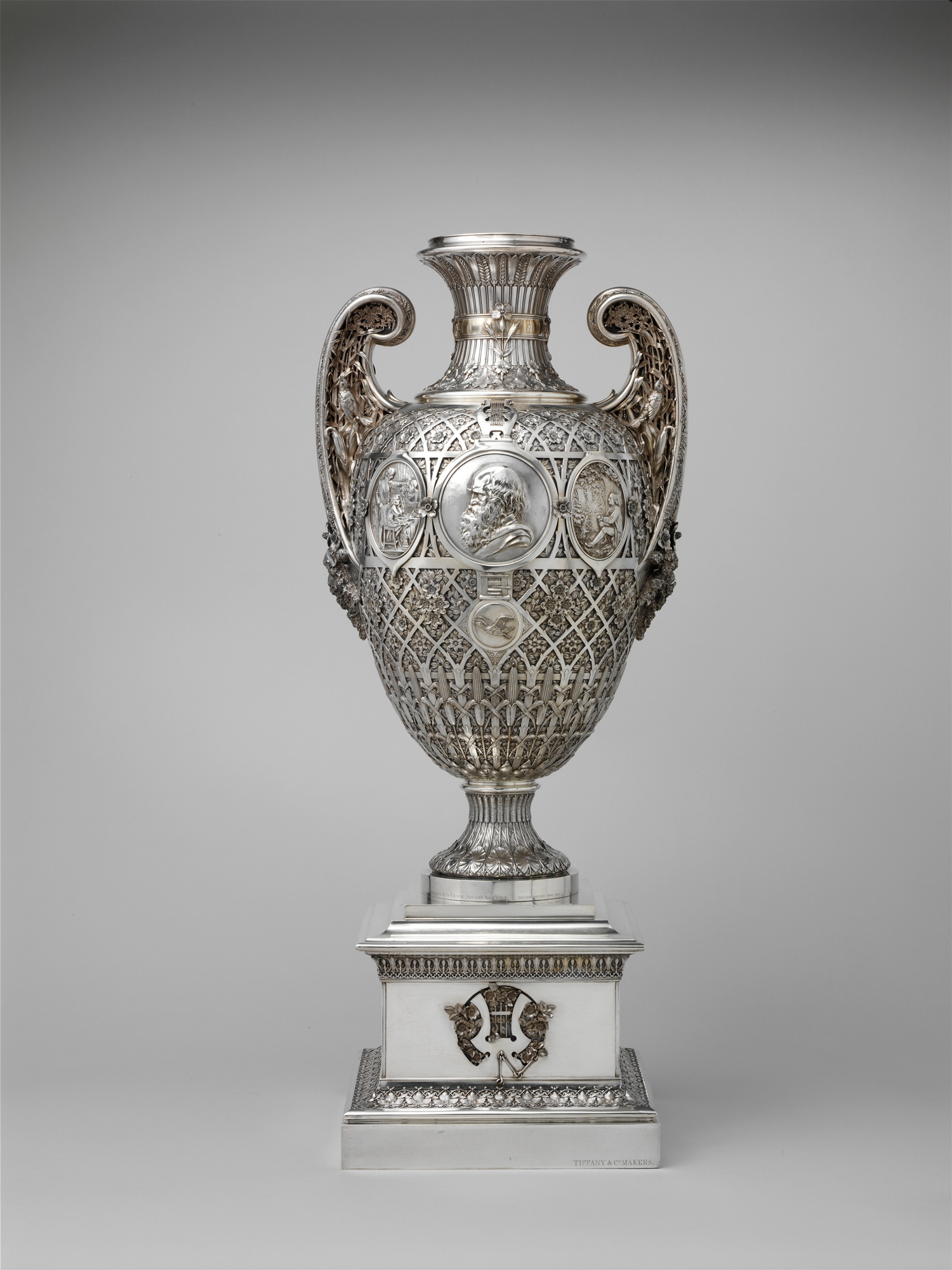
The Bryant Vase, by Eugene J. Soligny with medallions designed by Augustus Saint-Gaudens, 1875–76, made to honor William Cullen Bryant

Eugene Julius (Jules) Soligny (c. 1833 – January 10, 1901) was an American silversmith, best known for his repoussé and chasing work for Tiffany & Co. Soligny was born in Paris and studied with Léonard Morel-Ladeuil before emigrating to the U.S. in 1856. He was working for Tiffany by 1859, and by 1867 some of his Tiffany work is signed with his initials. He is credited with at least one US patent (173510 for embossing and chasing metal). His work is collected in the Art Institute of Chicago and Metropolitan Museum of Art.

== See also ==
- Bryant Vase
