= Bryant Vase =

19th-century silver vase

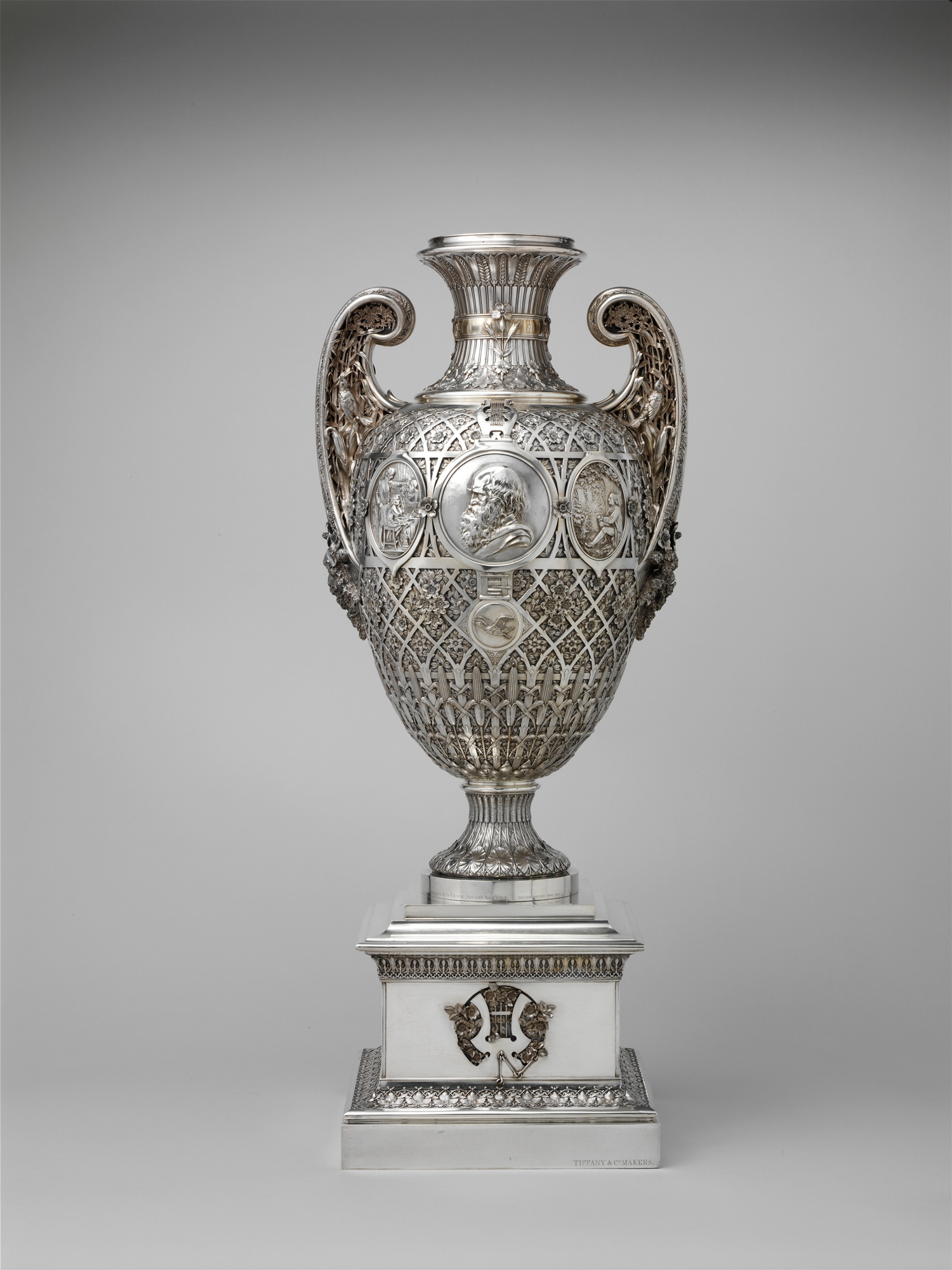
- Year: 1875–1876
- Medium: Silver
- Dimensions: 28.7 cm diameter (11 5/16 in)
- Weight: 14084.2 g
- Location: Metropolitan Museum of Art, New York

The Bryant Vase is a late 19th-century silver vase currently in the collection of the Metropolitan Museum of Art. It was manufactured by Tiffany & Co. in New York in 1875–1876 to honor William Cullen Bryant.

It was designed by James Horton Whitehouse and chased by Eugene J. Soligny, with medallions designed by Augustus Saint-Gaudens.

== Description ==
The vase was created in celebration of American poet William Cullen Bryant's 80th birthday in 1875. A group of Bryant's friends commissioned Tiffany & Co. to craft modern vase in the style of Greek vases. The new vase, done in silver, was then endowed with themes and motifs reflecting some of Bryant's poetry. To this end, the vase's fretwork depicts various plants, including stalks of corn, apple blossom, cattails, and water lilies. Elsewhere on the vase, silver medallions depict scenes from Bryant's life. On the neck of the vase the line "Truth crushed to earth shall rise again" – from Bryant's 1839 poem The Battlefield – is inscribed in gold.
