= Captive Andromache =

Painting by Frederic Leighton

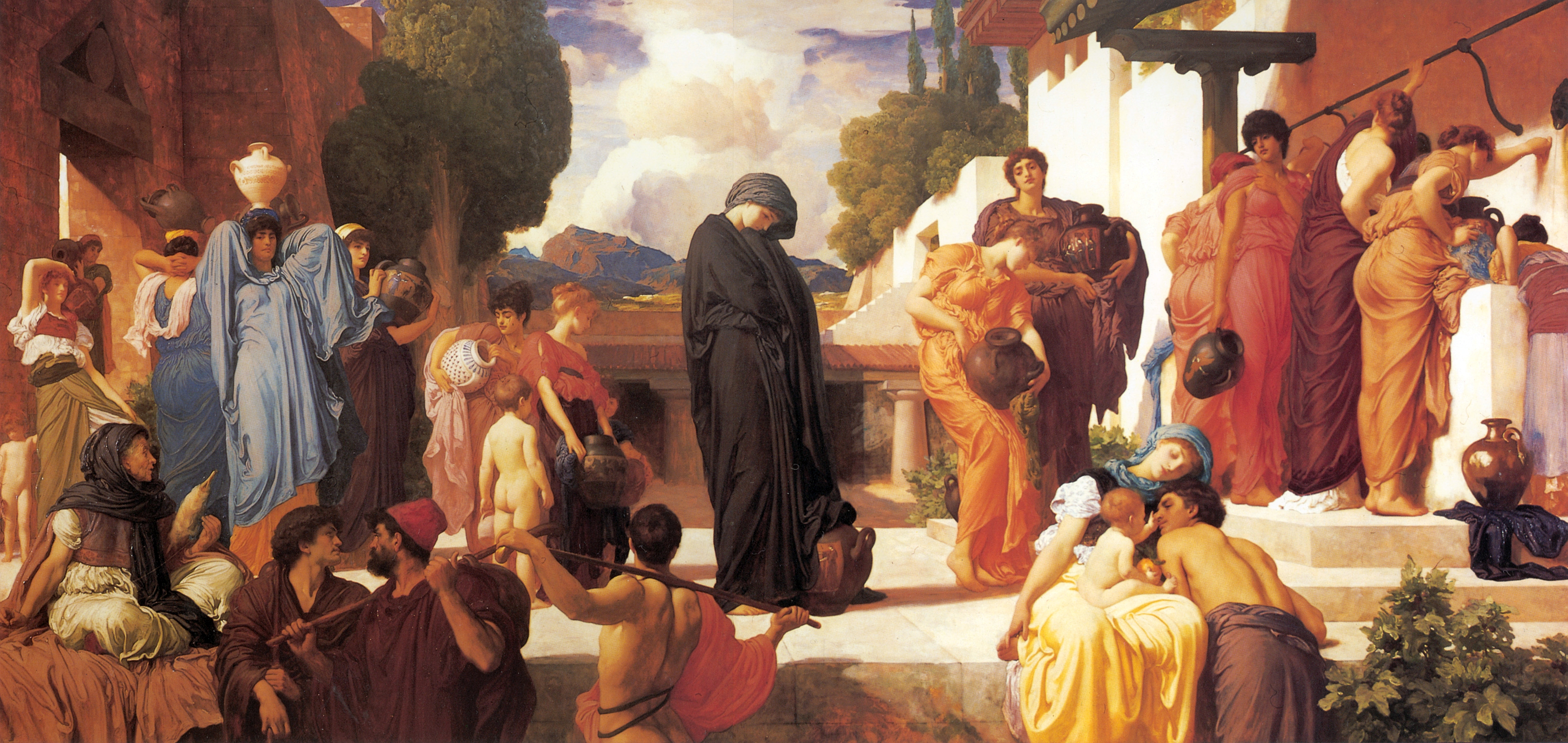
- Artist: Frederic Leighton
- Year: c. 1886-1888
- Medium: oil on canvas
- Dimensions: 197 cm × 407 cm (78 in × 160 in)
- Location: Manchester Art Gallery, Manchester, England

Captive Andromache is an oil painting on a 197 cm × 407 cm canvas by Frederic Leighton produced in ca. 1888. The subject is from Homer's Iliad. The painting was purchased by Manchester City Council for £4,000 from the artist in 1889. It now hangs in Manchester Art Gallery
