= Pye Engström =

Swedish sculptor (1928–2025)

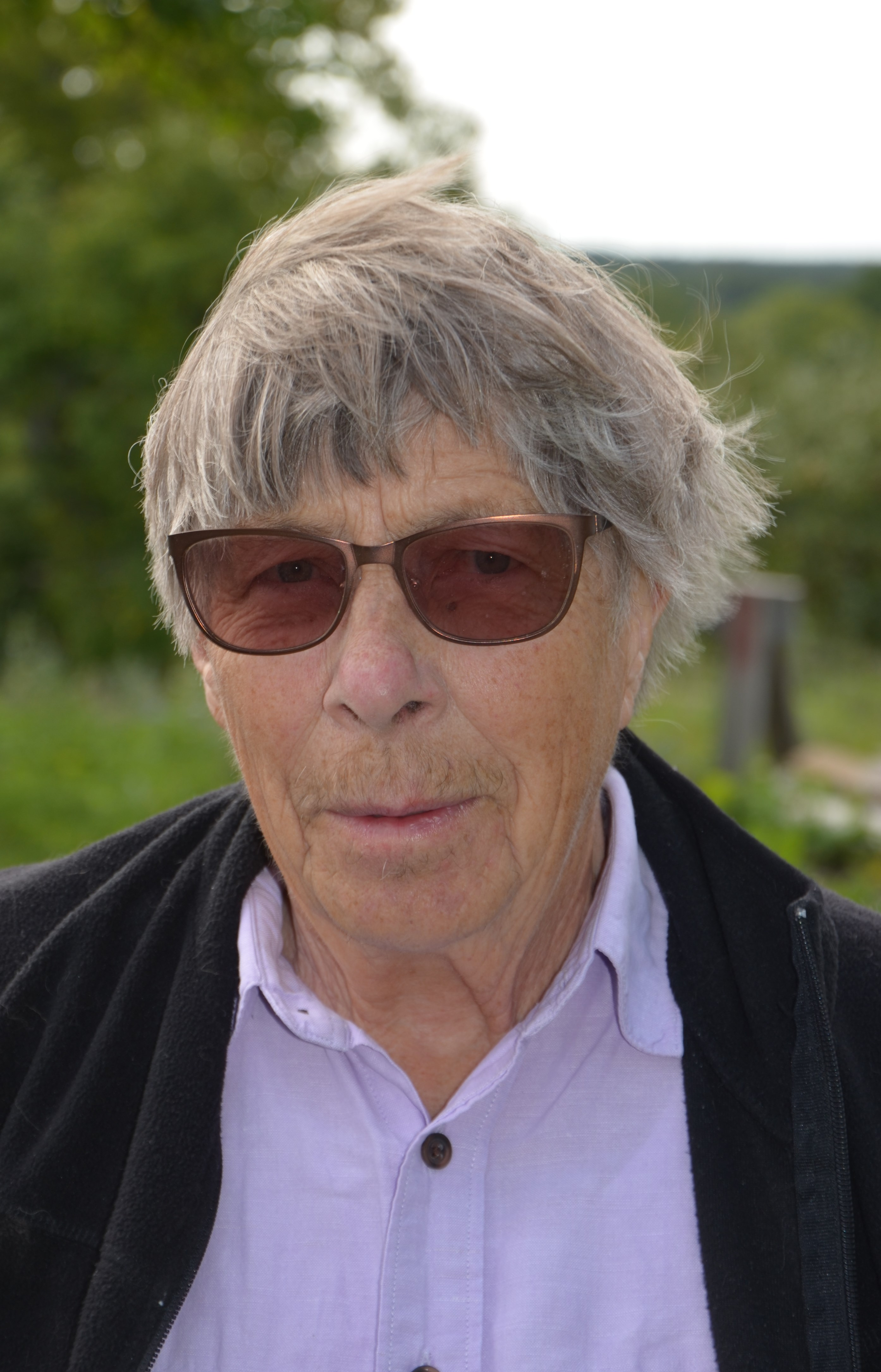
- Engström in 2013
- Born: Pye Ester Agneta Nanneson; 8 June 1928; Danderyd, Sweden
- Died: 7 October 2025 (aged 97)
- Other name: Pye Nanneson
- Education: Konstfack; Royal Institute of Art; Royal Danish Academy of Fine Arts
- Occupation: Sculptor
- Spouse: Clas Engström 1951–2017 (his death)

Pye Ester Agneta Engström (née Nanneson; 8 June 1928 – 7 October 2025) was a Swedish sculptor.

== Life and career ==
Born in Danderyd Municipality, Engström studied at the Konstfack (1945–48), the Royal Institute of Art (1945–48), and the Royal Danish Academy of Fine Arts (1948–53). She was married to writer Clas Engström (1927–2017) Engström died on 7 October 2025, at the age of 97.

== See also ==
- Efter badet (Stockholm)
