= Big Electric Chair =

1967 artwork by Andy Warhol

- Artist: Andy Warhol
- Year: 1967
- Type: Silk screen ink on synthetic polymer paint on canvas
- Dimensions: 137 cm × 185.4 cm (54 in × 73.0 in)
- Location: Froehlich Collection; Stuttgart

Big Electric Chair, created in 1967, is part of a series of works by Andy Warhol depicting an electric chair. Death by electrocution was a controversial subject in New York City, where the artist lived and worked, especially after the last two executions at Sing Sing Correctional Facility in 1963. Warhol obtained a photograph of the empty execution chamber, which became the basis for this series.
