= Portrait of Isabel Rawsthorne Standing in a Street in Soho =

1967 painting by Francis Bacon

- Isabel Rawsthorne Standing in a Street In Soho, 1967. Nationalgalerie, Staatliche Museen zu Berlin
- Year: 1967
- Location: Neue Nationalgalerie
- Owner: Marlborough Fine Art
- Accession no.: B 897

Portrait of Isabel Rawsthorne Standing in a Street in Soho is an oil-on-canvas painting by the British figurative artist Francis Bacon, from 1967. It is held in the collection of the Neue Nationalgalerie, in Berlin.

Described by art critic John Russell as one of Bacon's finest works, the painting depicts Isabel Rawsthorne, the painter, designer and occasional model for artists such as André Derain, Alberto Giacometti and Picasso.

== Context ==
Portrait of Isabel Rawsthorne, Photograph commissioned by Bacon. John Deakin, c.1966–67

Bacon met Rawsthorne in the late 1940s through Erica Brausen, who was exhibiting both artists in her Hanover Gallery in London. He portrayed Rawsthorne many times, including three large-scale canvases and three triptychs in the 1960s, as well as around 15 smaller portraits. Rawsthorne was regarded as extremely attractive with a striking face and formidable character. She fascinated Bacon and was perhaps the friend he respected most during the 1960s. According to his biographer Michael Peppiatt, "in her animal exuberance and the resolute sense of her individuality... she had a magnetism and mobility of expression that captivated Bacon". Although notably gay, in an interview soon after her death in January 1992, Bacon hinted that they had recently had an affair.

Bacon's 1960s paintings are characterised by closely modelled heads. By this time he was highly social, and liked to spend long nights with associates such as Lucian Freud (they later fell out, for unexplained reasons), Peter O'Toole, George Melly, Muriel Belcher, John Deakin and Henrietta Moraes. Belcher was a close friend, and the proprietor of the highly selective Colony Room in Dean Street, Soho.

== Description ==
The portrait is unusual for Bacon given that it has an outdoor setting while he was preoccupied throughout his career depicting figures in rooms. After the 1950s, and apart from his bullfight series, it is one of the few to place the subject outdoors. It is one of his few in which the subject seems aware and engaged with its surroundings. The other portraits that show a similarly outwards-looking figure are also of Rawsthorne.

== See also ==
- List of paintings by Francis Bacon

== Sources ==
- Farr, Dennis; Peppiatt, Michael; Yard, Sally (1999). Francis Bacon: A Retrospective. New York: Harry N. Abrams, Inc. ISBN 978-0-8109-2925-8.
- Peppiatt, Michael (1996). Anatomy of an Enigma. London: Westview Press. ISBN 978-0-8133-3520-9.
- Russell, John (1971). Francis Bacon (World of Art). New York: Norton. ISBN 978-0-500-20169-5.
- Sylvester, David (2000). Looking back at Francis Bacon. London: Thames and Hudson. ISBN 0500019940.
- Zweite, Armin (ed). (2006). The Violence of the Real. London: Thames and Hudson. ISBN 0-500-09335-0.
