= Léonard Morel-Ladeuil =

French sculptor (1820–1888)

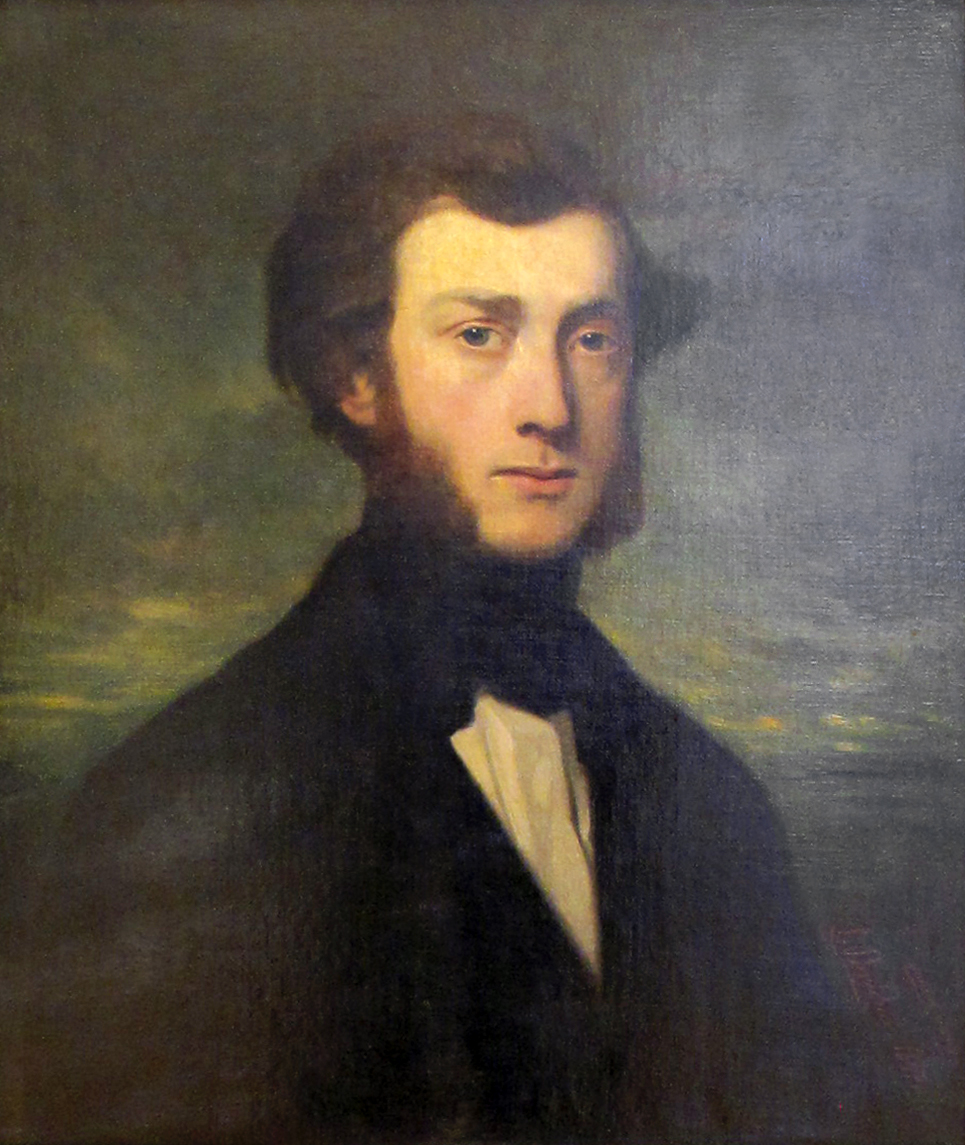
Léonard Morel-Ladeuil.

Léonard Morel-Ladeuil (1820 - 15 March 1888), French goldsmith and sculptor, was born at Clermont-Ferrand.

He was apprenticed first to Morel, a manufacturer of bronzes, under whom he became one of the most expert chasers, or ciseleurs, in France, and then to Antoine Vechte, to acquire the art of repoussé—the art in which he was to excel. He studied further under JJ Fuchre and then attracted the notice of the comte d'Orsay and the duc de Morny, through whose recommendation the French government, desirous of popularizing the idea of the new Imperialism, commissioned him to produce the Empire Shield.

Napoleon III notified his warm approval, but the trade, annoyed that a craftsman should obtain commissions direct, resented the innovation and thenceforward boycotted the young artist, whose beautiful and poetic vase, "Dance of the Willis" (the spirits dancing round the vase, above the lake represented on a dish below) none would take. He was encouraged~ nevertheless by a foreign dealer in Paris, Marché, who employed him on statuettes, mainly religious in character, until 1859, when Messrs Eikington, in view of the Great Exhibition of 1862, engaged him to work in Birmingham for three years in repoussé, assuring him a free hand.

Following his silver "Night came Day," and then the "Inventions" vase, which placed him at once at the top of his profession. This was followed by the beautiful plateau called "Dreams," which was subscribed for (£500) by Birmingham as the town wedding-gift to the prince and princess of Wales. Morel-Ladeuil's contract was then renewed for five years, but as a matter of fact he remained with the firm for twenty-three years at their London house, the first result being his masterpiece the "Milton Shield: Paradise Lost" (in repoussé steel and silver), which was the sensation of the Paris Exhibition. It was bought by the English government for £3000, and thousands of copies made by galvanoplastie or electrotype were sold and spread all over the world.

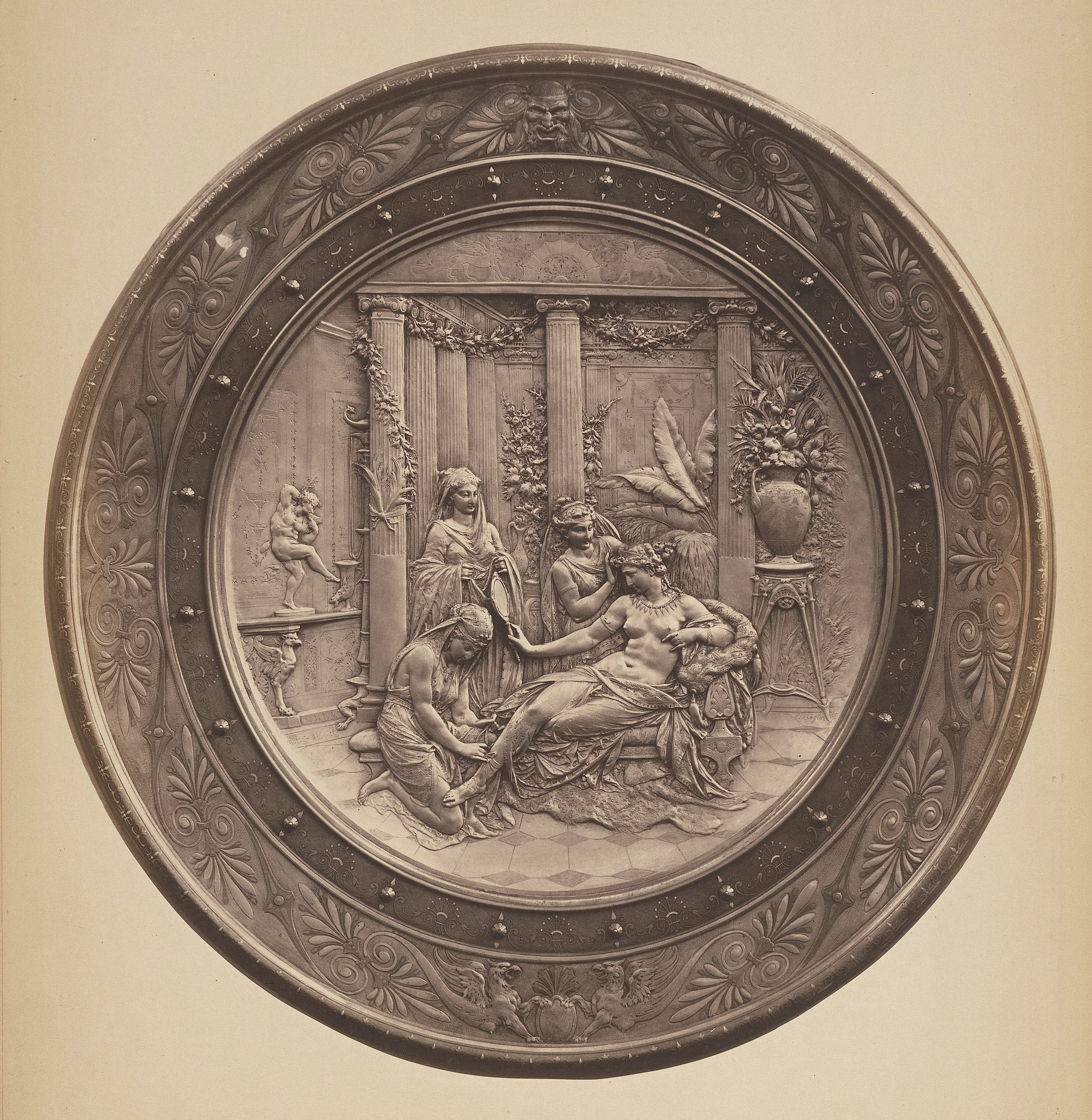
A Pompeian Lady at Her Toilette (1876)

Then after "The Months" came another masterpiece, the "Helicon Vase", in steel, silver, and gold, priced at oco, which in course of time was presented by the ladies and gentlemen of the royal house to Queen Victoria on her first jubilee. Decorated with gold damascening by the Spanish craftsman Plácido Zuloaga, it was described on its exhibition as "one of the greatest Art productions of the century". For the Philadelphia Exhibition (1876) Morel-Ladeuil produced "A Pompeian Lady at her Toilet," following it in 1878 with the "Bunyan Shield," a companion to the Milton. After putting forth his reliefs "The Merry Wives of Windsor," "The Merchant of Venice," and "Much Ado about Nothing," in view of his failing health he retired to Boulogne, where he died of angina pectoris on 15 March 1888. He was buried with much ceremony at Clermont-Ferrand.

His total work, apart from the productions of his youth, numbers 35 pieces, which richly reveal his elegant and refined fancy and grace, his feeling for correct and dainty ornament, and his love of pure art marked by an elevated if rather sentimental taste and a noble style. The celebrated Tiffany silversmith Eugene J. Soligny was one of his students.
