= Donato Piccolo =

Italian mixed media visual artist

Donato Piccolo (Born 1976 in Rome, Italy) is an Italian mixed media visual artist whose work often questions advanced machine and computer technology and furthermore, AI. In 2023, he was part of a two-person exhibition with Luca Vitone titled Landscape at the Museum of Rome - Palazzo Braschi. The show was part of the Quotidana cycle at the museum.

Piccolo is represented by Galerie Italienne in Paris and Gallerie Mazzoli in Berlin .

Piccolo's work was included in the exhibition All Masters at the Palazzo del Vignola in Bologna. Piccolo has also engaged in performance art such as his 2014 Spiderman project at the MACRO Museum in Rome in 2014. In 2017, he had a solo exhibition at the Youth Centre of The Hermitage in St. Petersburg, Russia titled Thinking the Unthinkable.
