= Landscape, Branchville =

Painting by John Henry Twachtman

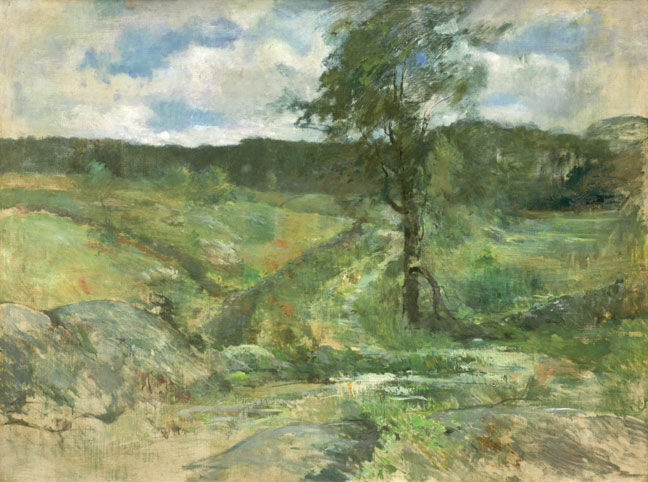
- Artist: John Henry Twachtman
- Year: c. 1888
- Medium: Oil on canvas
- Dimensions: 152.4 cm × 203.2 cm (60 in × 80 in)

Landscape, Branchville (also Branchville Lane or Branchville) is an oil on canvas painting by John Henry Twachtman. Painted c. 1888, it is Twachtman's largest known work, and was painted in front of the home of his friend J. Alden Weir.

== Background ==
Close friends, Twachtman and Weir were members of The Society of American Artists, the Tile Club, and the Ten American Painters, and were instructors at the Art Students League of New York. Twachtman was best man at Weir's wedding, and named his son "Alden" after Weir's middle name. A frequent guest at Weir's farm in Branchville, Connecticut, in the southeast corner of Ridgefield, Connecticut, Twachtman rented a home nearby in the summer of 1888 to work alongside Weir. Of painting in the country Twachtman wrote Weir: "I feel more and more contented with the isolation of country life. To be isolated is a fine thing and we are then nearer to nature".

Working together in Branchville, Twachtman and Weir sought to bring the lightness of touch of their watercolors and pastels to oil painting; the import of their experiments was recognized by critics when they exhibited in New York the following winter.

Landscape, Branchville was painted three years after Arques-la-Bataille, the only other canvas by Twachtman of similar size. However, whereas the earlier canvas was painted with the intention of exhibiting at the Paris Salon, Twachtman's rationale for the scale of Landscape, Branchville is not known. The paintings are exceptional within Twachtman's ouvre: but for a few canvases that extend to 40 or 50 inches in width, most of his notable paintings are less than 30 inches wide.

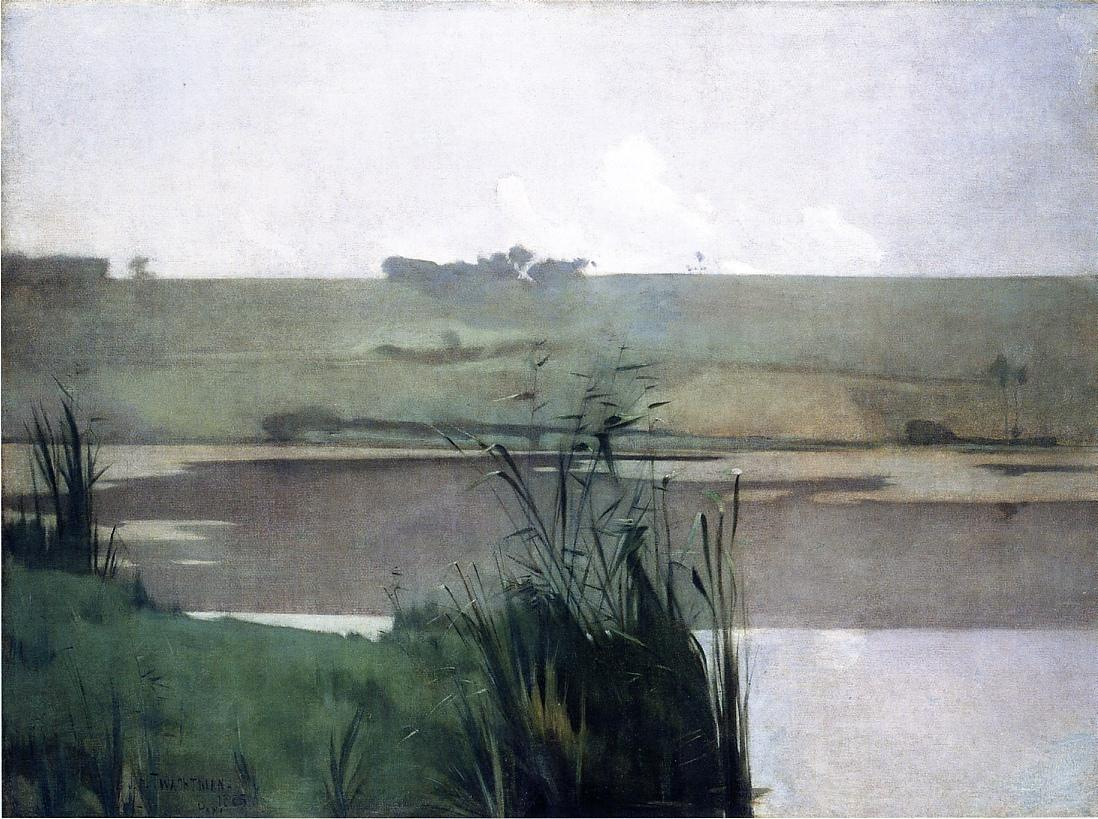
Arques-la-Bataille, Metropolitan Museum of Art, the only other painting by Twachtman of similar scale.

== Description ==
The same height and just one inch wider than Arques-la-Bataille, Landscape, Branchville is a work of vastly different effect, and represents a transitional moment in Twachtman's career. Instead of a consciously formal and carefully arranged composition— Arques-la-Bataille was painted in the studio from sketches— Branchville is characterized by a vigorous spontaneity that suggests plein-air painting. Rather than choosing a subject of natural grandeur for large-scale treatment, as had painters of the Hudson River School, Twachtman painted an apparently unremarkable and intimate view.

Landscape, Branchville depicts the landscape, looking to the west, from the front door of Weir's home. Sky comprises the upper third of the painting, with the land carved into diagonals by a winding path. A large tree to the right of center, extending to the top of the canvas, is the sole vertical stanchion. Composed of patches of green and reddish ocher, the ground plane is loosely painted, with the undertone of the canvas showing through toward the bottom of the canvas. The handling gibes with Twachtman's prioritization of breadth over detail. It may also reflect an increasing interest in French Impressionism, examples of which had been exhibited in New York in 1886.

The forms of a similar composition in pastel entitled Tree by a Road (Cincinnati Art Museum), have been further distilled, and may have been painted after the oil.

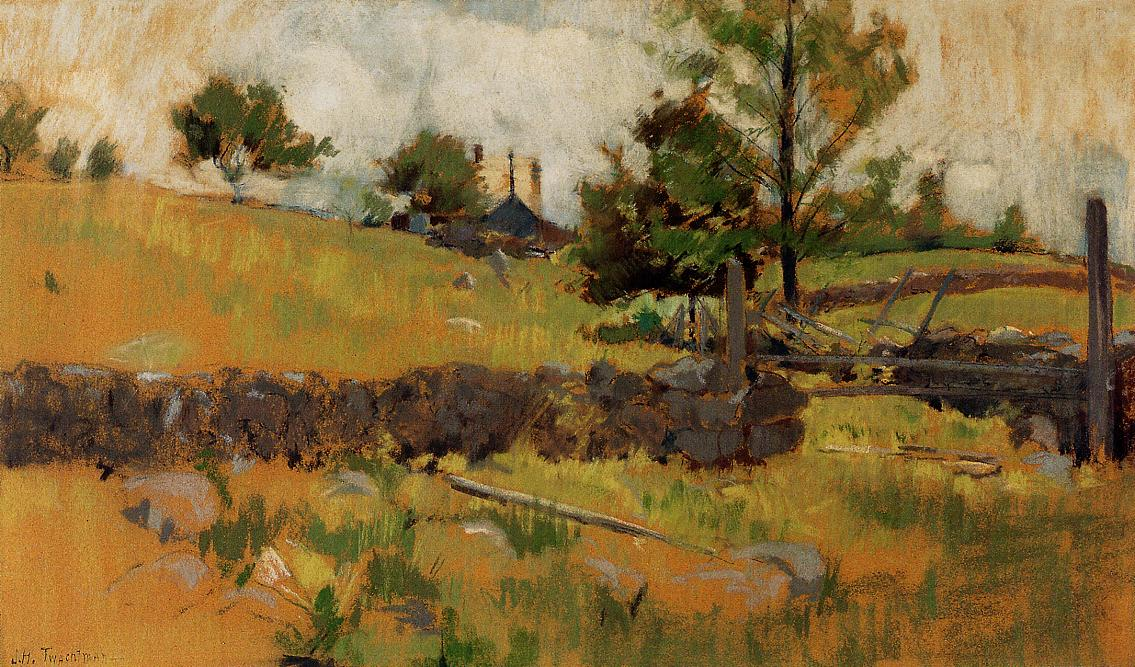
Spring Landscape, c. 1888, pastel on paper. Huntington Museum of Art. One of numerous pastels Twachtman made in Branchville, and closely related to the etching Branchville Fields.

== Provenance ==
Ownership of the painting went from Twachtman to Weir, who once told an art collector "I would sooner lose my right arm than sell one of Johnnie Twachtman's paintings!" By 1957 it was in the possession of Twachtman's son Alden, and in 1968 was bought by Harry Spiro. In 1979 Landscape, Branchville was given to the Columbus Museum of Art, which deaccessioned the painting in 2004.
