= Saintes-Maries (Van Gogh series) =

Painting series by Vincent van Gogh

In the pictography of Vincent van Gogh (1853–1890), the French town of Saintes-Maries-de-la-Mer is the subject of various seascape and landscape paintings, which the artist painted during a week-long holiday to the coastal town of Saintes-Maries-de-la-Mer on the Mediterranean Sea, in the summer of 1888.

As post-impressionist art, the experimental techniques of artwork (brushstroke and colour) in the Saintes-Maries-de-la-Mer paintings yielded a painterly style more expressive than the style of painting in Van Gogh's early-period paintings. The coastal holiday yielded for Van Gogh nine drawings and two paintings — a Mediterranean seascape and a landscape of the fishing village.

== Saintes-Maries-de-la-Mer ==
In effort to recover his health from chronic illness and to find subjects to paint, Vincent Van Gogh took a seaside holiday in the Camargue region of southern France, at the fishing village of Saintes-Maries-de-la-Mer, and lodged at the Pension Coulomb, near the village's beach on the Mediterranean Sea.

In a letter to his art-dealer brother Theo, the painter Vincent van Gogh described the village: “The beach here is sandy, no cliffs or rocks — like Holland — without the dunes and with more [colour] blue”, and the food, the villagers and the fishermen, and the coastal geography. “I don’t believe there are one hundred houses in this village. The main building, after the old church, an ancient fortress, is the barracks.”

== Seascape paintings ==
=== Fishing Boats on the Beach at Saintes-Maries-de-la-Mer ===
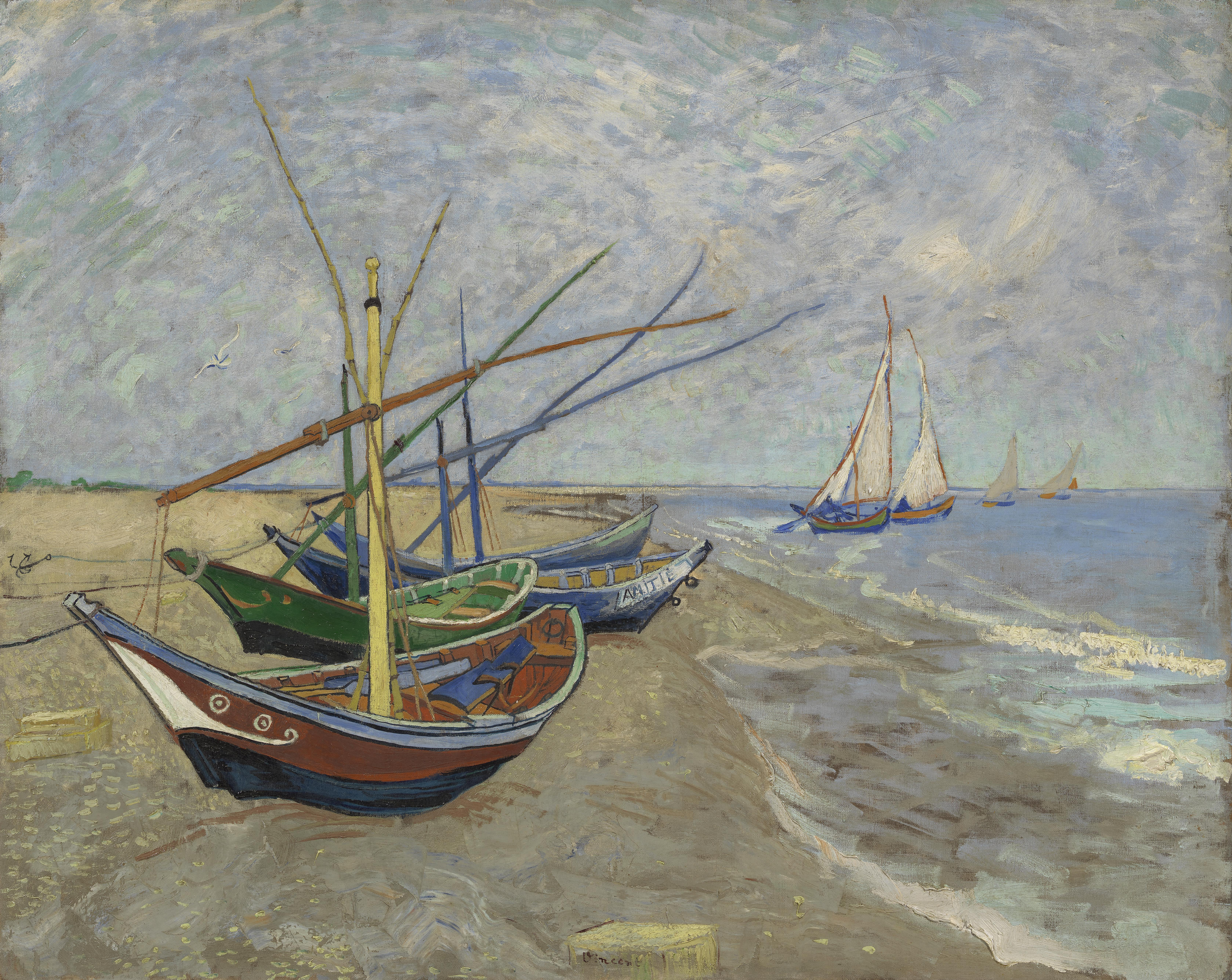
Fishing Boats on the Beach at Saintes-Maries (1888), by Vincent van Gogh. Van Gogh Museum, Amsterdam, Netherlands. (F413)

At the village, Van Gogh painted Fishing Boats on the Beach at Saintes-Maries-de-la-Mer (F413), which he described in correspondence with Theo: “I made the drawing of the boats when I left very early in the morning, and I am now working on a painting based on it, a size 30 canvas with more sea and sky on the right. It was before the boats hastened out; I had watched them every morning, but as they leave very early I didn't have time to paint them.” Upon completing the preliminaries of the painting at the beach, in studio, Van Gogh completed the details of the seaside picture, such as the varieties of light in the sand, in the sea and in the sky.

=== The Sea at Les Saintes-Maries-de-la-Mer ===
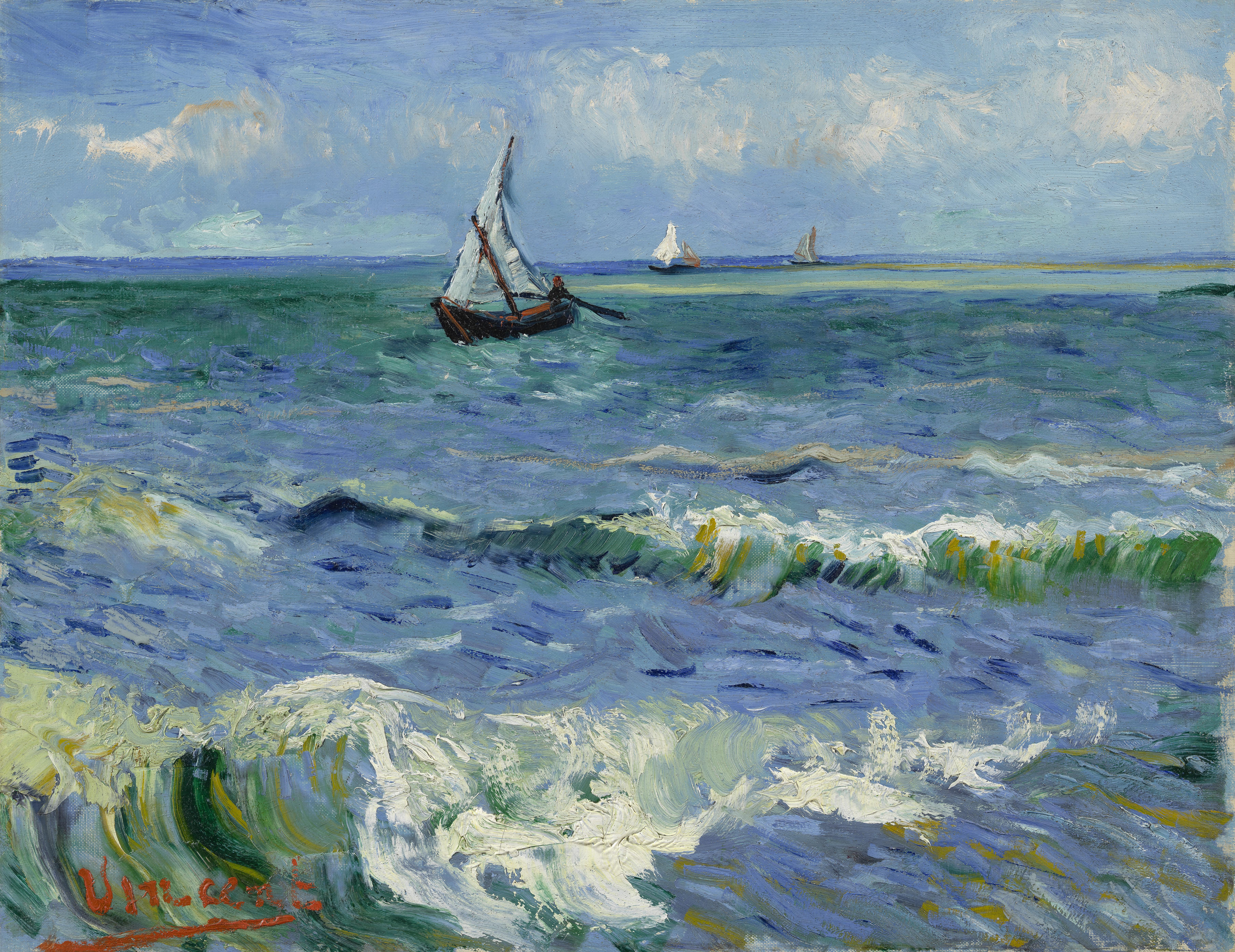
The Sea at Les Saintes-Maries-de-la-Mer, 1888, Van Gogh Museum, Amsterdam (F415)

The painting of The Sea at Les Saintes-Maries-de-la-Mer (F415) depicts three boats sailing a calm sea, and in the foreground sailboat, a fisherman is visible navigating the boat. The depth-of-field is achieved with light and colour, thus, the tall horizon of the picture emphasises the vastness of the Mediterranean Sea, which is depicted in varied shades of blue and shades of green that emphasise the depth of the sea, against which background stands out the white-colour sails of the three sailboats. The horizon shows a calm sea, whilst the foreground lines of swirling, white-capped turbulent water allude to the Japanese painting The Great Wave off Kanagawa (1831)

The different shades of color Van Gogh used to depict the sea capture light’s interactions with water. He wrote that the "Mediterranean Sea is a mackerel color: in other words, changeable – you do not always know whether it is green or purple, you do not always know if it is blue, as the next moment the ever-changing sheen has assumed a pink or a gray tint." To contrast with the color of the water, Van Gogh signed his name in large red letters.

The scene is painted with thick impasto, emphasizing the tumultuous waves and uneven sea. To achieve this effect, Van Gogh squeezed paint directly onto the canvas and created texture using his palette knife rather than a traditional brush. This is most visible in the crest of the waves crashing in the painting's foreground. Unlike Fishing Boats on the Beach at Saintes-Maries-de-la-Mer, which was painted in a studio, this work was likely created on the beach en plein air, as is indicated by grains of sand that have been found embedded in the paint.

Weeks after completing the painting, Van Gogh referred to boats in the ocean as a metaphor in a letter to his brother, Theo. Van Gogh wrote that artists like himself were "sailing on the high seas in our small and wretched boats, isolated on the great waves of time."

=== Fishing Boats at Saintes-Maries-de-la-Mer ===
Fishing Boats at Saintes-Maries-de-la-Mer (F1433) is one of Van Gogh's reed pen drawings of Saint-Maries and the inspiration for The Sea at Les Saintes-Maries-de-la-Mer (F415). The fluid movements of Van Gogh's pen bring an energy to the drawing, not intended to be a mimetic copy. Both his choice of the reed pen and the "placement of tiered-patterned strokes" reflect the influence of Japanese prints. The Pointillist dotted sky accentuates the clouds. Vertical lines evoke whitecaps, and horizontal lines portray the calmer sea in the distance.

=== Seascape at Saintes-Maries (Fishing Boats at Sea) ===
In Seascape at Saintes-Maries (Fishing Boats at Sea) (F417), the combination of a high horizon and boats close to the top of the frame draw the audience in to the choppy sea in the foreground and center of the picture. Van Gogh also made three drawings of this composition.

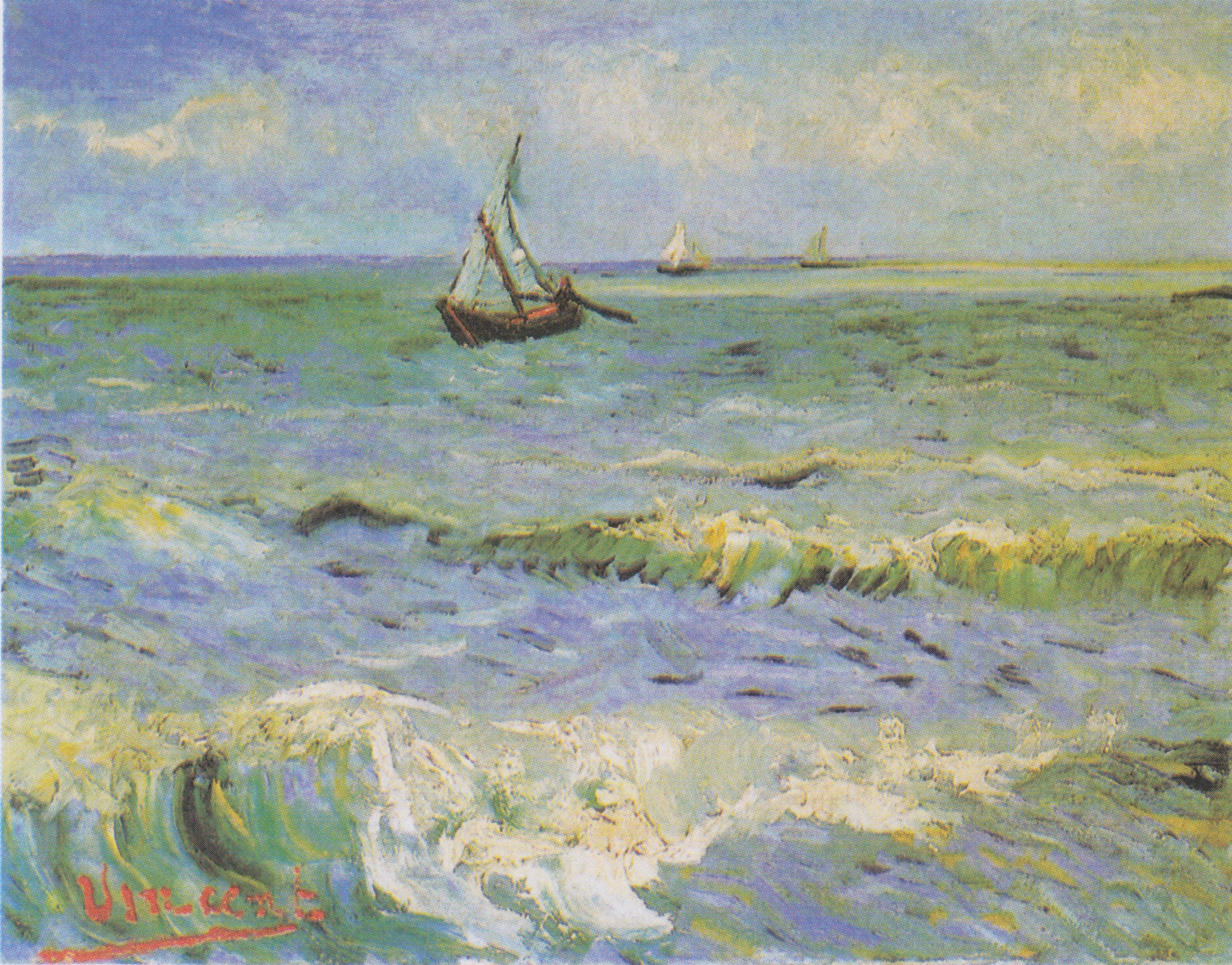
The Sea at Les Saintes-Maries-de-la-Mer, 1888, Van Gogh Museum, Amsterdam (F415)

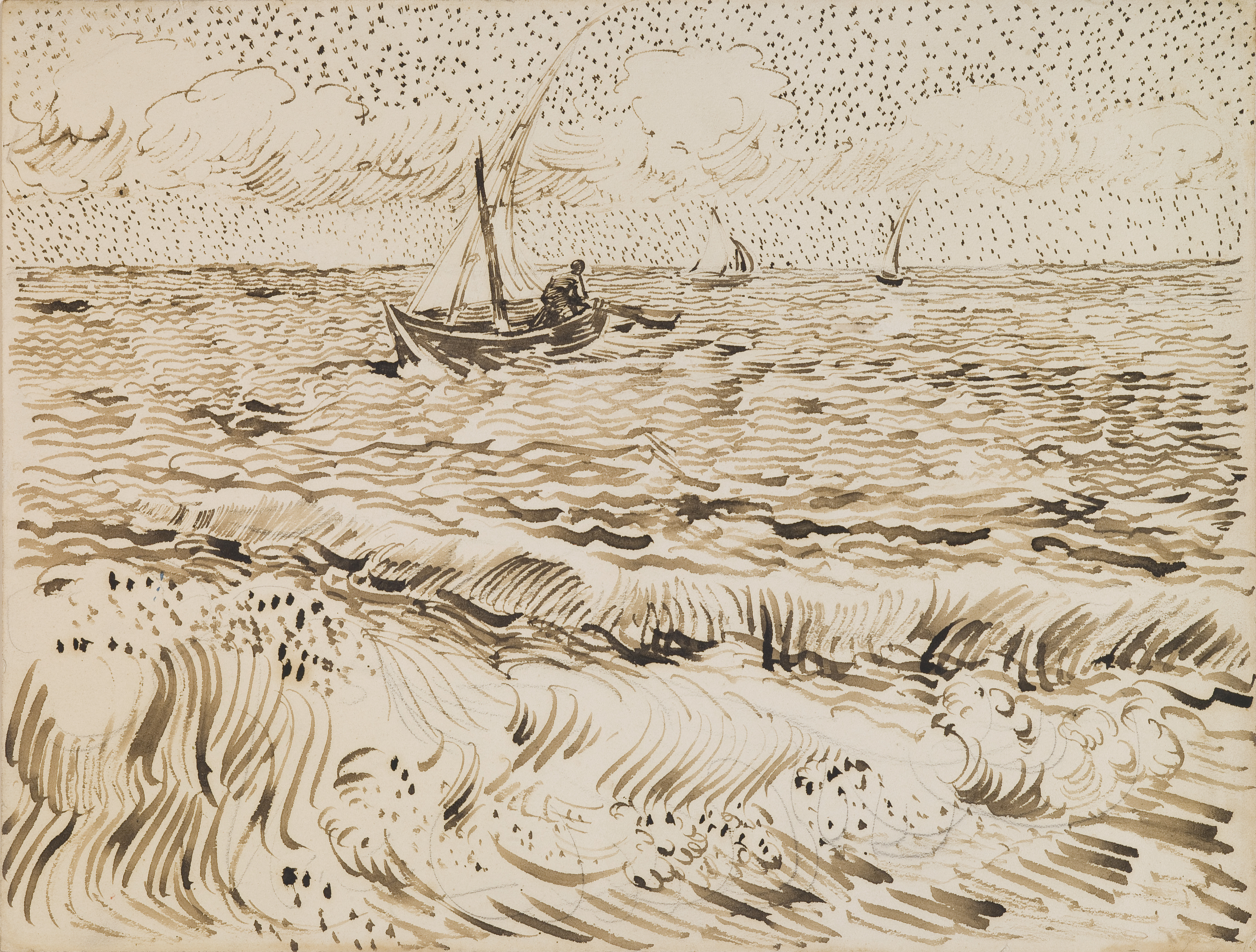
Fishing Boats at Saintes-Maries-de-la-Mer, Pen and ink and pencil, June 1888, St. Louis Museum of Art (F1433)

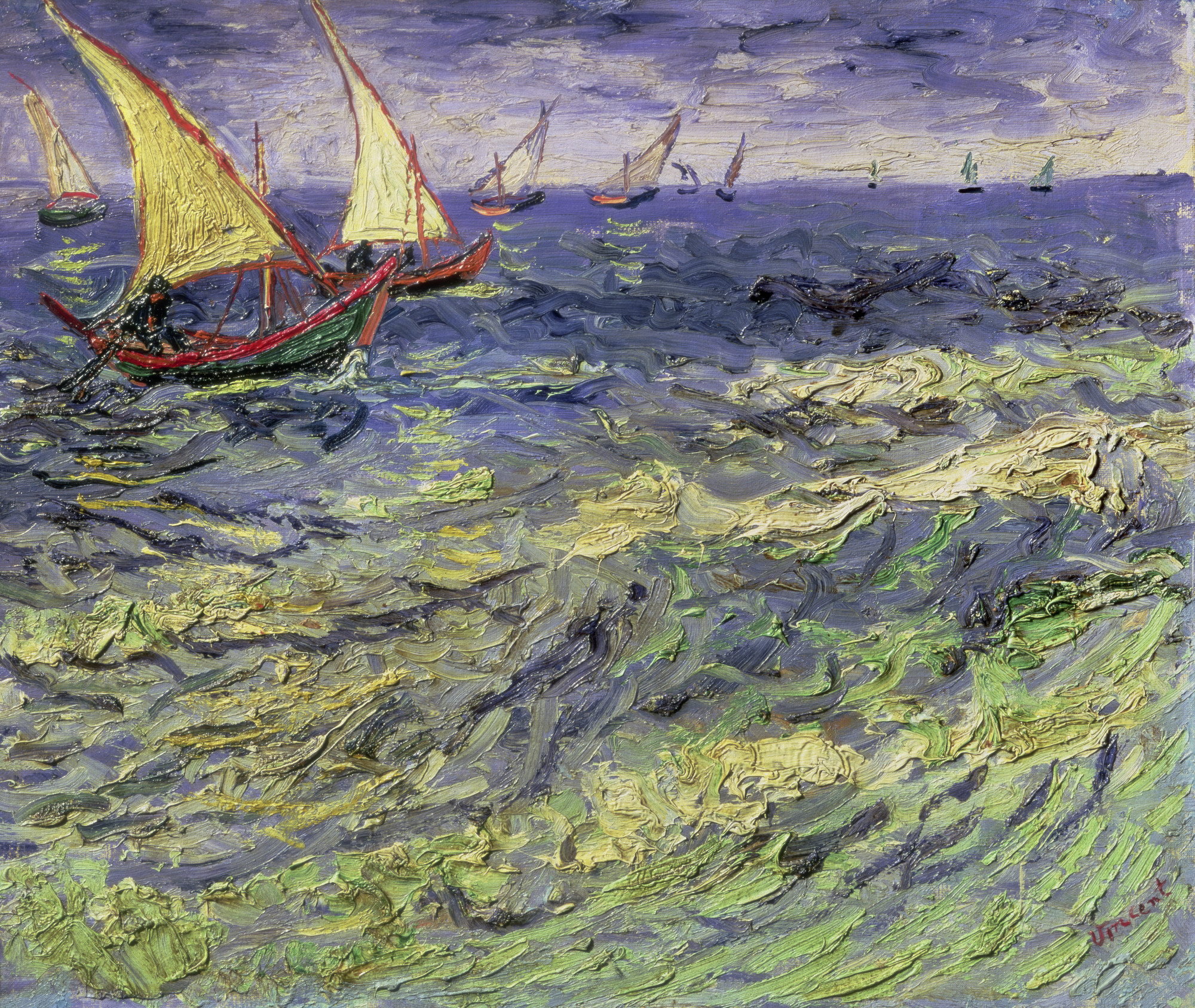
Seascape at Saintes-Maries (Fishing Boats at Sea), 1888, Pushkin Museum, Moscow, Russia (F417)

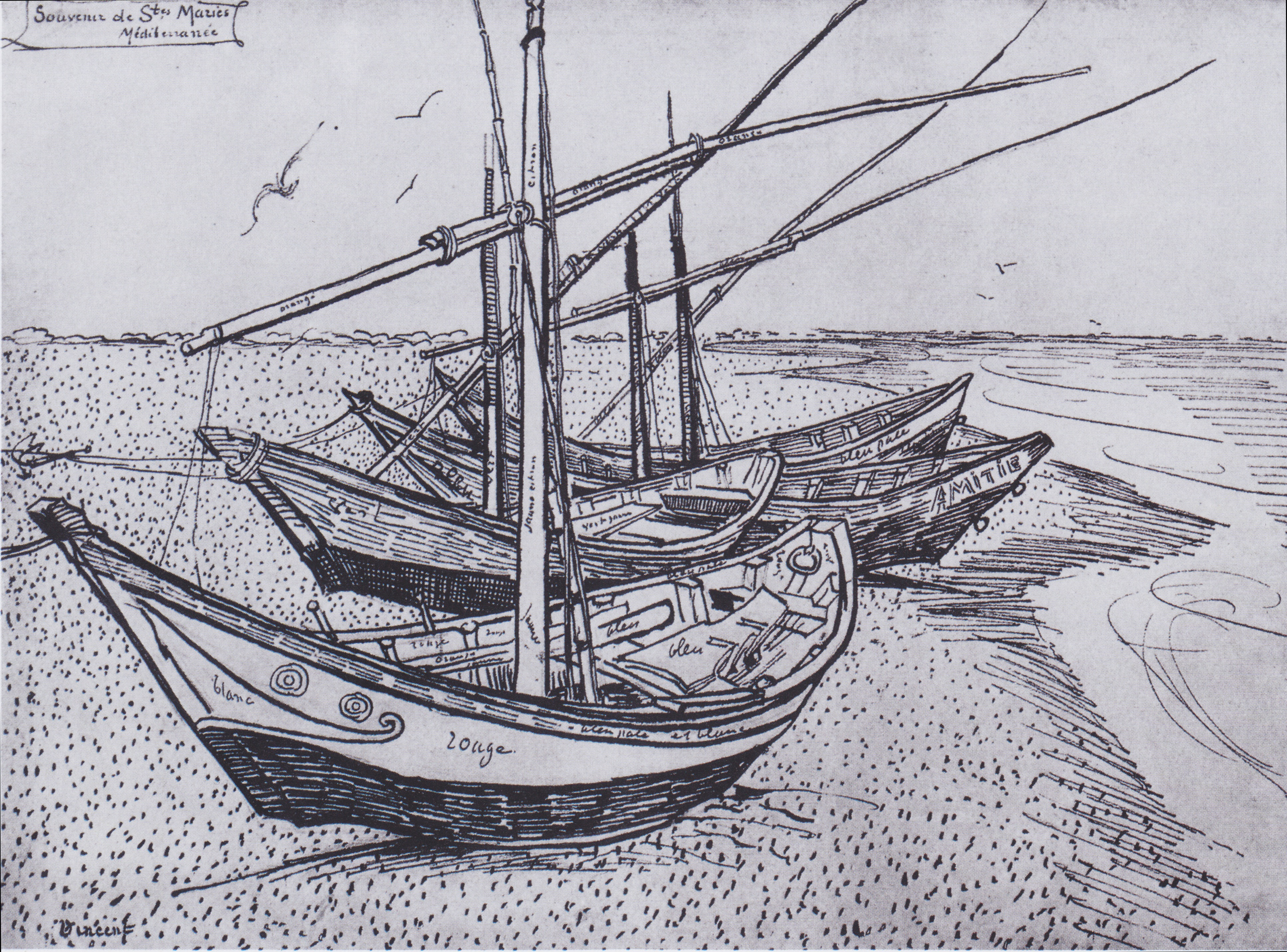
Fishing Boats on the Beach at Saintes-Maries, Reed pen, 1888, Private collection (F1428)

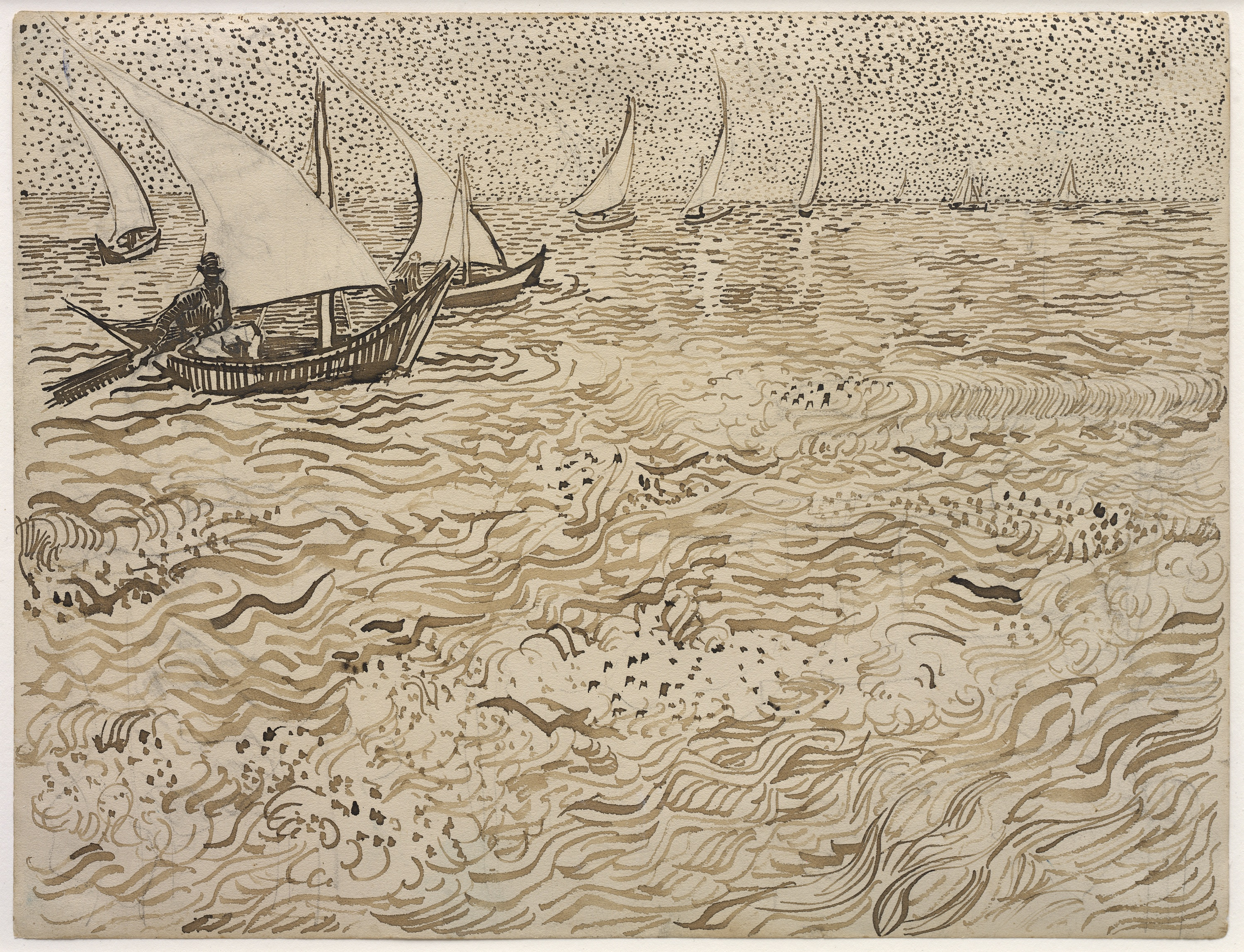
Boats at Saintes-Maries, Reed pen and ink over graphite on wove paper, Late July-early August 1888, Solomon R. Guggenheim Museum

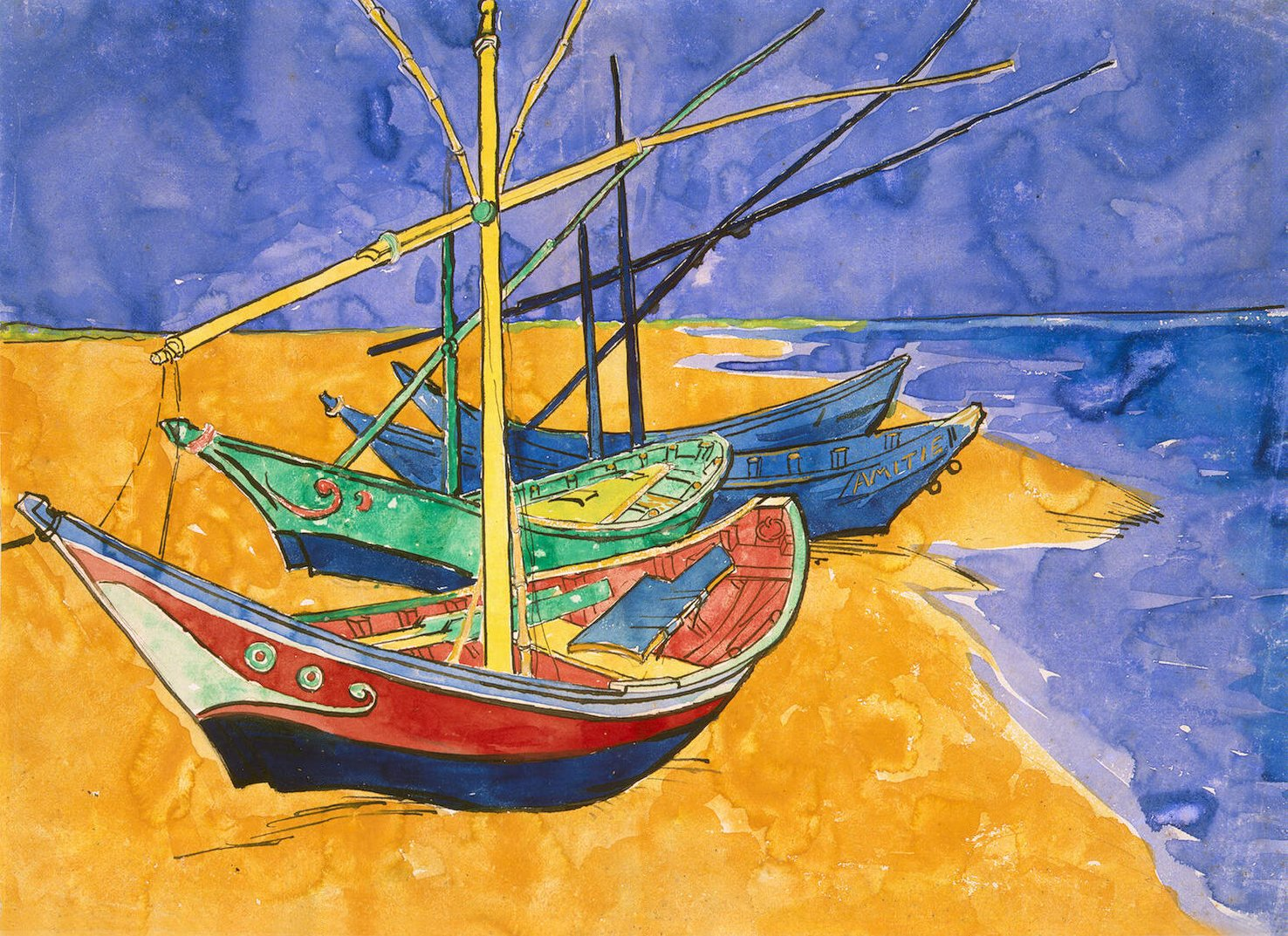
Fishing Boats on the Beach at Saintes-Maries, watercolor, 1888, Hermitage Museum, private collection (F1429)

== Paintings of the town ==
In the painting View of Saintes-Maries (F416), Van Gogh painted rows of what is likely lavender spanning from the painting's foreground to the town of Saintes-Maries in the center of the frame. This use of perspective serves to draw the viewer into the painting. A wall encloses the town, with a large church serving the painting's focal point. The painting takes on a three-dimensional appearance, starting with relief-like layers of blue paint in the sky. Van Gogh used finer brushstrokes on the field and town buildings.

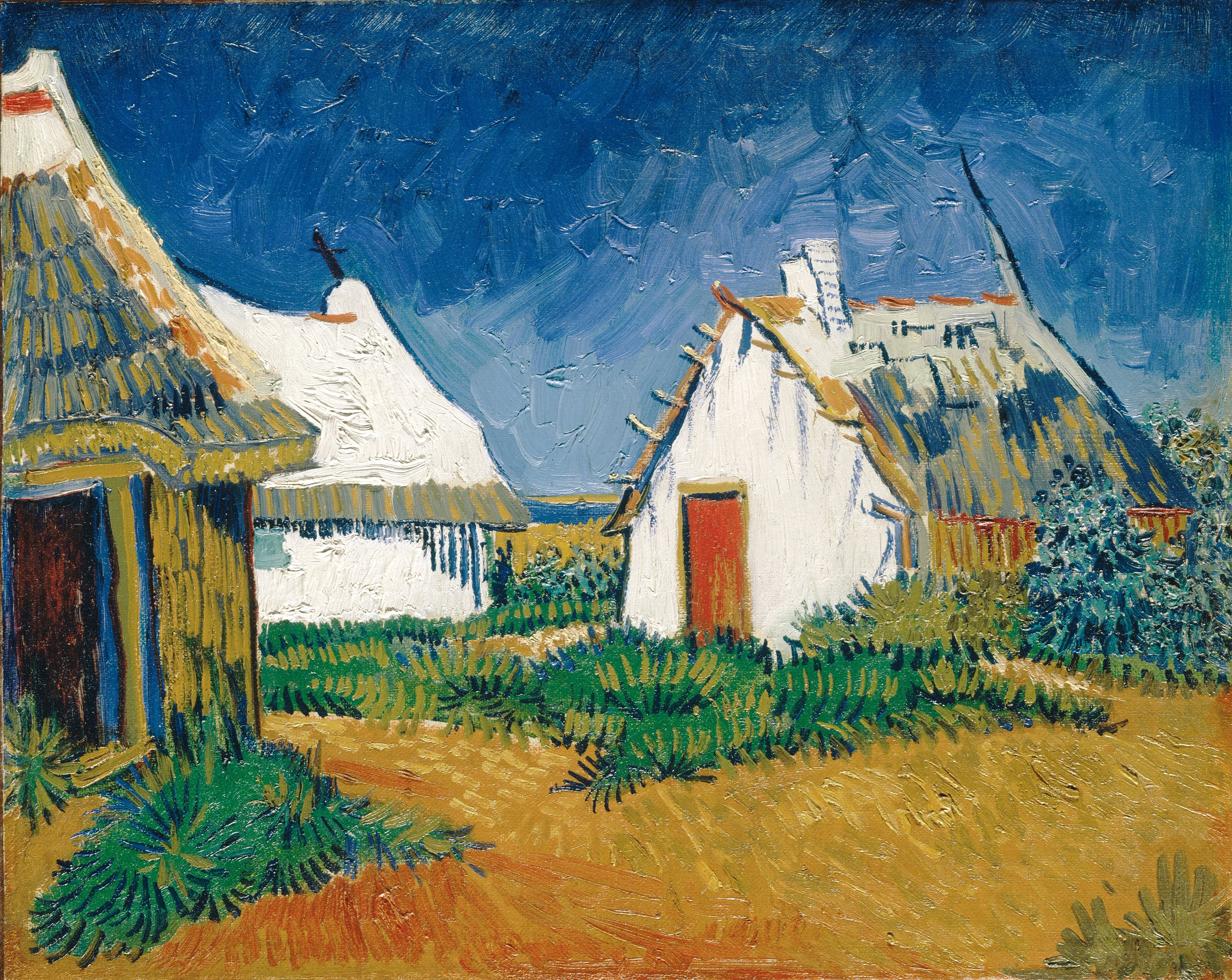
Three White Cottages in Saintes-Maries, 1888, Kunsthaus Zürich (F419)

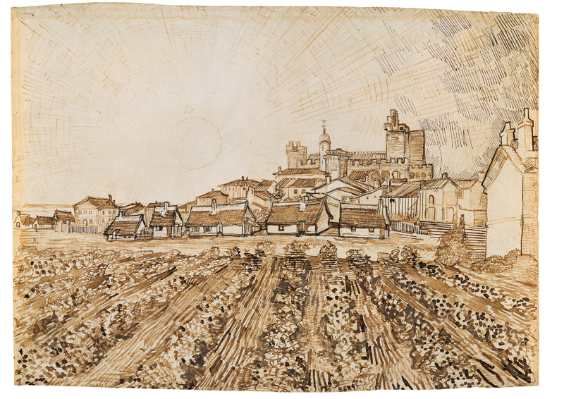
Les Saintes-Maries-de-la-Mer, 1888, Am Römerholz, online collection

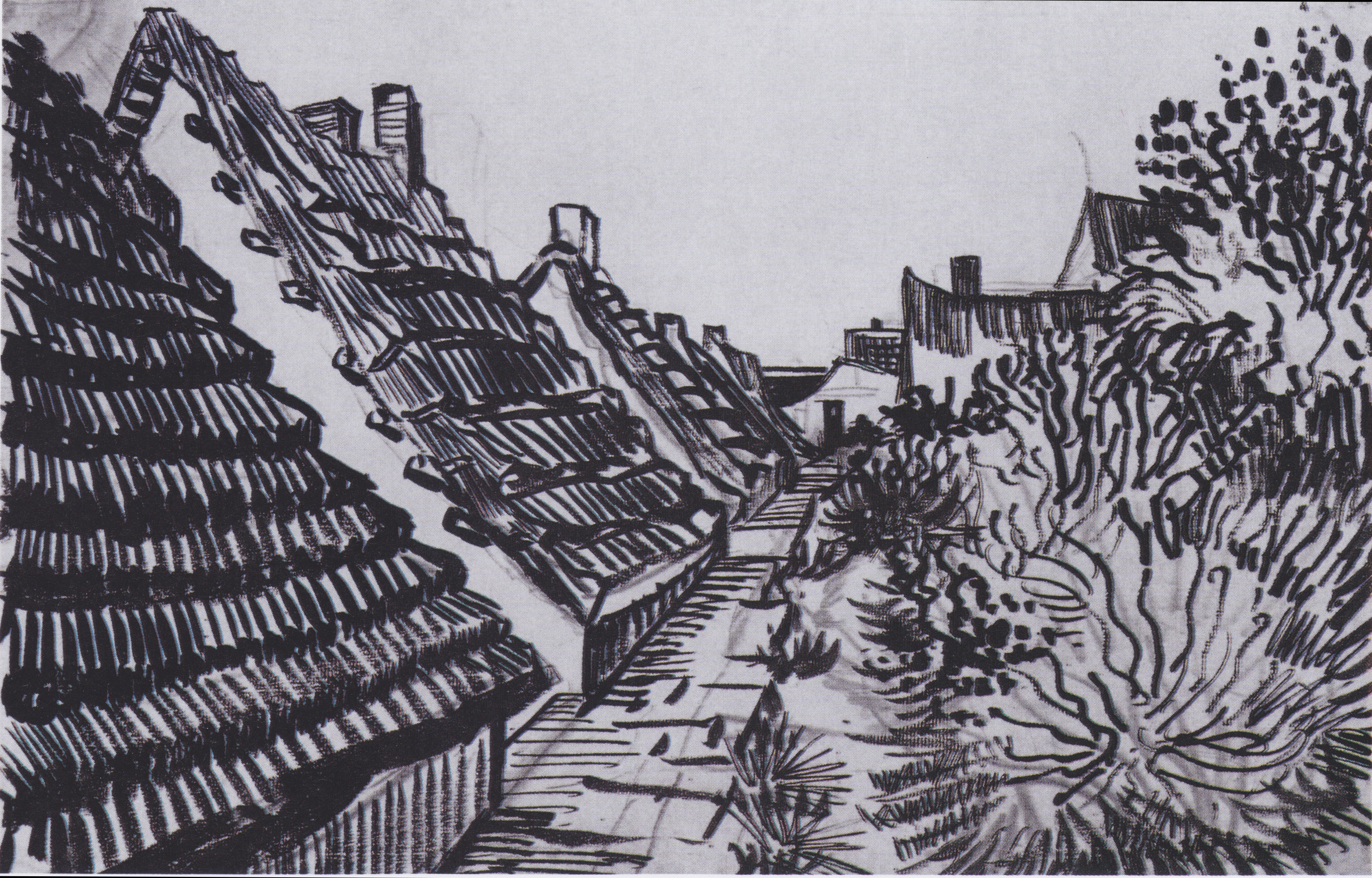
Street in Saintes-Maries, Reed pen, 1888, Private Collection (F1434)

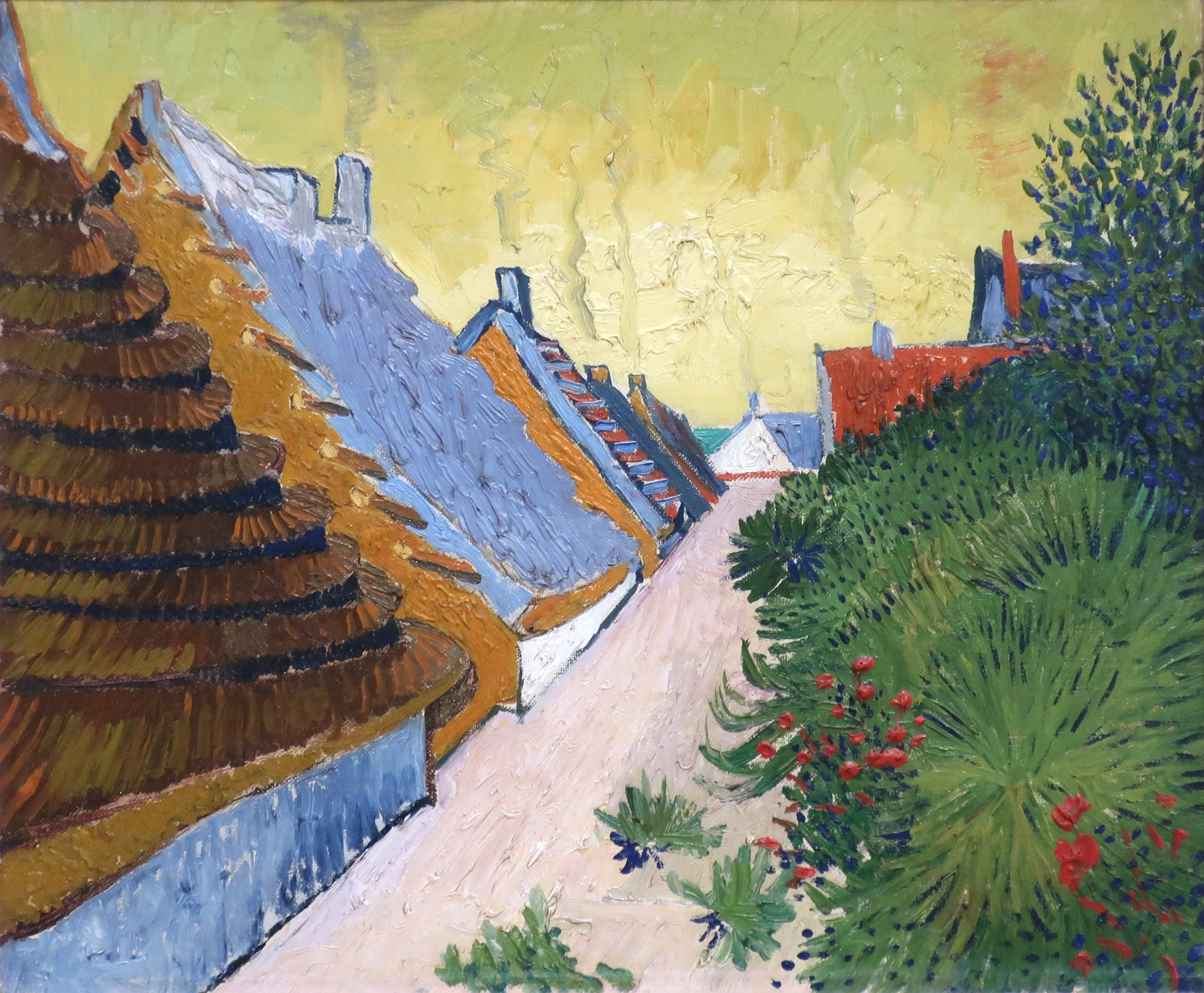
Street in Saintes-Maries, 1888, Private Collection (F420)

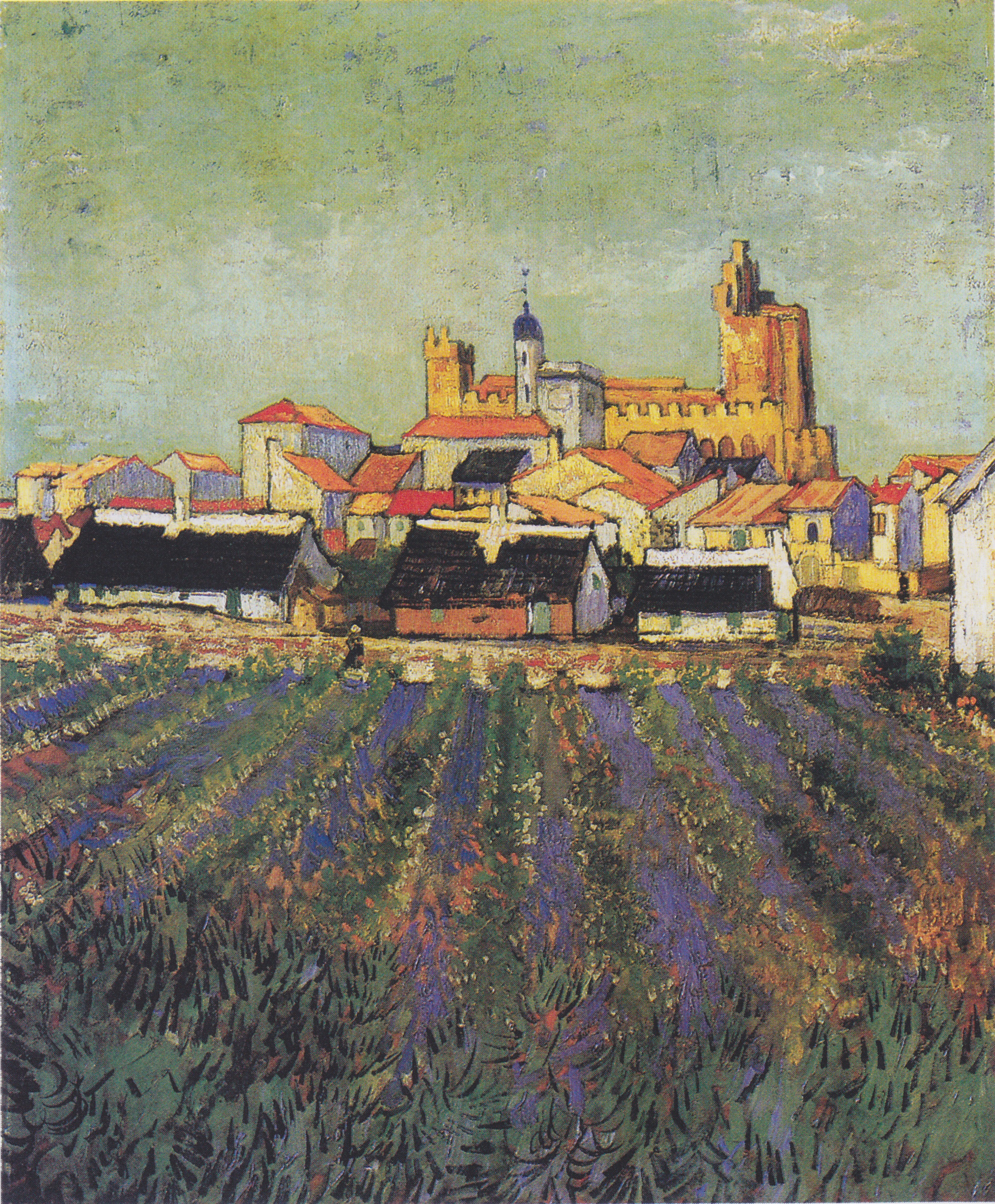
View of Saintes-Maries, 1888, Kröller-Müller Museum, Otterlo, Netherlands (F416)

The Philadelphia Museum of Art owns a drawing that Van Gogh made titled The Road at Saintes-Maries. It is also known as Cottages in Saintes-Maries (F1436).

== See also ==
- List of works by Vincent van Gogh

== Bibliography ==
- Bailey, Martin, Studio of the south : Van Gogh in Provence, 2016, p. 52, 56-57.
- Beaujean, D (2000). Van Gogh: Life and Work. Cologne: Konemann. ISBN 3-8290-2938-1.
- “Gogh, Vincent Willem Van.” Benezit Dictionary of Artists, 2011. https://doi.org/10.1093/benz/9780199773787.article.b00076203
- Gogh, Vincent van. Letter to Theo van Gogh, June 3, 1888.
- Kahng, Eik, Cronan, Todd, Misteli, David, Rainof, Rebecca, Skokowski, Rachel, Heugten, Sjraar van, Young, Marnin, Through Vincent's eyes : Van Gogh and his sources, 2021, p. 73-76
- Tilborgh, Louis van, Bakker, Nienke, Homburg, Cornelia, Kodera, Tsukasa, Uhlenbeck, Chris, Guitton, Claire, Van Gogh & Japan, 2017, p. 69, 72, 191.
- Uitert, Evert van. “Gogh, Vincent (Willem) Van.” Grove Art Online, 2003. https://doi.org/10.1093/gao/9781884446054.article.t033020
- “Vincent van Gogh - Seascape near Les Saintes-Maries-de-La-Mer.” Van Gogh Museum. Accessed October 5, 2023. https://www.vangoghmuseum.nl/en/collection/s0117v1962
- Willard, Christopher. 1997. “Manipulating Texture.” American Artist 61 (659): 10–15. https://search.ebscohost.com/login.aspx?direct=true&AuthType=ip,shib&db=asu&AN=503375823&site=ehost-live.
