= Emile Hennequin =

French writer (1859–1888)

Emile Hennequin (born Palermo, Kingdom of the Two Sicilies; 1859 – 14 July 1888) was a French author, publisher, writer, and philosopher who wrote theoretical and critical pieces. His work "exemplified the tension between the positivist drive to systematize literary criticism and the unfettered imagination inherent in literature." He was one of the few positivist thinkers who disagreed with the notion that subjectivity invalidates observation, judgment and prediction, and argued that subjectivity does play a role in science and society. His contribution to positivism pertains not to science and its objectivity, but rather to the subjectivity of art and the way artists, their work, and audiences interrelate. Hennequin tried to analyze positivism strictly on the predictions, and the mechanical processes, but was perplexed due to the contradictions of the reactions of patrons to artwork that showed no scientific inclinations.
