= Sinai (Noguchi) =

Public artwork by Isamu Noguchi

- Artist: Isamu Noguchi
- Year: 1967
- Type: Cast iron
- Dimensions: 91 cm × 53 cm × 28 cm (36 in × 21 in × 11 in)
- Location: Lynden Sculpture Garden, Milwaukee

External image
- Sinai; The Isamu Noguchi Foundation and Garden Museum

Sinai is a public artwork by the Japanese American artist Isamu Noguchi, located at the Lynden Sculpture Garden, which is near Milwaukee, Wisconsin, United States. Sinai is a cast-iron sculpture measuring 36 inches (910 mm) high, 21 inches (530 mm) wide, and 11 inches (280 mm) deep. It is part of a series of work created between the 1967 and 1969, during which time Noguchi was collaborating with the Japanese stone carver Masatoshi Izumi.

== Description ==
Sinai is a cast iron sculpture (1 of 6 casts) typical of iron modernist art sculpture of the late 1960s. The sculpture consists of a circular biomorphic ring form with square protrusions on the upper half. The sculpture is a dark iron, almost black in appearance. Noguchi was heavily influenced by Constantin Brâncuși's simplified and reduced forms that get at the essence of materials because of their minimal handling. His body of work in this time period is enigmatic; it becomes difficult to discern what the forms are or from where their inspiration was manifested. This enigma allows the viewer's mind to oscillate between potential representation to total abstraction based on elementary forms such as circles, tubes, curves, lumps, holes, etc. in conjunction with raw untouched surfaces as seen in some of his marble and granite carvings.

== Background ==
Isamu Noguchi is widely regarded as one of the most prominent and revered artists of the 20th century. His artistic practice spanned many mediums including furniture design, traditional sculpture, ceramics, theater, dance, and gardens. Noguchi studied and worked collaboratively with a diverse group of visual artists, dancers, actors, and performance artists, some of these collaborations include sculptors Onorio Ruotolo and Constantin Brâncuși, dancer Martha Graham, dancer/choreographer Merce Cunningham, composer John Cage, and stone carver Mosotoshi Izumi. Noguchi's prominence in the international art world made him a sought-after artist to collect.

The Lynden Sculpture Garden was originally the estate of Harry Lynde Bradley and Margaret (Peg) Blackney Bradley. In 1962 Peg Bradley began collecting work by some of the most renowned visual artists of the 20th century including Barbara Hepworth, Henry Moore, Alexander Archipenko, Mark Di Suvero, and Isamu Noguchi.

=== Location history ===
Sinai is located at the Lynden Sculpture Garden, 2145 West Brown Deer Road, Milwaukee, Wisconsin. The Lynden Sculpture Garden is a 40-acre estate housing an extensive art collection that is internationally renowned, the estate was a private collection until just recently. In 2009 the Bradley Family Foundation opened the estate and collection to the public, which now houses a studio space and gallery.
