= Jean-Paul Aubé =

French sculptor

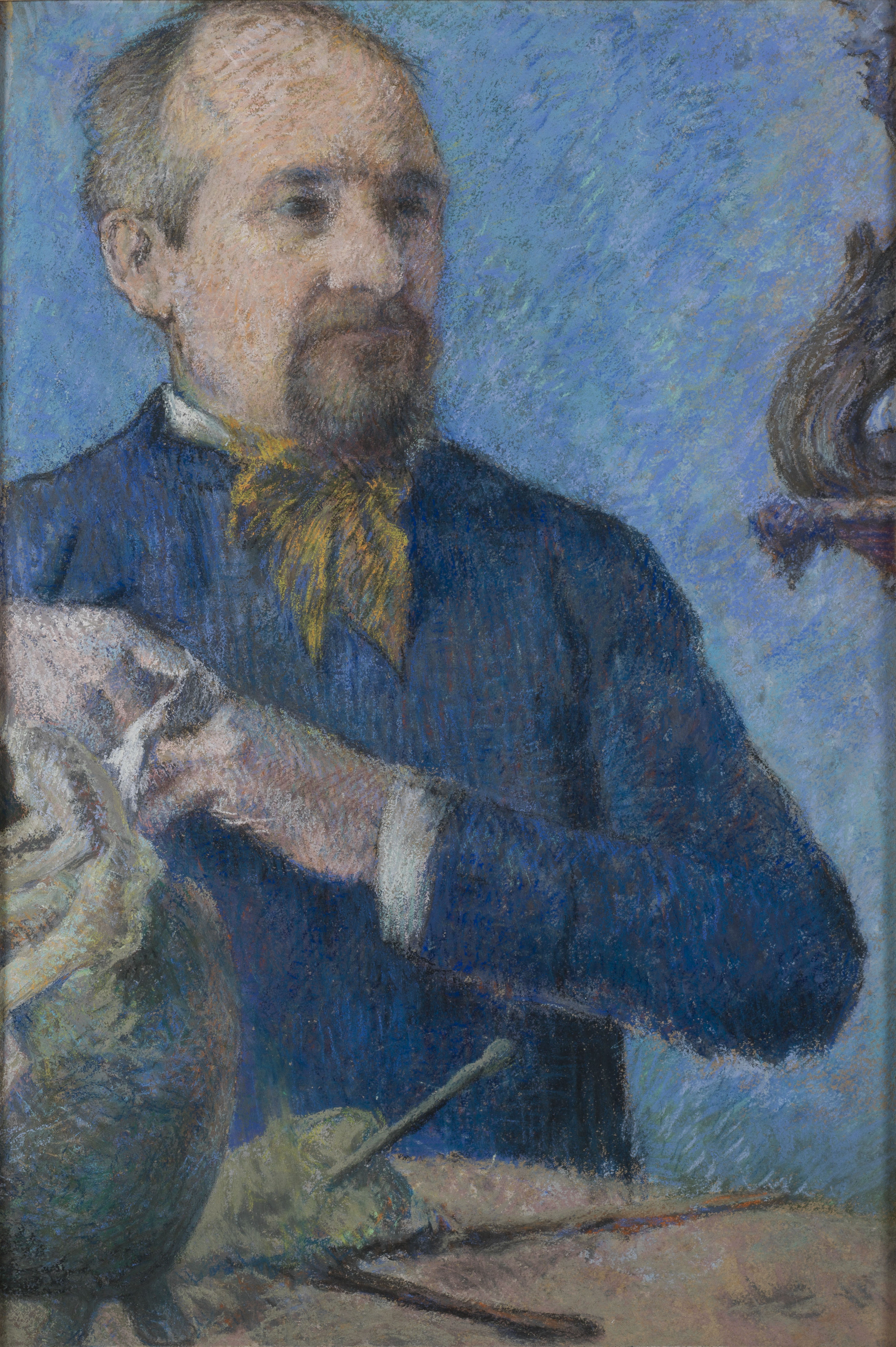
- portrait by Paul Gauguin
- Born: 3 July 1837; Longwy
- Died: 23 August 1916 (aged 79); Capbreton
- Alma mater: Beaux-Arts de Paris
- Occupation: Sculptor, painter

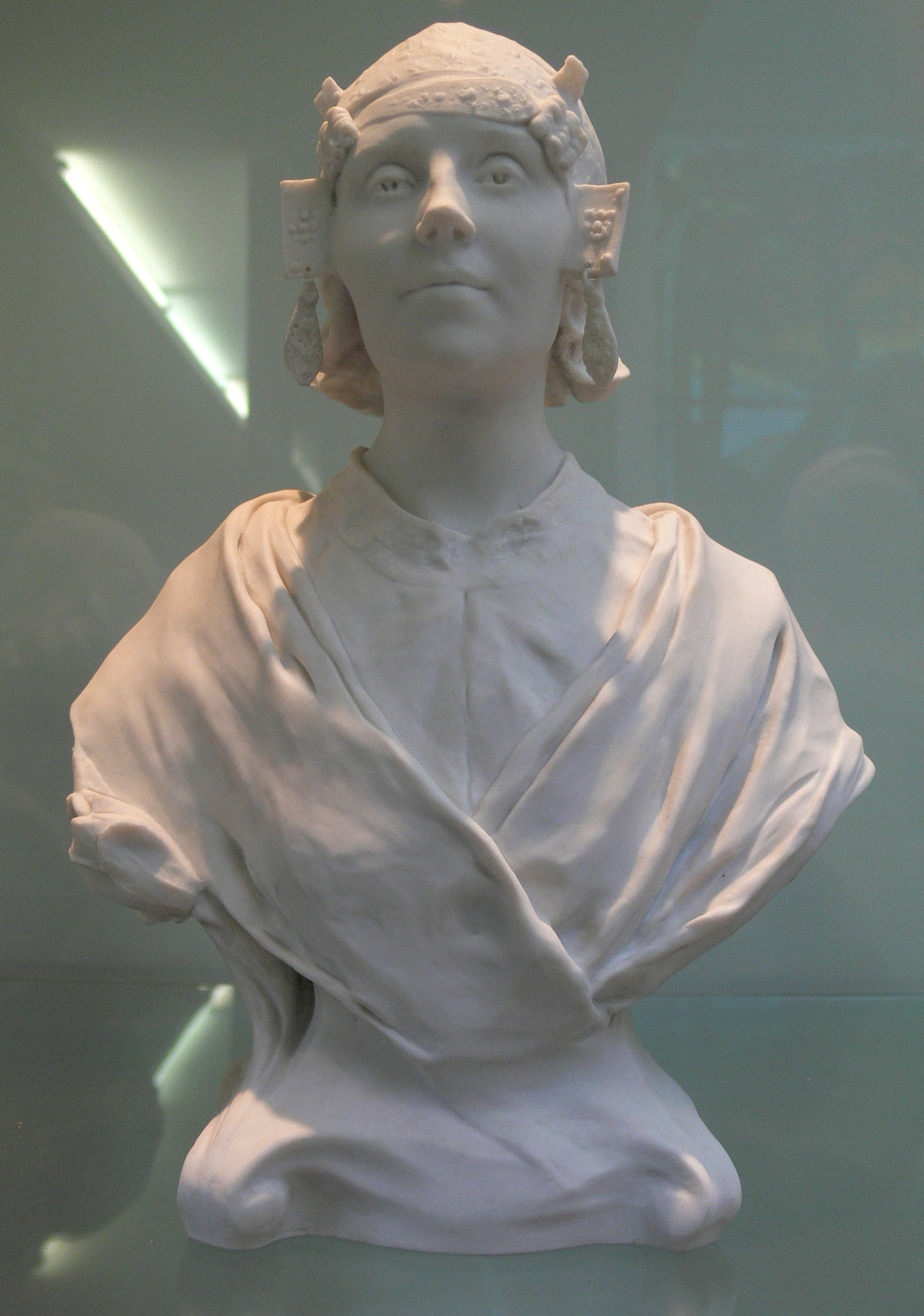
Buste de Hollandaise, by Jean-Paul Aubé, La Piscine (museum of art and industry).

Jean-Paul Aubé (3 July 1837 – 23 August 1916) was a French sculptor.

Aubé was born in Longwy, north eastern France, and educated at the Ecole des Beaux-Arts.

He died at Capbreton.

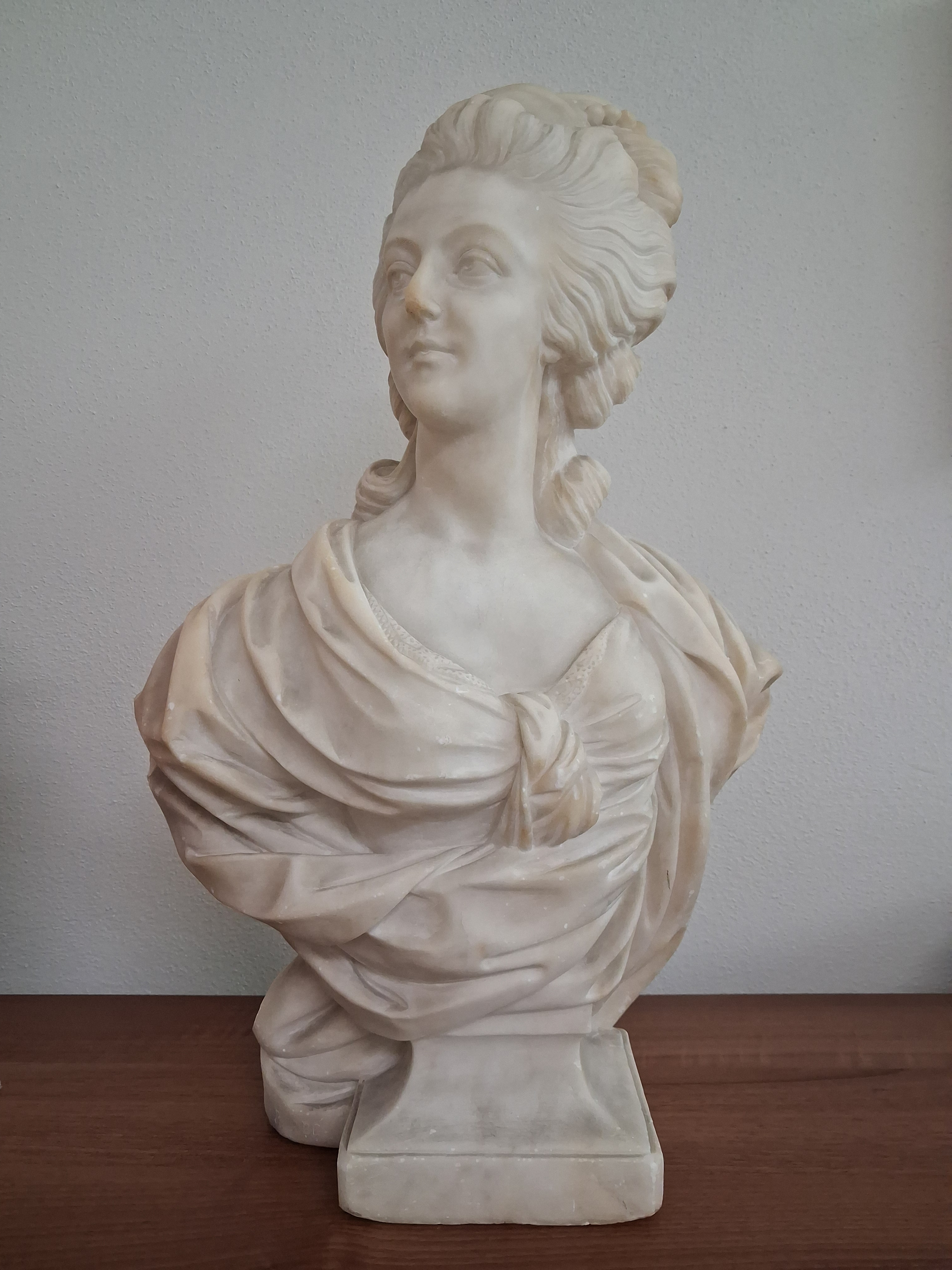
Marie-Antoinette sculpture en marbre blanc de Carrara, Jean-Paul Aubé, collection privée E. Canigiani, Quarrata (PT) Italie

== Main works ==
- Dante, 1879, plaster, model of the bronze statue of the place Marcellin Berthelot, to the Collège de France in Paris
- Buste de hollandaise, La Piscine (museum of art and industry)
- La Comtesse Hallez, Musée d'Orsay
- Monument à Léon Gambetta, erected in the Cour of Napoleon of the Louvre, a 27-meter monument inaugurated on 14 July 1888, permanently removed from the court of Napoleon in 1954.
- La statue de J.B.Colbert aux Manufactures des Gobelins.
