= Hans Siebert von Heister =

Hans Siebert von Heister (19 January 1888 – 1967) was a German Expressionist painter and a radio pioneer.

== Life ==
Hans Siebert von Heister was born in Düsseldorf. He studied painting under Lovis Corinth and Konrad von Kardorff starting in 1911. In 1919, he became a member of the artist group Young Rhineland and joined the Novembergruppe in Berlin. His painting Weib was acquired by the Düsseldorf Municipal Art Collection (Museum Kunstpalast) in 1922. Following the transfer of power to the National Socialists in 1933, the painting was confiscated and displayed in the Degenerate Art exhibition in Munich in 1937.

In 1921, von Heister began a career in journalism and became a co-founder of broadcasting in Germany. From 1924 to 1940, he was the editor-in-chief of the radio magazine Deutscher Rundfunk. During the Second World War, in 1942—at the height of German expansion—he served as editor of the programmatic text Nationale Wirtschaftsordnung und Grossraumwirtschaft (National Economic Order and Greater-Area Economy) for the Society for European Economic Planning and Greater-Area Economy.

After the war, von Heister worked as a freelance painter and writer. He died in 1967 in Berlin

== Selected publications ==
- H. S. v. Heister, Raoul Hausmann (editors): Führer durch die Abteilung der Novembergruppe. Kunstausstellung Berlin. Hanover: Steegemann, 1921
- (editor): Das Buch der Ansager: Die ständigen Rundfunkansager der europäischen Sender und der grossen amerikanischen Rundfunkgesellschaften in Wort und Bild. Mit Unterstützung der Rundfunk-Gesellschaften. Berlin: Rothgiesser & Diesing, 1932
- Hans Siebert v. Heister, Felix Kühl: Nationale Wirtschaftsordnung und Grossraumwirtschaft. Dresden: Meinhold, 1942
