= Mariano Andreu =

Spanish painter

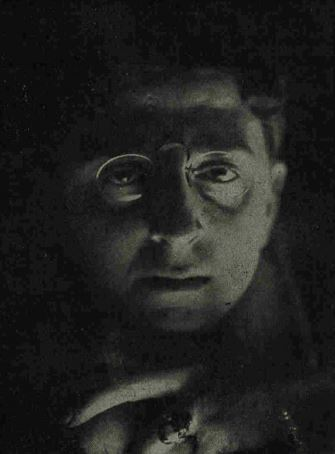
Mariano Andreu

Mariano Andreu (1888–1976) was a Spanish painter, drawer, enamelling master, sculptor, and stage designer.

He was born in Mataró in 1888 and lived his early childhood above the Teatro Circo Barcelonés in the Calle Montserrat. Early on he was affiliated to the "Noucentistes" movement, named by his friend Eugenio d'Ors. He studied in London under Alexander Fisher an enamaller of the Central Arts & Crafts School in London. Returning to Barcelona Andreu made one of the world's largest enamels, the triptych "L'Orb" using contemporary enamelling techniques of the day.

He left Spain for Paris, with his wife Philomene ("Filo") Stes, he became involved in stage design; he carried out works such as Voleur d'Images, Sonatina for the Opéra-Comique in 1929, La guerre de Troie n'aura pas lieu for Louis Jouvet's Théâtre de l'Athénée (1935). For the Ballet Russe de Monte Carlo he designed costumes and sets for Capriccio Espagnol, which premiered in Monte Carlo in 1939. He designed costumes for the 20th Century Fox film That Lady (1955, starring Olivia de Havilland and Paul Scofield) and the short ballet film Spanish Fiesta (1942).

He was invited to London by John Gielgud to design the sets and costumes for Shakespeare's Much Ado about Nothing, in 1949. He also designed the sets and costumes for Hector Berlioz's Les Troyens, directed by Gielgud at Covent Garden in 1957. In 1951 he designed Sir Alec Guinness's Hamlet and in 1955 All's Well That Ends Well, for Noel Willman.

Early exhibitions in London were seen at the Claridge Gallery and the Leicester Galleries.

Throughout his life Andreu produced some 30 Livres de Luxe, for which he early on gained an enviable reputation as one of the finest lithographers and illustrators of his day.

His work is held in many public and private collections in France, the United States, Great Britain and Spain.
