= Arch (sculpture) =

Sculpture by Ernest Carl Shaw

Coordinates: 43°10′32.9″N 87°56′8.8″W

- Artist: Ernest Carl Shaw
- Year: 1976
- Type: steel
- Dimensions: 330 cm × 140 cm × 76 cm (128 in × 57 in × 30 in)
- Location: Lynden Sculpture Garden; Milwaukee, Wisconsin
- Owner: Bradley Family Foundation

Arch is a public art work by artist Ernest Carl Shaw located at the Lynden Sculpture Garden near Milwaukee, Wisconsin. The sculpture is an abstract form made of four steel bars arranged in a trapezoid; it is rust-colored and installed on the lawn.

== See also ==
- Epicenter
- Epicenter II
- III Columns
