= Epicenter (disambiguation) =

The epicenter, or epicentre, is the point on the Earth's surface that is directly above the point where an earthquake or underground explosion originates.

Epicenter or epicentre may also refer to:

- Blast seat, the point of detonation of an explosive device
- Epicenter (book), a 2006 book by Joel C. Rosenberg
- Epicenter (music festival), an annual rock festival in North Carolina, USA
- Epicenter (sculpture), a work by Ernest Carl Shaw in Milwaukee, Wisconsin, US
- Epicentr K, a network of home improvement retail stores in Ukraine
- LoanMart Field, previously the Rancho Cucamonga Epicenter, a baseball stadium in California
- Epicentre, a research component of Doctors Without Borders - see Médecins Sans Frontières § Epicentre
- Epicenter (horse), an American thoroughbred race horse
