= Orbits (sculpture) =

Sculpture by Alexander Liberman

Coordinates: 43°10′36.6″N 87°56′11.8″W

- Artist: Alexander Liberman
- Year: 1967
- Type: steel
- Dimensions: 160 cm × 190 cm × 64 cm (64 in × 73 in × 25 in)
- Location: Lynden Sculpture Garden, Milwaukee, Wisconsin
- Owner: Bradley Family Foundation

Orbits is a public art work by Russian-American artist Alexander Liberman located at the Lynden Sculpture Garden near Milwaukee, Wisconsin. The sculpture is an abstract form; it is installed on the patio.

== Description ==
The sculpture consists of four narrow tubes painted red-orange. Two tubes form ellipses; two thrust toward the ground and out into space.

== See also ==
- Argo
- Axeltree
- Ritual II
