= Ritual II =

Public art work by Alexander Liberman

Coordinates: 43°10′33.1″N 87°56′08.1″W

- Artist: Alexander Liberman
- Year: 1966
- Type: steel
- Dimensions: 1,040 cm × 150 cm × 150 cm (408 in × 60 in × 60 in)
- Location: Lynden Sculpture Garden, Milwaukee, Wisconsin
- Owner: Bradley Family Foundation

Ritual II is a public art work by Russian-American artist Alexander Liberman located at the Lynden Sculpture Garden near Milwaukee, Wisconsin. The sculpture is an abstract form; it is installed on the lawn.

== Description ==
The sculpture consists of a black monolith set on a circular base. Near the shaft's base is a circular form.

== See also ==
- Argo
- Axeltree
- Orbits
