= Axeltree =

Public art work by Alexander Liberman

Coordinates: 43°10′33.4″N 87°56′16.4″W

- Artist: Alexander Liberman
- Year: 1967
- Medium: Steel
- Movement: Abstract
- Dimensions: 190 cm × 370 cm × 280 cm (74 in × 144 in × 110 in)
- Location: Lynden Sculpture Garden; Milwaukee, Wisconsin
- Owner: Bradley Family Foundation
- Website: https://www.lyndensculpturegarden.org/collection/axeltree

Axeltree is a public art work by Russian-American artist Alexander Liberman located at the Lynden Sculpture Garden near Milwaukee, Wisconsin. The sculpture is an abstract form; it is installed on the lawn.

== Description ==
Axeltree is a steel sculpture painted red-orange. The statue is 84 in x 144 in x 110 in.

The sculpture is made up of a large flat disk on its side connected to a wide tube base. A smaller concave disk is set perpendicular to the larger disk and is connected to the base by a narrow, curved tube. A jagged tube protrudes from the tube that connects the smaller disk and extends to the other side of the base.

== See also ==
- Argo
- Orbits
- Ritual II
