= Floating Sculpture No. 3 =

Sculpture by Marta Pan in Milwaukee, US

Coordinates: 43°10′32.3″N 87°56′13.0″W

- Artist: Marta Pan
- Year: 1972
- Type: red fiberglass
- Dimensions: 230 cm × 180 cm × 230 cm (89 in × 71 in × 89 in)
- Location: Lynden Sculpture Garden; Milwaukee, Wisconsin

Floating Sculpture No. 3 is a public art work by artist Marta Pan located at the Lynden Sculpture Garden near Milwaukee, Wisconsin. The red fiberglass sculpture is kinetic; it is installed in the pond.
