= Twist for Max =

Public art work by Bernard Kirschenbaum

Coordinates: 43°10′33.9″N 87°56′11.3″W

- Artist: Bernard Kirschenbaum
- Year: 1974
- Type: aluminum
- Location: Lynden Sculpture Garden; Milwaukee, Wisconsin
- Owner: Bradley Family Foundation

Twist for Max is a public art work by artist Bernard Kirschenbaum located at the Lynden Sculpture Garden near Milwaukee, Wisconsin. The abstract sculpture is a column of twisting aluminum; it is installed on the lawn.

== See also ==
- Way Four
