= List of public art in Norfolk =

This is a list of public art in the Norfolk county of England. This list applies only to works of public art on permanent display in an outdoor public space. For example, this does not include artworks in museums.

The list can be sorted by clicking on the corresponding arrows in the column titles.

Image	Title / subject	Location and coordinates	Date	Artist / designer	Type	Material	Dimensions	Designation	Notes
	Charity	Fishermen's Hospital, Church Plain, Great Yarmouth 52.61007°N 1.72723°E	1702		Statue	Painted cast lead		Grade II	Restored by English Heritage in 1987.
More images	Lord Nelson	The Close, Norwich 52°37′53.2″N 1°17′58.8″E	1847	Thomas Milnes	Statue	Stone		Grade II	A life-size statue in Admiral's uniform, with a cannon at his feet.
More images	Duke of Wellington	The Close, Norwich 52°37′50.7″N 1°18′0.3″E	1854	George Gammon Adams	Statue	Bronze		Grade II	A life-size statue in civilian dress, with a cannon at his feet.
	Frederick Savage	London Road, King's Lynn 52°44′47.5″N 0°24′07.6″E	1892		Statue	Limestone			Unveiled on 27 May 1892.
	Doulton ceramic	Royal Arcade, Norwich 52°37′41.5″N 1°17′38.4″E	1899	William James Neatby		Ceramic			Tiles by Neatby decorate George Skipper's architecture.
More images	Boer War Memorial	Agricultural Hall Plain, Norwich 52°37′44.7″N 1°17′51.3″E	1904	George Edward Wade	Statue	Bronze statue on stone plinth		Grade II	
More images	Thomas Browne	Hay Hill, Norwich 52°37′38.7″N 1°17′33.9″E	1905	Henry Pegram	Statue	Bronze on granite plinth		Grade II	He is shown seated, in contemplation.
	Edward VII	King Edward VII High School, King's Lynn 52°45′24.7″N 0°24′50.3″E	1906	William Robert Colton	Statue	Bronze, on stone pedestal		Grade II	He is seated, in regal dress, with two cherubs behind him.
More images	Edith Cavell Memorial	Tombland, Norwich 52°37′53.3″N 1°17′56.8″E	1918	Henry Pegram	Statue	Bronze bust on stone plinth		Grade II*	Sited at this location since 1993. The plinth bears a life-size carving in high relief of a soldier.
	World War I Memorial	St George's Park, Great Yarmouth 52°36′21.3″N 1°43′49.4″E	1922	F. R. B. Haward	Memorial	Granite		Grade II	Unveiled by Prince Henry, Duke of Gloucester.
More images	Norwich War Memorial	Garden Terrace, Norwich 52°37′42.8″N 1°17′32.4″E	1927	Edwin Lutyens		Portland stone, bronze flambeaux		Grade II*	Moved to the memorial gardens in 1938.
More images	Lion statues	City Hall, Norwich 52.62863°N 1.29186°E	1938	Alfred Hardman	Statue	Bronze			Two lions face each other at the entrance of Norwich City Hall, opened in 1938 by George VI and Queen Elizabeth.
	Amelia Opie	Opie Street, Norwich 52.62964°N 1.29617°E	1956	Z. Leon and J. P. Chaplin	Statue	Artificial stone			She is shown in Quaker dress. The statue was carved in wood and cast in artificial stone.
	Sea Form (Atlantic)	Norwich Castle Museum and Art Gallery 52.63219°N 1.29482°E	1964	Barbara Hepworth	Sculpture	Bronze	1.98 metres (6 ft 6 in) high		Inspired by the coastline at Porthcurno. The third of six casts of the sculpture.
More images	Public Sculpture	Prospect House, Rouen Road, Norwich 52°37′34.9″N 1°17′50.9″E	1970	Bernard Meadows	Sculpture	Bronze and concrete		Grade II	Unveiled by Princess Alexandra when the Eastern Counties Newspapers offices opened in 1970.
	Mother and Child	Norwich Cathedral 52.63228°N 1.30192°E	1984	Naomi Blake	Sculpture	Fibreglass	2.00 metres (6 ft 7 in) high, plinth 0.42 metres (1 ft 5 in) high		Presented to Norwich Cathedral by the sculptor.
	Respect and Tolerance	War Memorial Park, Yarmouth Road, North Walsham 52°49′08.5″N 1°23′21.7″E	1999	Mark Goldsworthy	Sculpture	Wood	3.00 metres (9.84 ft) high, plinth 0.80 metres (2 ft 7 in) high		
More images	George Vancouver	Purfleet Quay, King's Lynn 52.75381°N 0.39281°E	2000	Penelope Reeve	Statue	Bronze and granite	1.80 metres (5 ft 11 in) high, plinth 0.94 metres (3 ft 1 in) high		The granite block on which the statue is mounted is from Squamish, British Columbia.
	Mum Bags Brook Where the Shoppin' Go	Pye's Mill, Loddon 52.53831°N 1.48766°E	2001	Mark Goldsworthy	Sculpture	Wood	3.00 metres (9.84 ft) high		A family group.
	Saint George Silencing the Dragon	Nelson Road, Great Yarmouth 52.60575°N 1.73254°E	2008	Mark Goldsworthy	Sculpture	Wood			
	Breath	Garden Terrace, Norwich 52.62858°N 1.29231°E	2011	Paul de Monchaux	Sculpture				Commissioned as a companion piece to the Norwich War Memorial.
	Watton Sculpture	George Trollope Road, Watton 52.57122°N 0.82122°E		Charlotte Howarth	Sculpture	Steel	1.54 metres (5 ft 1 in) high		Three sculptures within a paved ring; the brushed steel has lettering and pictorial motifs.
	Tom Running	City of Norwich School, Norwich 52.61259°N 1.27516°E		Brian Alabaster	Sculpture				
	Art Deco figures	City Hall, Norwich 52.62850°N 1.29066°E							
