= Tensione No. 2 =

Public art work by Aldo Calo

Coordinates: 43°10′36.0″N 87°56′13.8″W

- Artist: Aldo Calo
- Year: 1962
- Type: fiberglass
- Location: Lynden Sculpture Garden; Milwaukee, Wisconsin
- Owner: Bradley Family Foundation

Tensione No. 2 is a public art work by artist Aldo Calo located at the Lynden Sculpture Garden near Milwaukee, Wisconsin. The sculpture is an abstract made of fiberglass arranged in crescent-shaped forms stacked on each other; it is installed on a concrete pedestal on the lawn.
