= Vincent FitzGerald & Company =

Publisher of handmade, limited edition artist books

Vincent FitzGerald & Company is a New York-based publisher of handmade, limited edition artist books, individual prints, and portfolios. The firm was founded in 1980 by Vincent FitzGerald and has collaborated with over 150 artists, artisans, poets, and playwrights.

Vincent FitzGerald & Company has produced a large collection of books represented in many collections throughout the United States and Europe. The bulk of the collection is represented at Columbia University, Iowa University, The Library of Congress, Lyrik-Kabinett in Munich, Montana Museum of Arts and Culture at the University of Montana and the Cary Collection at Rochester Institute of Technology.

== Exhibitions ==
Vincent FitzGerald & Company has fostered a long relationship with Dieu Donné, a major papermaking mill in Brooklyn, NY. There have been several exhibitions organized by Dieu Donné of the collection of the firm's output, as well as panels on the art of bookmaking.

In 1985, a major exhibition and panel was held around The Côte d'Azur Triangle at the Harcus Gallery in Boston. The book featured lithographs and etchings by Mark Beard, depicting the play The Côte d'Azur Triangle by Henry Kondoleon. Robert Blackburn's Printmaking Workshop produced the prints, fostering many artistic connections for Vincent FitzGerald & Company. The Harcus Gallery exhibited the book, along with the binding and printing tools used to produce it. David Becker from the Museum of Fine Arts, Boston, moderated a panel to open the exhibition.

In 2000, an exhibition of Vincent FitzGerald & Co.'s collection was held at Columbia University, titled Themes and Variations: The Publications of Vincent FitzGerald & Company. The firm had produced 38 books at the time of the exhibition.

In 2021 a selection of books and prints published by Vincent FitzGerald & Company were on display at JDJ The Ice House in Garrison, NY, included in an exhibition of the work of Susan Weil, a longtime collaborator of FitzGerald's.

== Collaborators ==
Vincent FitzGerald's practice relates to the French tradition of livres d'artistes, and the collaborative working environment of bringing together multiple people of specific talents to work on a single project. Works by writers such as Henrik Ibsen, James Joyce, Franz Kafka, and Gertrude Stein have been interpreted by artists, printmakers, and other craftsmen to create books and portfolios. FitzGerald has worked closely with translator and bookbinder Zahra Partovi on the selection and translation of texts by 13th century Persian poet Jalāl ad-Dīn Mohammad Rūmī. In 1996, the company published Divan-e shams, which has been described as the firm's masterpiece. Translated for the first time in English by Partovi, the book presents the work of fifteen visual artists in response to a selection of poems from Rumi's Divan-e shams.

== Participants ==
The visual artists that have interpreted text through various media include:

- Mark Beard
- Joan Busing
- Lena Cronqvist
- Sandy Gellis
- Elizabeth Harrington
- Bernard Kirschenbaum
- Ted Kurahara
- Agnes Murray
- James Narres
- Dorothea Rockburne
- Betye Saar
- Annette Senneby
- Michelle Stuart
- Peter Thompson
- Judith Turner
- Susan Weil
- Neil Welliver
- Marjorie Van Dyke
- Joan Vennum

The craftsmen include:

- Kelly Driscoll
- Aleksander Duravcevic
- Jerry Kelly, calligrapher
- Priscilla Spitler, from Hands On Bookbinding
- Paul Wong, paper artist from Dieu Donné

The authors, translators, and playwrights include:

- Lee Breuer
- Michael Feingold
- David Mamet
- David Rattray
- Zahra Partovi, translator (also bookbinder)
