= Mo, Ni, Que =

Public art work by Samuel Buri

Coordinates: 43°10′31.3″N 87°56′13.3″W

- Artist: Samuel Buri
- Year: 1975
- Type: fiberglass
- Dimensions: 140 cm × 220 cm × 91 cm (54 in × 86 in × 36 in)
- Location: Lynden Sculpture Garden; Milwaukee, Wisconsin

Mo, Ni, Que is a public art work by Swiss artist Samuel Buri located at the Lynden Sculpture Garden near Milwaukee, Wisconsin. The fiberglass sculpture consists of three colorful cows that appear to graze; it is installed on the lawn. The title of the sculpture is derived from the name of its original owner, Monique Barbier. Mo, Ni, Que was exhibited at the Kunsthalle, Basel, Switzerland from January 22 to February 20, 1977, as part of a three-man show featuring Samuel Buri, William Phillips and Hans Remond.
