= Conversations with Magic Stones, Figure Three =

Sculpture by Barbara Hepworth

Coordinates: 43°10′35.0″N 87°56′15.5″W

Conversations with Magic Stones, Figure 3
- Artist: Barbara Hepworth
- Year: 1973
- Type: bronze
- Dimensions: 280 cm × 48 cm × 53 cm (111 in × 19 in × 21 in)
- Location: Lynden Sculpture Garden; Milwaukee, Wisconsin
- Owner: Bradley Family Foundation

Conversations with Magic Stones, Figure Three is a public art work by English artist Barbara Hepworth located at the Lynden Sculpture Garden near Milwaukee, Wisconsin. The sculpture is an abstract, totemic form made of bronze; it is installed on the lawn. Originally, this work was created as part of a multi-part sculpture with two other "figures" (vertical abstract bronze sculptures) and three "magic stones" (bronze eight-sided polyhedrons). One of these other works, Conversations with Magic Stones (Magic Stone Three), is also installed at the Lynden Sculpture Garden.
