= Peristyle, Three Lines =

Sculpture by George Rickey

Coordinates: 43°10′37.1″N 87°56′13.5″W

- Artist: George Rickey
- Year: 1963
- Type: stainless steel
- Dimensions: 250 cm × 210 cm × 340 cm (98 in × 84 in × 132 in)
- Location: Lynden Sculpture Garden; Milwaukee, Wisconsin

Peristyle, Three Lines is a public art work by artist George Rickey located at the Lynden Sculpture Garden near Milwaukee, Wisconsin. The kinetic sculpture consists of three tapering spear-like forms thrusting vertically; it is installed on the lawn.
