= Epicenter II =

American public artwork by Ernest Carl Shaw

Coordinates: 43°10′32.5″N 87°56′08.8″W

- Artist: Ernest Carl Shaw
- Year: 1976
- Type: steel
- Dimensions: 300 cm × 500 cm × 370 cm (120 in × 196 in × 144 in)
- Location: Lynden Sculpture Garden; Milwaukee, Wisconsin
- Owner: Bradley Family Foundation

Epicenter II is a monumental public art work by artist Ernest Carl Shaw located at the Lynden Sculpture Garden near Milwaukee, Wisconsin. The sculpture is an abstract form made of several steel bars oriented diagonally to the ground; it is rust-colored and installed on the lawn.

== See also ==
- Epicenter
- III Columns
