= Conversations with Magic Stones (Magic Stone Three) =

Sculpture by Barbara Hepworth

Conversations with Magic Stones (Magic Stone 3)
- Artist: Barbara Hepworth
- Year: 1973
- Type: bronze
- Dimensions: 91 cm × 120 cm × 61 cm (36 in × 48 in × 24 in)
- Location: Lynden Sculpture Garden; Milwaukee, Wisconsin; 43.1742226°N 87.9356347°W
- Owner: Bradley Family Foundation

Conversations with Magic Stones (Magic Stone Three) is a public art work by English artist Barbara Hepworth located at the Lynden Sculpture Garden near Milwaukee, Wisconsin. The sculpture is an abstract, modified cube form made of bronze; it is installed on the lawn. Originally, this work was created as part of a multi-part sculpture with two other bronze "magic stones" (eight-sided polyhedrons) and three "figures" (vertical abstract sculptures). One of these other works, Conversations with Magic Stones (Figure Three), is also installed at the Lynden Sculpture Garden.
