= III Columns =

Sculpture by Ernest Carl Shaw

Coordinates: 43°10′30.9″N 87°56′06.8″W

- Artist: Ernest Carl Shaw
- Year: 1976
- Type: steel
- Dimensions: 240 cm × 120 cm × 76 cm (93 in × 46 in × 30 in)
- Location: Lynden Sculpture Garden; Milwaukee, Wisconsin
- Owner: Bradley Family Foundation

III Columns is a public art work by artist Ernest Carl Shaw located at the Lynden Sculpture Garden near Milwaukee, Wisconsin. The sculpture is an abstract form made of several steel bars set at angles; it is rust-colored and installed on the lawn.

== See also ==
- Epicenter (sculpture)
- Epicenter II
- Arch
