= Way Four =

Public art work

Coordinates: 43°10′34.6″N 87°56′10.4″W

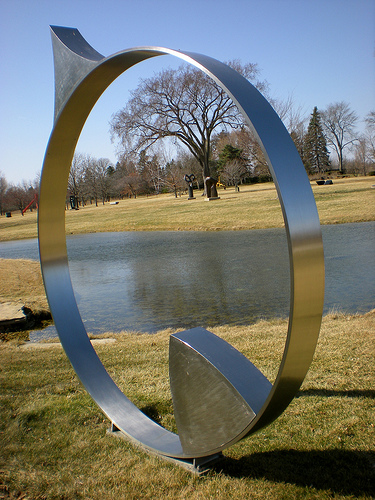
- Artist: Bernard Kirschenbaum
- Year: 1976
- Type: stainless steel
- Dimensions: 250 cm × 220 cm × 240 cm (100 in × 86 in × 96 in)
- Location: Lynden Sculpture Garden; Milwaukee, Wisconsin

Way Four is a public art work by artist Bernard Kirschenbaum at the Lynden Sculpture Garden near Milwaukee, Wisconsin. The stainless steel sculpture is an open circle that creates an orbit for two triangles; it is installed on the lawn.

== See also ==
- Twist for Max
