= Joel C. Rosenberg =

American writer (born 1967)

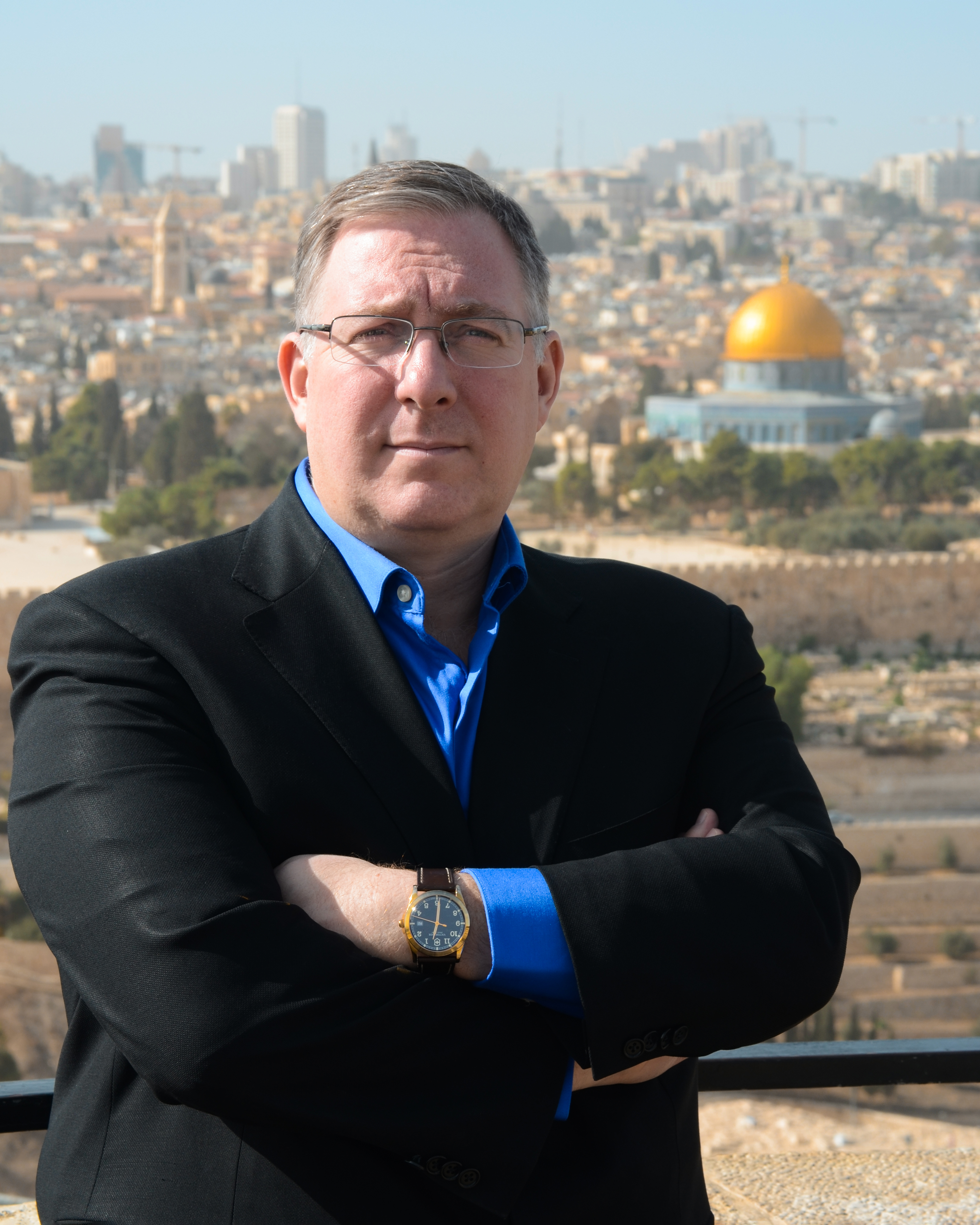
- Rosenberg in 2016
- Born: April 1967 (age 59); Rochester, New York, US
- Citizenship: American, Israeli
- Education: Syracuse University
- Occupations: Novelist, political strategist, philanthropist
- Writing career
- Period: 2001–present
- Genres: Bible prophecy, political thrillers, Middle East politics
- Website: joelrosenberg.com

Joel C. Rosenberg (born April 1967) is an American-Israeli evangelical Christian, communications strategist, author, and non-profit executive. He has written sixteen novels about terrorism and Bible prophecy, including the Gold Medallion Book Award-winner The Ezekiel Option. He also has written three nonfiction books, Epicenter, Inside the Revolution and Enemies and Allies.

== Early life, family and education ==
Rosenberg was born in April 1967 near Rochester, New York. He has stated that his father is of Jewish descent and his mother was born into a Methodist family of English descent. His parents were agnostic and became Born-again Christians when he was a child in 1973. At age 17, he became a born-again Christian and identifies as a Messianic Jew.

Rosenberg graduated in 1988 from Syracuse University, after which he worked for Rush Limbaugh as a research assistant. Later, he worked for US presidential candidate Steve Forbes as a campaign advisor. Rosenberg opened a political consultancy business which he ran until 2000, and claims to have consulted for former Israeli Deputy Prime Minister Natan Sharansky and Prime Minister Benjamin Netanyahu, where he says that he garnered much of his information on the Middle East that he uses in his books.

== Career ==
Following Netanyahu's loss in 1999, Rosenberg decided to retire from politics and begin a new career in writing. The Last Jihad was both his first book and the first of a five-part fictional series involving terrorism and how it may relate to Bible prophecy. The book was written nine months before the September 11 attacks (a revised edition takes the event into account) and was published in 2002. When published, The Last Jihad spent 11 weeks on the New York Times Best Seller list, reaching as high as number seven. It also appeared on the USA Today and Publishers Weekly best-seller lists, and hit number four on The Wall Street Journal list. The book was followed by The Last Days, which spent four weeks on the New York Times Best Seller list, hit number five on the Denver Post list, and hit number eight on the Dallas Morning News list. Following the successes of his first two novels, The Ezekiel Option was published in 2005, The Copper Scroll in 2006, and the final book Dead Heat in 2008.

Rosenberg also wrote a non-fictional account of current events and Bible prophecy in the book Epicenter. It was published in September 2006, and an accompanying DVD was produced in the summer of 2007. His second non-fiction book Inside the Revolution addresses the different sects of Islam in the Middle East and asserts that a significant number of moderate Muslims are converting to Christianity in the region. It was released in 2009 and also made it onto The New York Times Best Seller list, reaching as high as #7 as of 27 March 2009. His 2011 book The Twelfth Imam also deals with terrorism and Iran gaining nuclear power, topics also discussed in his book The Tehran Initiative.

In 2020, Rosenberg established the news websites All Israel News and All Arab News.

=== The Joshua Fund ===
Rosenberg is the founder and president of The Joshua Fund, a Christian Zionist organisation launched in 2006, a 501(c)(3) not-for-profit charity that seeks to "Bless Israel and her neighbors in the name of Jesus, according to Genesis 12:1-3." The Joshua Fund invested more than $50 million in Christian ministries and humanitarian relief projects in various countries, including Israel, Palestinian territories, Lebanon, Syria, Jordan, Iraq and Egypt.

== Criticism ==
Media Matters for America, a progressive media watchdog group, criticized Rosenberg's July 31, 2006, Paula Zahn Now CNN appearance that "featured a segment on 'whether the crisis in the Middle East is actually a prelude to the end of the world,' marking the third time in eight days that CNN has devoted airtime to those claiming that the ongoing Mideast violence signals the coming of the Apocalypse." It featured Rosenberg comparing apocalyptic Scripture in the Bible to modern events, which he views, in addition to the lenses of politics and economics, through what he calls "a third lens as well: the lens of Scripture."

Rosenberg's views on the War of Ezekiel 38–39 involving Gog and Magog are in line with dispensationalism, one of several Christian theological systems involving eschatology. Partial preterist Gary DeMar has debated Rosenberg on this subject.

== Personal life ==
Rosenberg and his wife Lynn have four sons: Caleb, Jacob, Jonah and Noah, and reside in Israel.

== Bibliography ==
Fiction

Last Jihad series

- The Last Jihad (2002) ISBN 978-1-4143-1272-9
- The Last Days (2003) ISBN 978-1-4143-1273-6
- The Ezekiel Option (2005) ISBN 978-1-4143-0344-4
- The Copper Scroll (2006) ISBN 978-1-4143-0346-8
- Dead Heat (2008) ISBN 978-1-4143-1162-3

David Shirazi series

- The Twelfth Imam (2010) ISBN 978-1-4143-1163-0
- The Tehran Initiative (2011) ISBN 978-1-4143-1935-3
- Damascus Countdown (2013) ISBN 978-1-4143-1970-4

J.B. Collins series

- The Third Target (2015) ISBN 978-1-4143-3627-5
- The First Hostage (2016) ISBN 978-1-4964-0615-6
- Without Warning (2017) ISBN 978-1-4964-0616-3

Marcus Ryker series

- The Kremlin Conspiracy (2018) ISBN 978-1-4964-0621-7
- The Persian Gamble (2019) ISBN 978-1-4964-0618-7
- The Jerusalem Assassin (2020) ISBN 978-1-4964-3784-6
- The Beirut Protocol (2021) ISBN 978-1496437891
- The Libyan Diversion (2023) ISBN 978-1-4964-3794-5
- The Beijing Betrayal (2025) ISBN 978-1496437990

Standalone novels

- The Auschwitz Escape (2014) ISBN 978-1-4143-3624-4

Non-fiction

- Epicenter (2006) ISBN 978-1-4143-1135-7
- Epicenter 2.0 (2008) ISBN 978-1-4143-1136-4
- Inside the Revolution (2009) ISBN 978-1-4143-2626-9
- Inside the Revival (2010) ISBN 978-1-4143-3800-2
- Implosion (2012) ISBN 978-1-4143-1967-4
- The Invested Life (2012) ISBN 978-1-4143-7637-0
- Israel at War (2012) ISBN 978-1-4143-8374-3
- Enemies and Allies: An Unforgettable Journey Inside the Fast-Moving & Immensely Turbulent Modern Middle East (2021) ISBN 978-1-4964-5381-5
