= Alexander Liberman =

Ukrainian-American magazine editor (1912–1999)

- Born: Alexander Semeonovitch Liberman; September 4, 1912; Kyiv, Ukraine, then in Russian Empire
- Died: November 19, 1999 (aged 87); Miami, Florida, US
- Education: University School, Hastings, Sussex, England, 1921–22; St. Pirans School, Maidenhead, Berkshire, England, 1923–24; Ecole des Roches, 1924–1927; Sorbonne, 1927–1930, philosophy and mathematics, studied painting, under André Lhote, Paris, 1931; Ecole Speciale d'Architecture, Paris, 1931–32 (under Auguste Perret); École des Beaux-Arts in Paris, 1932–33
- Occupations: magazine editor, publisher painter, photographer, sculptor
- Employer(s): Vogue magazine (1943–); Condé Nast Publications (1960–1994)
- Title: Editorial Director
- Spouse(s): Hildegarde Sturm (1936–??); Tatiana Yacovleff du Plessix (1942–1991); Melinda Pechangco (1992–1999)
- Children: Francine du Plessix Gray stepdaughter, not adopted

Alexander Liberman, Gate of Hope, painted steel, 1972, University of Hawaii at Manoa

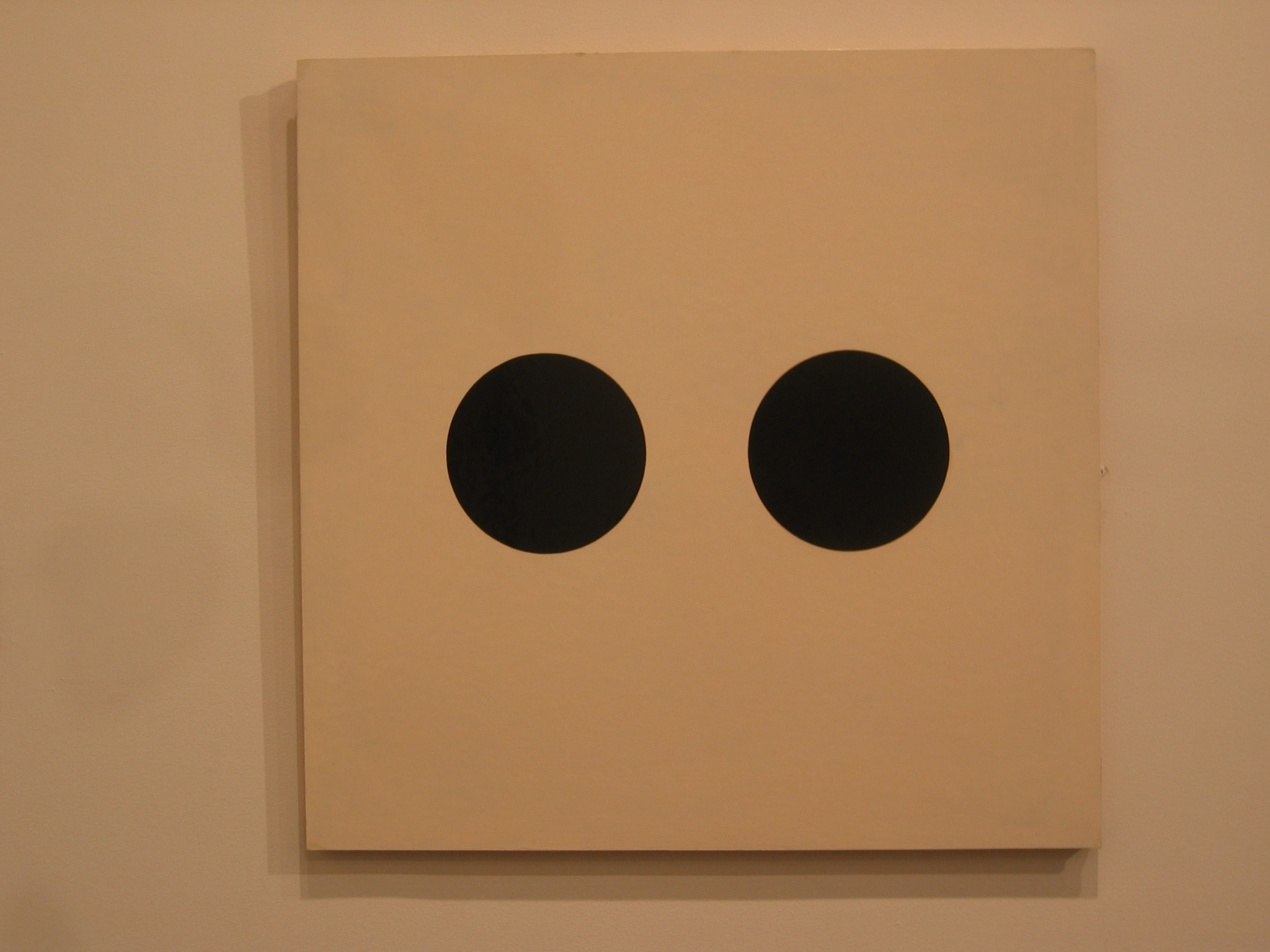
Liberman's Two Circles (1950) in the Metropolitan Museum of Art

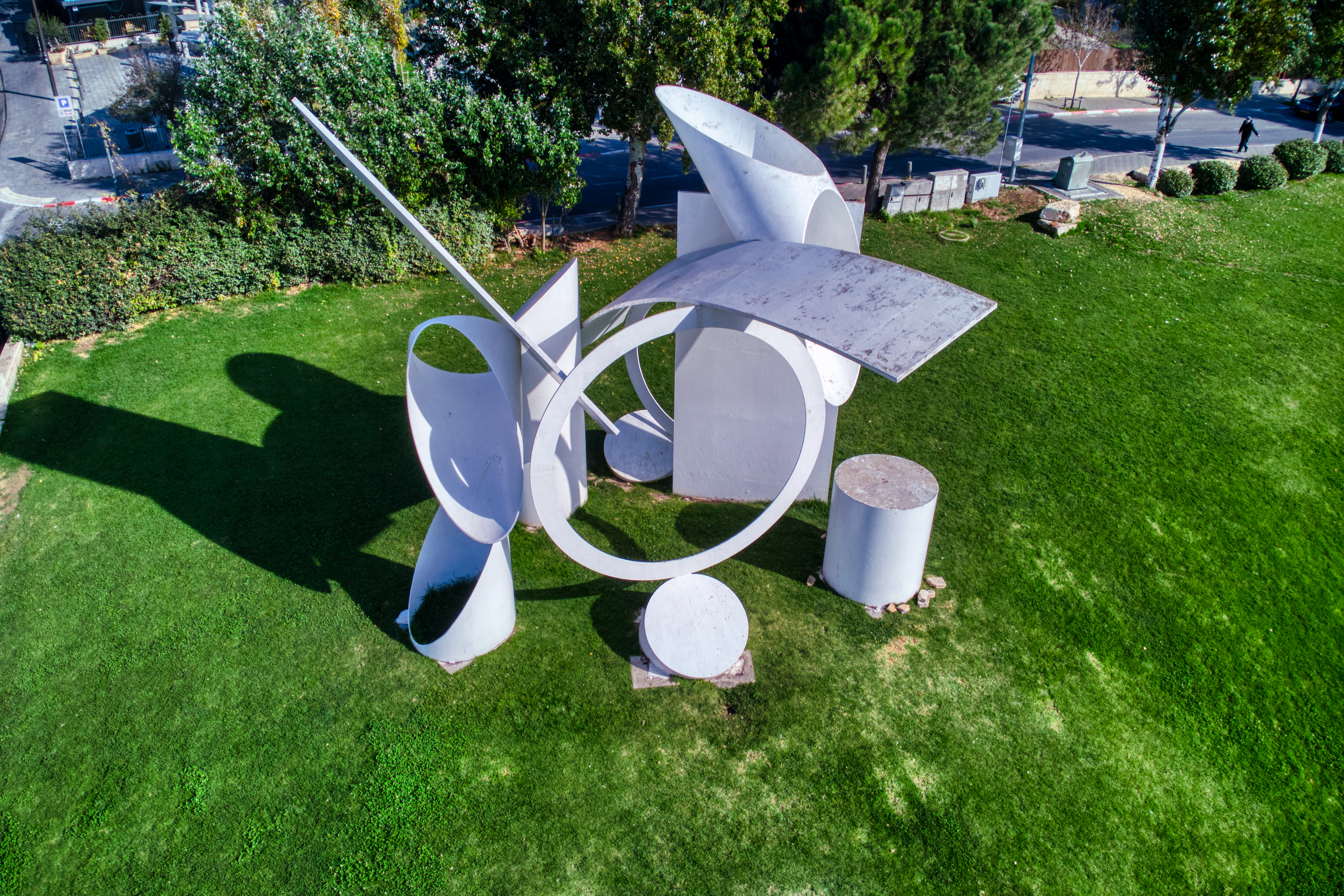
Liberman's Faith (1984) in Jerusalem

Alexander Semeonovitch Liberman (September 4, 1912 – November 19, 1999) was a Ukrainian-American magazine editor, publisher, painter, photographer, and sculptor. He held senior artistic positions during his 32 years at Condé Nast Publications.

== Life and career ==
Liberman was born into a Jewish family in Kyiv. When his father took a post advising the Soviet government, the family moved to Moscow. Life there became difficult, and his father secured permission from Lenin and the Politburo to take his son to London in 1921.

Young Liberman was educated in Ukraine, England, and France, where he took up life as a "White émigré" in Paris.

He began his publishing career in Paris in 1933–1936 with the early pictorial magazine Vu, where he worked under Lucien Vogel as art director, then managing editor, working with photographers such as Brassaï, André Kertész, and Robert Capa.

After emigrating to New York in 1941, he began working for Condé Nast Publications, rising to the position of editorial director, which he held from 1962 to 1994.

Only in the 1950s did Liberman take up painting and, later, metal sculpture. His highly recognizable sculptures are assembled from industrial objects (segments of steel I-beams, pipes, drums, and such), often painted in uniform bright colors. In a 1986 interview concerning his formative years as a sculptor and his aesthetic, Liberman said, "I think many works of art are screams, and I identify with screams." His massive work The Way, a 65 feet (20 m) x 102 feet (31 m) x 100 feet (30 m) structure, is made of eighteen salvaged steel oil tanks, and became a signature piece of Laumeier Sculpture Park, and a major landmark of St. Louis, Missouri.

Before finding success in painting and sculpture, Liberman was a photographer. Beginning in 1948, he spent his summers visiting and photographing a generation of modern European artists working in their studios including Georges Braque, Henri Matisse, Maurice Utrillo, Marc Chagall, Marcel Duchamp, Constantin Brancusi, and Pablo Picasso. In 1959 the Museum of Modern Art in New York City exhibited Liberman's photographs of artists and their studios. A year later the images were collected in Liberman's first book, The Artist in his Studio published by Viking Press (Kazanjian and Tomkins, 1993).

He was married briefly to Hildegarde Sturm (August 25, 1936), a model and competitive skier. His second wife (since 1942), Tatiana Yacovleff du Plessix Liberman (1906–1991), had been a childhood playmate and baby sitter. In 1941, they escaped together from occupied France, via Lisbon, to New York. She had operated a hat salon in Paris, then designed hats for Henri Bendel in Manhattan. She continued in millinery at Saks Fifth Avenue where she was billed as "Tatiana du Plessix" or "Tatiana of Saks", until the mid-1950s. In 1992, he married Melinda Pechangco, a nurse who had cared for Tatiana during an early illness. His stepdaughter, Francine du Plessix Gray, was a noted author.

== Career ==
Liberman started his career as a part-time design assistant to graphic artist A. M. Cassandre in Paris for approximately three months in 1930. He started working as a full-time painter in 1936. Then, he served in the French army in the 1940s but was rejected due to ulcers. He began taking photographs in 1949 and sculpting in 1958. Liberman was employed at Vogue magazine from 1941 for 58 years. He was hired by Condé Nast as an assistant to Vogue art director Mehemed Fehmy Agha against Agha's wishes and took over the position a year later. From 1941 to 1962, Liberman succeeded Agha as the magazine's art editor. As part of his work as Vogue art director from 1944 to 1961, he published Lee Miller's photographs of the Buchenwald gas chambers. In 1962, he was promoted to editorial director of all Condé Nast publications, United States and Europe, deputy chairman (editorial) from 1994 to 1999. Throughout his life, Liberman held numerous exhibitions of paintings and sculptures.

== Awards ==
- Gold Medal for Design, Exposition Internationale, Paris, 1937
- Doctor of Fine Arts: Rhode Island School of Design, Providence, 1980

== Publications ==
- La Femme Française dans l'Art, 1936 (in French)
- (editor and designer) The Art and Technique of Color Photography: A Treasury of Color Photographs by the Staff Photographers of Vogue, House & Garden, Glamour, introduction by Aline B. Louchheim, Simon & Schuster (New York), 1951
- The World in Vogue, Compiled by the Viking Press and Vogue; Editors for Viking: Bryan Holme and Katharine Tweed; Editors for Vogue: Jessica Daves and Alexander Liberman, New York : Viking Press, 1963
- The Artist in His Studio, foreword by James Thrall Soby, Viking Press (New York), 1960, revised edition, Random House (New York), 1988
- (photographer) Greece, Gods, and Art, introduction by Robert Graves, commentaries by Iris C. Love, Viking Press (New York), 1968
- Painting and Sculpture, 1950–1970, Garamond/Pridemark Press (Baltimore, Maryland), 1970. By James Pilgrim and Alexander Liberman. Exhibition catalogue for the Corcoran Gallery of Art
- Introduction to Vogue Book of Fashion Photography 1919–1979, by Polly Devlin (New York), 1979
- Marlene: An Intimate Photographic Memoir, Random House (New York), 1992
- (photographer) Campidoglio: Michelangelo's Roman Capitol, essay by Joseph Brodsky, Random House (New York), 1994
- (photographer) Then: Photographs, 1925–1995, preface by Calvin Tomkins, selected and designed by Charles Churchward, Random House (New York), 1995

== Works ==
- Prometheus (1964), Anderson Hall (University of Minnesota), Minneapolis, Minnesota
- Ritual II (1966), Lynden Sculpture Garden, Milwaukee, Wisconsin
- Orbits (1967), Lynden Sculpture Garden, Milwaukee, Wisconsin
- Axeltree (1967), Lynden Sculpture Garden, Milwaukee, Wisconsin
- Temple II (1964–1969), The Governor Nelson A. Rockefeller Empire State Plaza Art Collection, Albany, New York
- Adonai (1971), Storm King, New York
- Contact II (1972), Portland, Oregon
- Gate of Hope (1972), University of Hawaii at Manoa
- Above, Above (1972), Public Art Saint Paul's Western Sculpture Park
- Path (1973), Denison University, Granville, Ohio
- Argo (1974), Milwaukee, Wisconsin
- Phoenix (1974), Los Angeles County Museum of Art, Los Angeles, California
- Covenant (1975), University of Pennsylvania, Philadelphia, Pennsylvania
- Symbol (1978), Rockford, Illinois
- On High (1979), New Haven, Connecticut
- The Way (1980), Laumeier Sculpture Park, Greater St. Louis, Missouri
- Thrust (1980), Stamford, Connecticut
- Laocoon (1982), Pyramid Hill Sculpture and Art Park, Hamilton, OH
- Stargazer (1983), San Diego, California
- Olympic Iliad (1984), Seattle, Washington
- Faith (1984), Jerusalem, Israel
- Galaxy (1985), Leadership Square, Oklahoma City, Oklahoma
- Trope I (1986), Norfolk, Virginia
- Torre II (1989), Pyramid Hill Sculpture and Art Park, Hamilton, OH
- Abracadabra (1992), Pyramid Hill Sculpture and Art Park, Hamilton, OH
- Archway (1997), Museum SAN, Wonju, South Korea

== Collections ==
Liberman's work is held in the following collections:

- Metropolitan Museum of Art
- Storm King Art Center
- Hirshhorn Museum and Sculpture Garden
- Pyramid Hill Sculpture Park and Museum
- Tate Gallery
- Guggenheim Museum
- Akron Art Museum
- Frederik Meijer Gardens & Sculpture Park

== Sources ==
- Lucy Sisman, "Alex Liberman: Ways of Looking at Design," (2013)
- Calvin Tomkins and Dodie Kazanjian, Alex: The Life of Alexander Liberman (1993)
- Radford, Georgia and Warren Radford, "Sculpture in the Sun, Hawaii's Art for Open Spaces", University of Hawaii Press, 1978, 94.
- Francine du Plessix Gray, Them.
- Obituaries:
  - The Guardian, Lucy Sisman, Alexander Liberman: The Inspired Mastermind Behind Vogue for More than 20 Years (6 Dec. 1999)
  - New York Post (20 Nov. 1999) (business section)
  - Calvin Tomkins, "Balancing Act", New Yorker (6 Dec. 1999).
- Maier, Thomas (1997). Newhouse: All the Glitter, Power, and Glory of America's Richest Media Empire and the Secretive Man Behind It. Big Earth Publishing. ISBN 978-1-55566-191-5.
- Roiphe, Katie (2005-05-12). "Lifestyles of the Rich and FamousFrancine du Plessix Gray's glamorous, forgetful parents". Slate.com. Archived from the original on 9 October 2008.
- Arts Magazine, June, 1977, Frederic Tuten, "Alexander Liberman: Aquatints, Paintings, Photographs and Sculpture."
- Entertainment Weekly, December 1, 1995, Rebecca Ascher-Walsh, review of Then: Photographs 1925-1995, p. 68.
- The New York Times, May 12, 1979, Marie Winn "Liberman Staying in Vogue.".
- Photo Magazine, July, 1982, "Alexander Liberman: Photographs of Artists."
- School Library Journal, April, 2004, Wendy Lukehart, review of The Artist in His Studio, p. 64.
- Time magazine, February 7, 1994, "Retiring, Alexander Liberman", p. 21.
- Women's Wear Daily, February 6, 2004, Sharon Edelson, "Liberman's Art Direction", p. 10.
- Los Angeles Times, November 20, 1999, p. A23.
- Mediaweek, November 22, 1999, Lisa Granatstein, p. 4.
- New York Times, November 20, 1999, p. C15.
- Newsweek International, November 29, 1999, p. 4.
- The Times (London, England), November 27, 1999.
- The Washington Post, November 20, 1999, p. B7
- Booklist, February 1, 1995, Brad Hooper, review of Campidoglio: Michelangelo's Roman Capitol, p. 983.
- Art in America, November–December, 1977
- Carter Ratcliff, "Alexander Liberman at Storm King"; January, 1994
- Carter Ratcliff, "Platonic Purposes", discusses author's artwork, p. 92; October, 2004
- Jonathan Gilmore, "Alexander Liberman at Ameringer & Yohe", p. 149.
- "Alexander Liberman at Storm King" by Carter Ratcliff in Art in America (New York), November/December 1977
- "Liberman Staying in Vogue" by Marie Winn in The New York Times, 12 May 1979
