= Embrace (sculpture) =

Sculpture by Sorel Etrog

Coordinates: 43°10′34.1″N 87°56′9.8″W

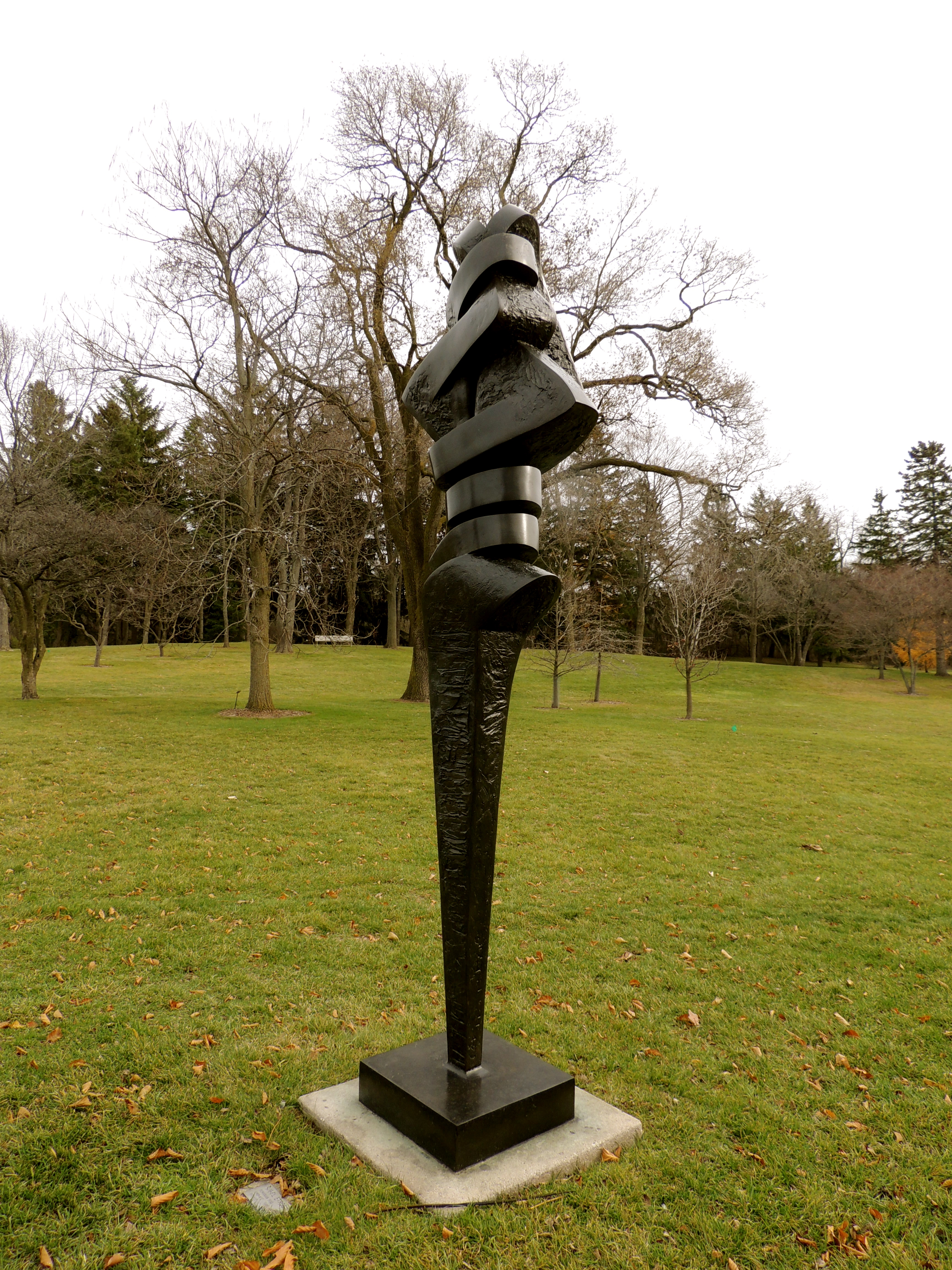
- Artist: Sorel Etrog
- Year: 1966
- Type: bronze
- Dimensions: 280 cm × 69 cm × 51 cm (109 in × 27 in × 20 in)
- Location: Lynden Sculpture Garden; Milwaukee, Wisconsin

Embrace is a public art work by artist Sorel Etrog located at the Lynden Sculpture Garden near Milwaukee, Wisconsin. The abstract sculpture is made of bronze; it is installed on a base on the lawn.
