= Orizzontale =

Sculpture by Aldo Calo

Coordinates: 43°10′36.2″N 87°56′11.0″W

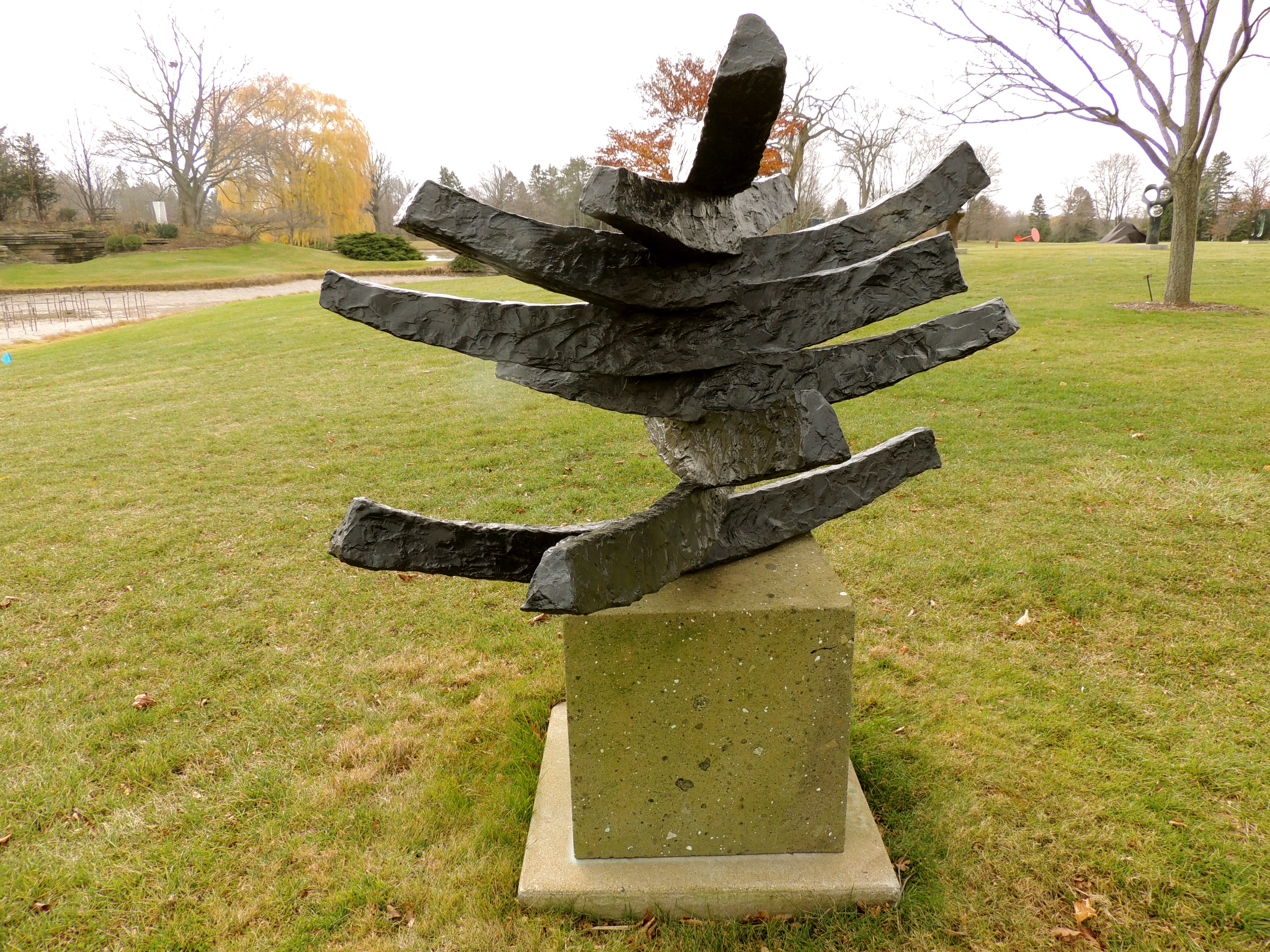
- Artist: Aldo Calo
- Year: 1964
- Type: bronze
- Dimensions: 99 cm × 190 cm × 150 cm (39 in × 74 in × 61 in)
- Location: Lynden Sculpture Garden; Milwaukee, Wisconsin

Orizzontale is a public art work by artist Aldo Calo located at the Lynden Sculpture Garden near Milwaukee, Wisconsin. The abstract sculpture consists of stacked geometricized slabs of bronze; it is installed on a base on the lawn.
