= Queen of Sheba (sculpture) =

Public art work by Alexander Archipenko

Coordinates: 43.1770°N 87.9363°W

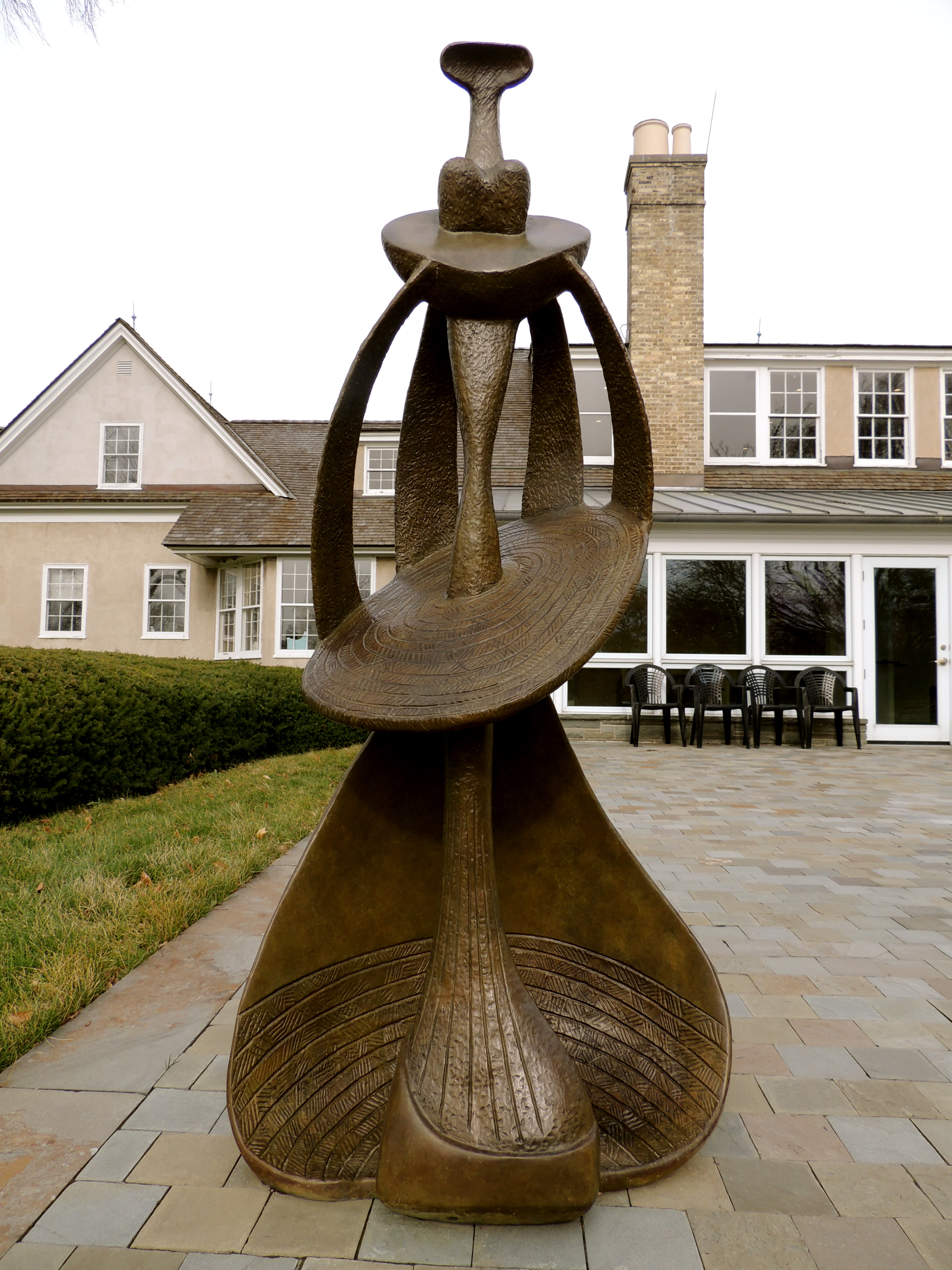
- Artist: Alexander Archipenko
- Year: 1961
- Type: bronze
- Dimensions: 170 cm × 71 cm × 46 cm (66 in × 28 in × 18 in)
- Location: Lynden Sculpture Garden; Milwaukee, Wisconsin

Queen of Sheba is a public art work by artist Alexander Archipenko located at the Lynden Sculpture Garden near Milwaukee, Wisconsin. The abstract bronze sculpture includes sloping concave forms, vaguely female curves, and a rounded crown; it is installed on the patio.
