= Rhythm in Space =

Public sculpture in Milwaukee, Wisconsin

Coordinates: 43°10′35.5″N 87°56′12.8″W

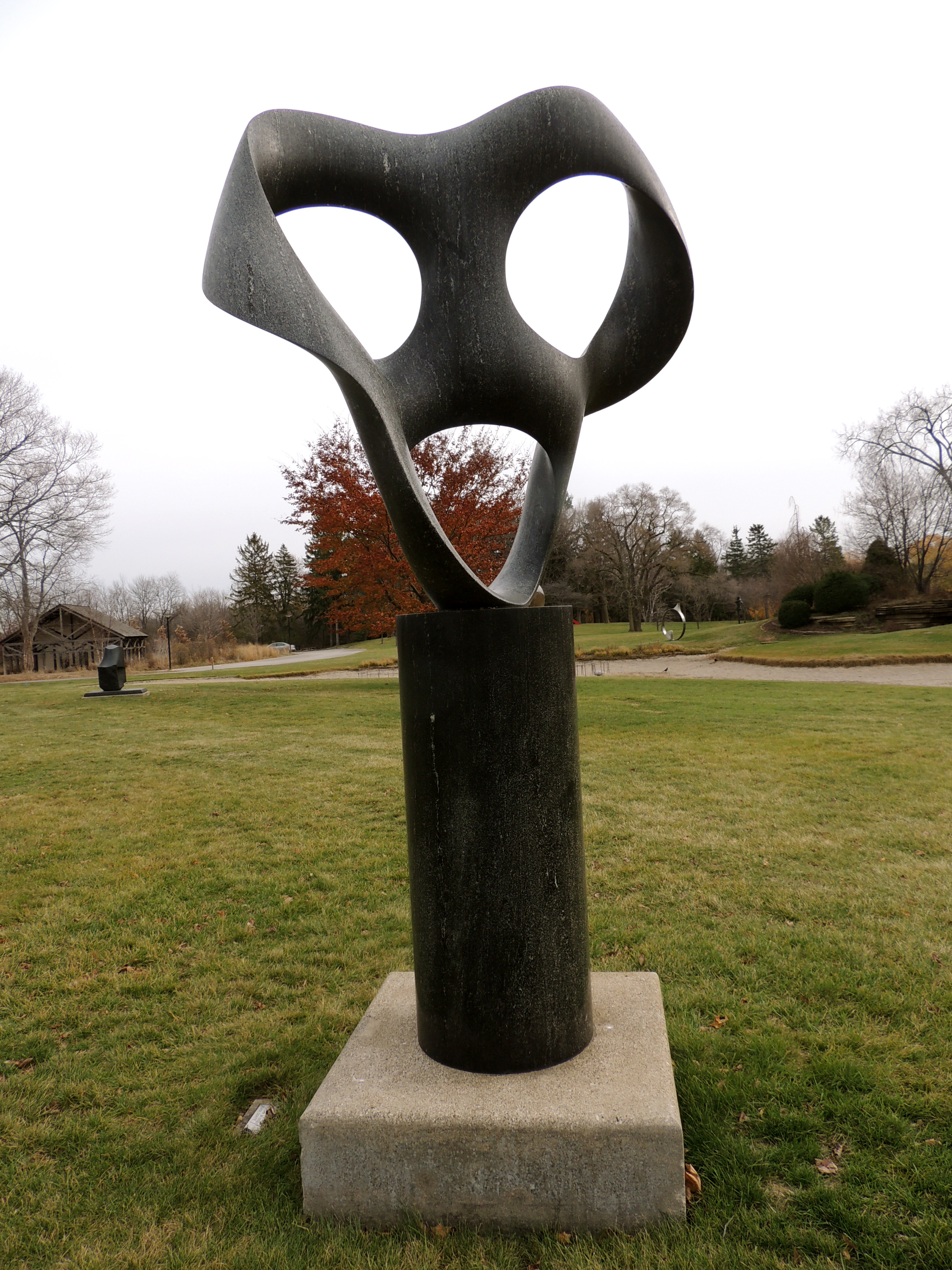
- Artist: Max Bill
- Year: 1967
- Type: black diorite
- Dimensions: 260 cm × 150 cm × 91 cm (103 in × 60 in × 36 in)
- Location: Lynden Sculpture Garden; Milwaukee, Wisconsin

Rhythm in Space is a public art work by artist Max Bill located at the Lynden Sculpture Garden near Milwaukee, Wisconsin. The abstract sculpture is a column topped by three overlapping rings with the outer edges contiguous to the inner ones; it is installed on the lawn.
