= Francine du Plessix Gray =

French-American writer and literary critic (1930–2019)

- Born: Francine du Plessix; September 25, 1930; Warsaw, Poland
- Died: January 13, 2019 (aged 88); Manhattan, New York City, New York, United States
- Citizenship: France, United States
- Education: Bryn Mawr College 1948–50; Black Mountain College summers 1951–52; Barnard College (BA) 1952
- Occupation: Author
- Political party: Democratic
- Spouse: Cleve Gray
- Children: Thaddeus Ives Gray; Luke Alexander Gray
- Parent(s): Bertrand Jochaud du Plessix; Tatiana Yakovleva du Plessix Liberman; Alexander Liberman (stepfather)

Francine du Plessix Gray (September 25, 1930 – January 13, 2019) was a French-American Pulitzer Prize–nominated writer and literary critic.

== Early life and education ==
She was born on September 25, 1930, in Warsaw, Poland, where her father, Vicomte Bertrand Jochaud du Plessix, was a French diplomat – the commercial attaché. She spent her early years in Paris, where a milieu of mixed cultures and a multilingual family (French father and Russian mother) influenced her. Her father, then a sub-lieutenant in the Free French Air Force died in 1940, shot down near Gibraltar.

Her mother, Tatiana Iacovleff du Plessix (1906–1991), had come to France as a refugee from Bolshevik Russia, and ended an engagement to Vladimir Mayakovsky in 1928, before marrying du Plessix. During her widowhood, she once again became a refugee, escaping occupied France via Lisbon to New York in 1940 or 1941 with Francine and Alexander Liberman (1912–1999). In 1942, she married Liberman, another White Russian émigré, whom she had known in Paris as a child. (During his love affair with Liberman's mother, her uncle, Alexandre Yacovleff, had recruited Tatiana to keep the boy occupied.) He was a noted artist and later a longtime editorial director of Vogue magazine and then of Condé Nast Publications. The Libermans were socially prominent in media, art and fashion circles.

For the first six months in the United States, young Francine lived with her mother's father (whom she had never met) in Rochester, New York, while her mother settled in. She grew up in New York City and was naturalized a U.S. citizen in 1952. She was a scholarship student at Spence School, where she fainted in the library from malnutrition. Her mother learned that she had not been eating the meals the housekeeper prepared for her. She attended Bryn Mawr College for two years, and earned a B.A. in philosophy at Barnard College in 1952.

== Career ==
From 1952 to 1954, Gray worked as a night-desk reporter for United Press International in New York City. From 1954 to 1955, she was an editorial assistant for Réalités, a French magazine, Paris. She became a freelance writer in 1955. From 1964 to 1966, she was a book editor for Art in America in New York City. In 1968, she became a staff writer for The New Yorker with Robert Gottlieb as her editor. In 1975, she was a distinguished visiting professor at City College of New York. In 1981, she was a visiting lecturer at Saybrook College, Yale University. Since 1983, she was an adjunct professor for the School of Fine Arts at Columbia University. From 1986, she was a Ferris professor at Princeton University. She became an Annenberg fellow at Brown University in 1997.

She was a member of the American Academy of Arts and Letters, Authors Guild, Institute of Humanities at New York University, and International PEN.

== Personal life ==
On 23 April 1957, she married the painter Cleve Gray and until his death they lived together in Connecticut. They had two sons, Luke and Thaddeus Ives Gray. She was a great friend of Philip Roth but then they were almost enemies. Francine du Plessix Gray died on January 13, 2019, in Manhattan.

== Awards ==
- Putnam Creative Writing Award from Barnard College, 1952
- National Catholic Book Award from Catholic Press Association, 1971, for Divine Disobedience: Profiles in Catholic Radicalism
- Front Page Award from Newswomen's Club of New York, 1972, for Hawaii: The Sugar-Coated Fortress
- LL.D.

City University of New York, 1981
Oberlin College, 1985
University of Santa Clara, 1985
St. Mary's College of California
University of Hartford

- Guggenheim fellow 1991–92
- National Book Critics Circle Award for autobiography, 2006, for Them: A Memoir of Parents.

== Books ==
- Divine disobedience: profiles in Catholic radicalism. New York: Knopf, 1970.
- Hawaii: the sugar-coated fortress. New York: Random House, 1972.
- Lovers and tyrants. New York: Simon & Schuster, 1976.
- World without end: a novel. New York: Simon & Schuster, 1981.
- October blood. New York: Simon & Schuster, 1985.
- ADAM & EVE and the CITY. Simon & Schuster, 1987.
- Soviet women: walking the tightrope. New York: Doubleday, 1990.
- Rage and fire: a life of Louise Colet, pioneer feminist, literary star, Flaubert's muse. New York: Simon & Schuster, 1994.
- At home with the Marquis de Sade: a life. New York, NY: Simon & Schuster, 1998.
- Simone Weil. New York: Viking Press, 2001.
- Them: a memoir of parents. New York: Penguin Press. 2005. ISBN 978-0-14-303719-4.
- Madame de Staël. Atlas & Co. 2008. ISBN 978-1-934633-17-5.
