= Bernard Kirschenbaum =

American artist

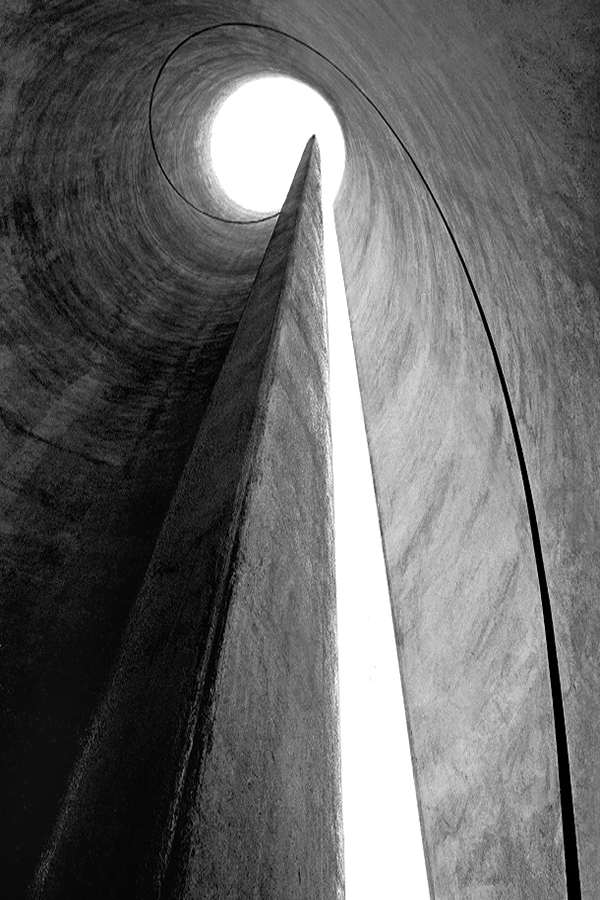
Bernard Kirschenbaum. "Spiral" Malmö 1987.

Bernard Kirschenbaum (born September 3, 1924 in New York City - d. February 16, 2016) was an American artist.

== Biography ==
Kirschenbaum received his bachelor's degree in design from the Chicago Institute of Design in Chicago in 1952.

In 1974 he created "Twist for Max" and in 1976 "Way Four" which are on permanent display at the Lynden Sculpture Garden in Milwaukee, Wisconsin.

During the years 1985-91 he was a professor at the Royal Institute of Fine Arts in Stockholm. Kirschenbaum is represented in among other collections the Gothenburg Art Museum .

Kirschenbaum's work is represented in New York City by Postmasters.
