= Marta Pan =

Hungarian–born French sculptor (1923–2008)

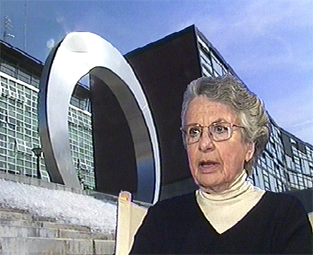
- Marta Pan discussing her work, 1995
- Born: 12 June 1923; Budapest, Hungary
- Died: 12 October 2008 (aged 85); Paris, France
- Known for: Sculpture

Marta Pan (12 June 1923, Budapest – 12 October 2008, Paris) was a French abstract sculptor of Hungarian origin.

== Early life ==
Marta Pan was born in Budapest, Hungary in 1923. She studied art at the Ecole des Beaux-Arts in Budapest.

== Work ==
Pan's sculptures are highly concerned with balance, symmetry, and geometry. She often created her works so that they were site-specific and worked with the surrounding environment. In 1946 Pan moved to Paris, where she met Constantin Brâncuşi and Fernand Léger. In 1952 she married André Wogenscky, who was a studio assistant to Le Corbusier. Her early sculptures were highly influenced by the architecture of Le Corbusier. In 1956, Pan created Le Teck, which consisted of two moveable parts. The choreographer Maurice Béjart later created a ballet, also entitled Le Teck, inspired directly by Pan's sculpture. Béjart's ballet was premiered on the roof of Le Corbusier's Unité d'Habitation building in Marseille, France. Until 1960, all of Pan's sculptures consisted of this two-part construction method, which allowed one piece to be moved, thus altering the work. In 1990 she made Celle floating sculpture in Italy for the Gori collection - Fattoria di Celle.

== Death ==
Pan died on 12 October 2008 in Paris, France.

== Public collections ==
Pan's work can be seen in a number of public institutions and locations, including:

- Floating Sculpture (1973), Dallas City Hall, Dallas (Texas), USA
- Sculpture flottante, Otterlo (1960), Kröller-Müller Museum, Otterlo, Netherlands
- La Perspective (1992), Musée de la Ville de Saint-Quentin-en-Yvelines (Yvelines, Île-de-France), France
- Floating Sculpture No. 3 (1972), Lynden Sculpture Garden, Milwaukee (Wisconsin), USA
- Signe infini (1993), intersection of autoroutes A46 and A6 at Ambérieux (Rhône, Rhône-Alpes), France.
- Celle Floating Sculpture (1990), Collezione Gori Fattoria di Celle - Collezione Gori, Italy

== Recognition ==
In 2001 Pan was awarded the Praemium Imperiale award for Sculpture from the Japan Art Society. Pan's work was included in the 2021 exhibition Women in Abstraction at the Centre Pompidou.

== Selected works ==
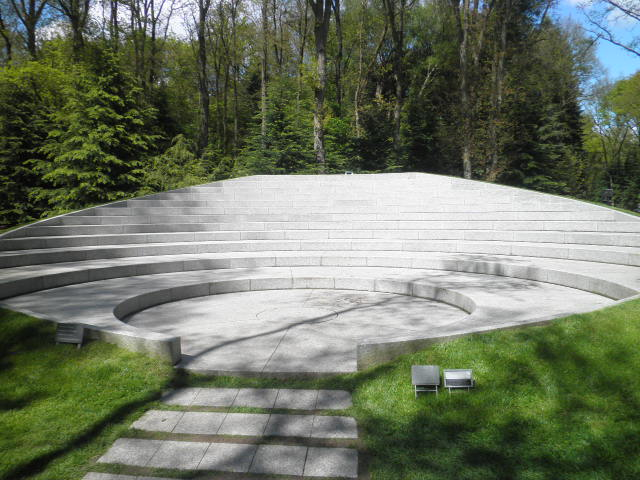
Amphitheatre

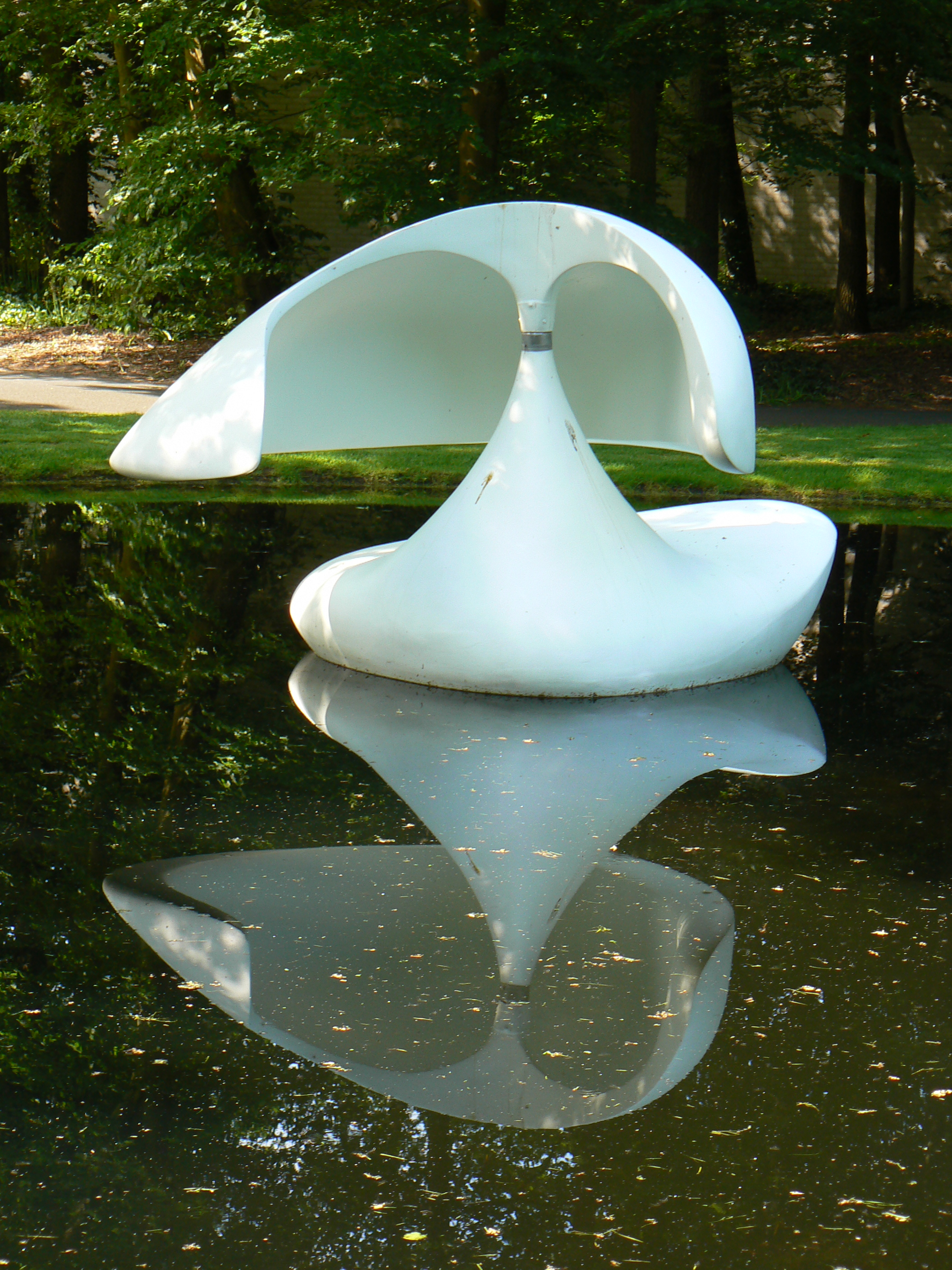
Floating sculpture

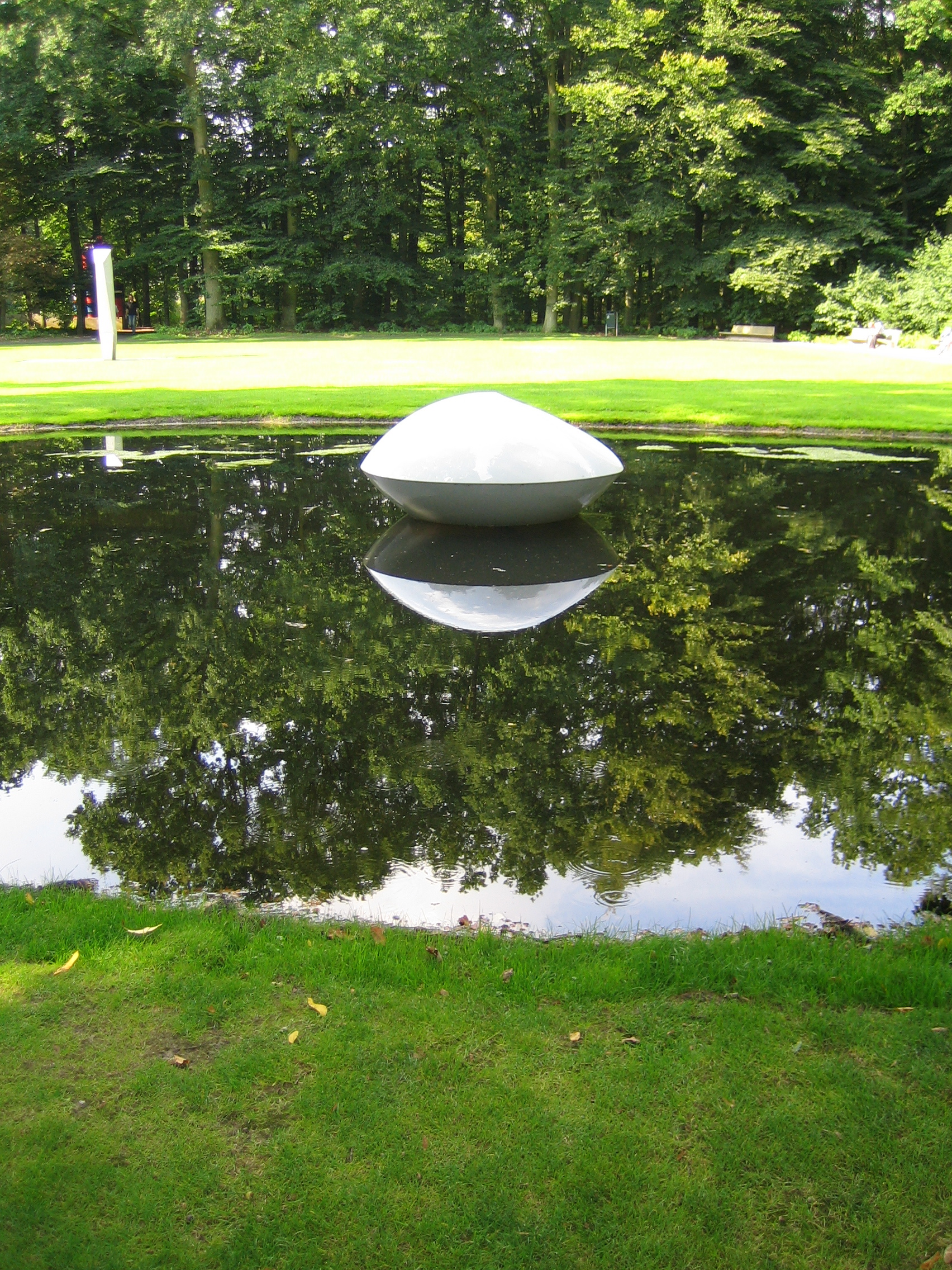
Floating sculpture
