= Sea Form (Atlantic) =

1964 bronze sculpture by Barbara Hepworth

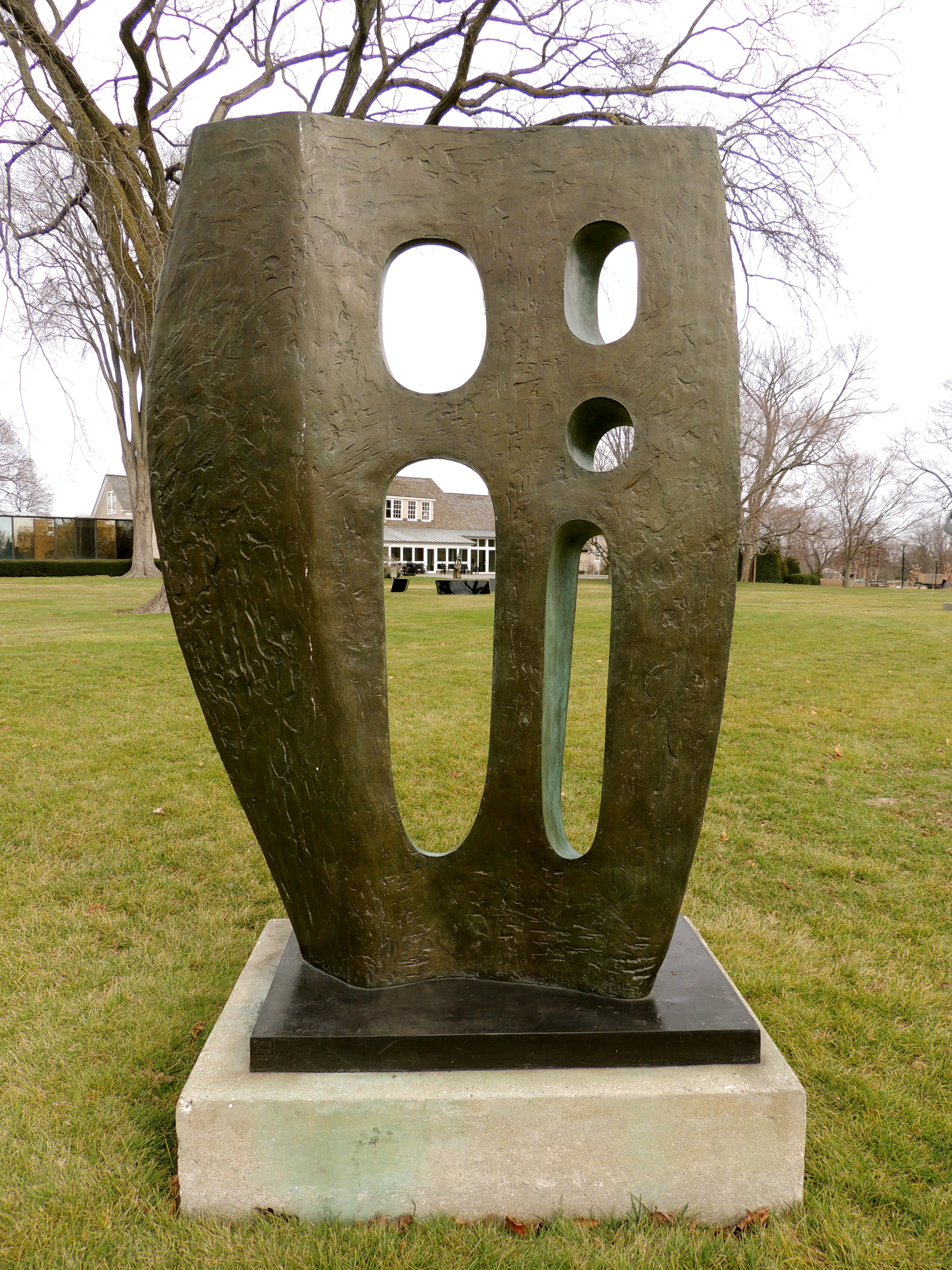
Barbara Hepworth, Sea Form (Atlantic), 1964, in the Lynden Sculpture Garden, Milwaukee, Wisconsin

Sea Form (Atlantic) (BH 362) is a 1964 bronze sculpture by English artist Barbara Hepworth. It measures 204 cm × 107 cm × 73 cm (80 in × 42 in × 29 in).

The sculpture comprises a single large curved free-standing form, similar to a shield, with contrasting rough and smooth surfaces with brown or green patination, and five pierced apertures that resemble holes in a sea shell. Like Hepworth's Single Form (1961), it was based on Neolithic standing stones at Chûn Castle hillfort site in West Cornwall. It was part of a series of sculptures that took inspiration from the cliffs and caves on the coastline near Porthcurno on the Penwith peninsula. Other works in the series include Curved Form (Bryher) (1961), Oval Form (Trezion) (1961–63) and Rock Form (Porthcurno) (1964).

It was cast at the Morris Singer foundry in London in 1964, in an edition of 6+1 (six for sale, and one artist's copy). A cast was exhibited at the Battersea Park sculpture exhibition in 1966.

Three of the casts are now on display in public collections, and three held by private collectors.

- Cast 1/6 was bought through Gimpel Fils by James H. Clark and his wife Lillian Clark, and donated to the Dallas Museum of Art and Museum of Fine Arts, Dallas, where it had been held since 1965.
- Cast 2/6 was sold through the Marlborough Gerson Gallery in 1968 to Hunt Food and Industries.
- Cast 3/6 was sold through Gimpel Fils in 1967 to the City of Norwich Museum, with funding from the Gulbenkian Foundation and the Victoria and Albert Museum, and it remains on display in Norfolk.
- Cast 4/6 was sold through Marlborough Gerson Gallery to Harry Lynde Bradley, and is displayed in the Lynden Sculpture Garden near Milwaukee, Wisconsin, from the Bradley Foundation collection where it is installed on the lawn. (43°10′35.0″N 87°56′15.2″W)
- Cast 5/6 was sold to J.G. Davies in May 1968.
- Cast 6/6 was sold through Gimpel Fils in 1966 to Mr & Mrs Samuel G. Rautbord of Chicago; it was sold at Christie's in 1998, exhibited at Chatsworth House in 2015, and sold for £3.5m at Christie's in 2016.
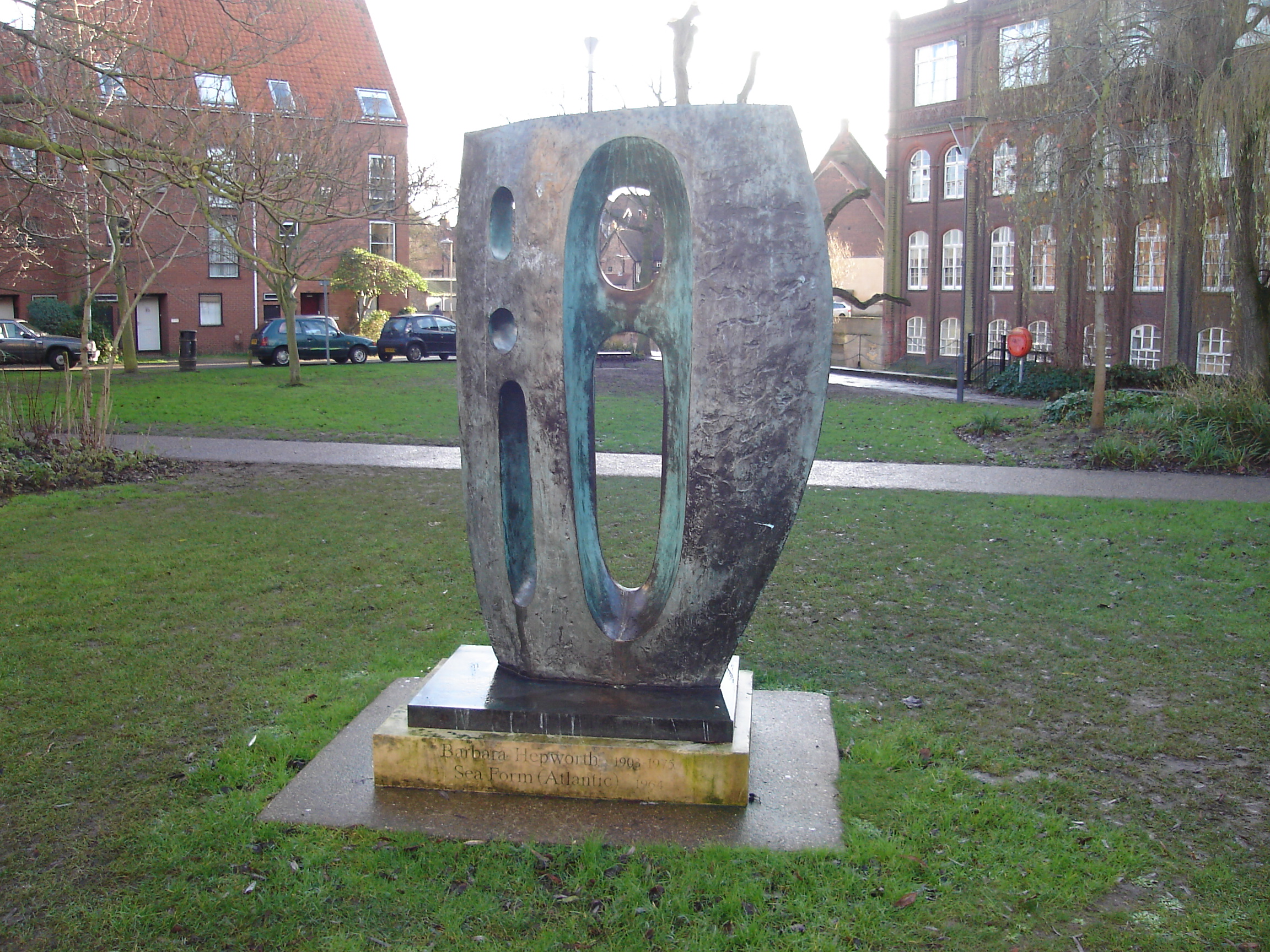
Norwich

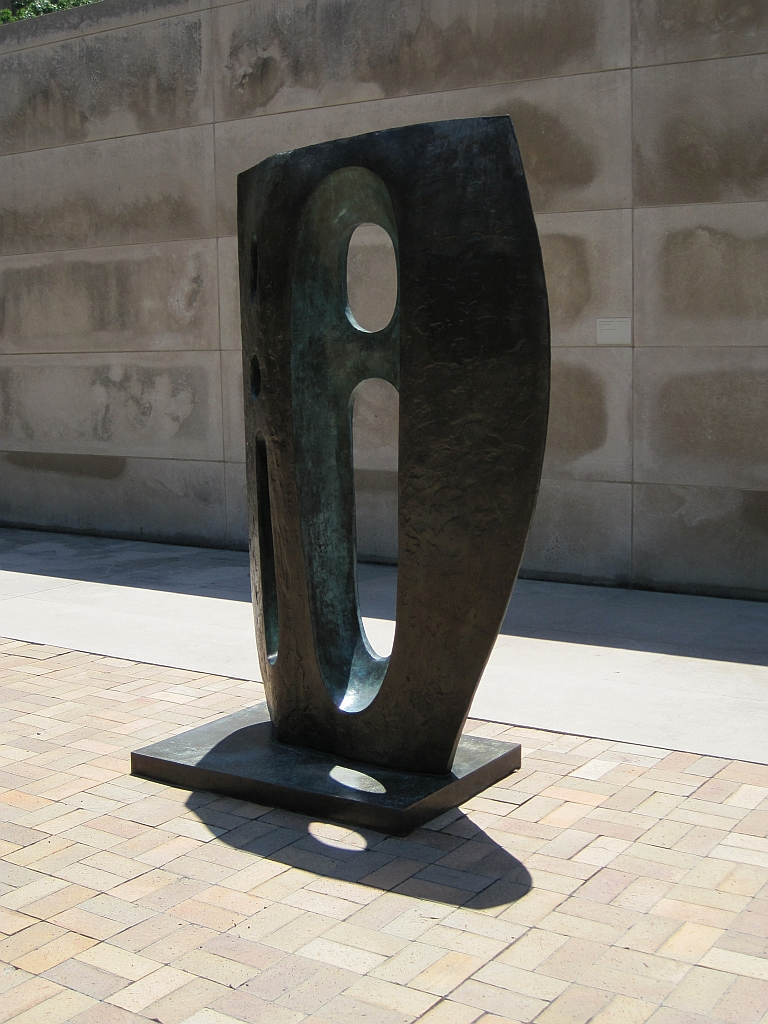
Dallas
