= Epicenter (book) =

2006 non-fiction book by Joel C. Rosenberg

Epicenter: Why Current Rumblings in the Middle East Will Change Your Future
- Author: Joel C. Rosenberg
- Language: English
- Genre: Christian living, non-fiction
- Publisher: Tyndale House Publishers, Inc
- Publication date: September 1, 2006
- Publication place: United States
- Media type: Print (Hardback, paperback) and e-book
- Pages: 336 pages
- ISBN: 1414311354

Epicenter: Why Current Rumblings in the Middle East Will Change Your Future is a 2006 non-fiction Christian book by political column poster Joel C. Rosenberg. The book was released on September 1, 2006 through Tyndale House Publishers, Inc and concerns how current events in the Middle East and other places in the world resemble prophecies from the Book of Ezekiel.

An updated version of the book entitled Epicenter 2.0 was released in 2008 in paperback.

== Synopsis ==
In Epicenter Rosenberg examines current events in Russia, the Middle East, and other countries, as well as interviewing various leaders from Israel, Palestine, and Russia. Rosenberg then takes this information, along with his interviews and experience with events and leaders in Washington, D.C. to compare these changes and events to prophecies made in the Book of Ezekiel. He argues that these are signs of upcoming change, not all of which might be positive, that will change the world completely.

== Other media ==
=== Conference ===
In 2008 Rosenberg began hosting a series of yearly conferences titled Epicenter that discussed events in the Middle East. The first conference was held in Jerusalem, Israel and stated that their primary purpose was to educate Christians "as to the serious threats facing the Jewish State and her neighbors, and mobilized Christians around the world to pray for the peace of Jerusalem and provide humanitarian relief to the poor, needy and those suffering from war and terrorism".

=== DVD ===
In 2007 Rosenberg released a one-hour documentary that discussed his theories in Epicenter and the potential conflicts in the world.

== Reception ==
Of the audiobook, AudioFile commented that while Rosenberg was a skilled writer, when it came to narrating the book he was "the wrong person for the job."
