= Epicenter (sculpture) =

American public artwork by Ernest Carl Shaw

Coordinates: 43°10′32.9″N 87°56′8.8″W

- Artist: Ernest Carl Shaw
- Year: 1976
- Type: steel
- Dimensions: 300 cm × 140 cm × 76 cm (120 in × 57 in × 30 in)
- Location: Lynden Sculpture Garden; Milwaukee, Wisconsin
- Owner: Bradley Family Foundation

Epicenter is a public art work by artist Ernest Carl Shaw located at the Lynden Sculpture Garden near Milwaukee, Wisconsin. The sculpture is an abstract form made of several steel bars set at angles; it is rust-colored and installed on the lawn.

== See also ==
- III Columns
