= Argo (Liberman) =

Public artwork by Alexander Liberman

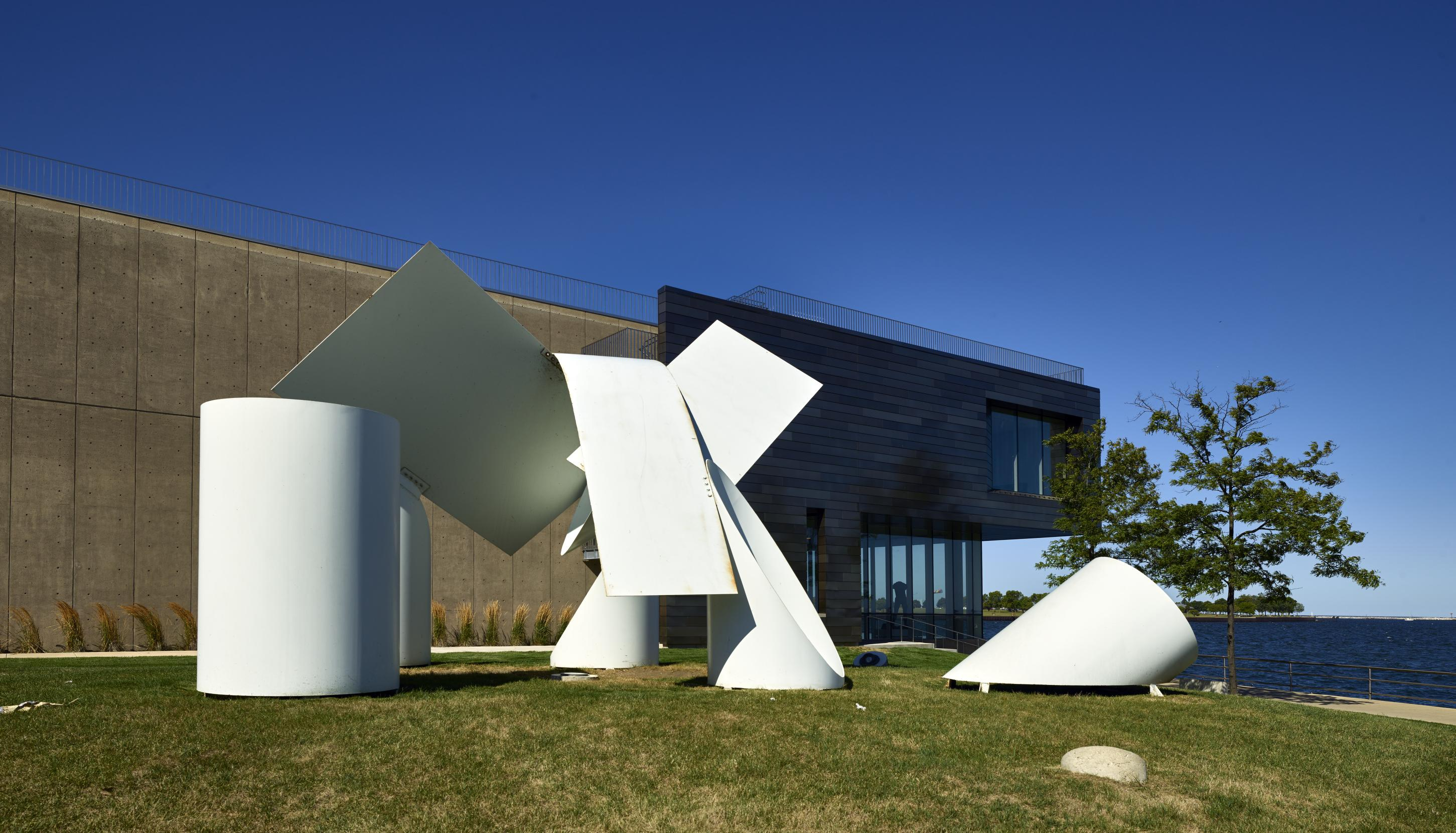
- Artist: Alexander Liberman
- Year: 1974
- Type: Steel Sculpture
- Dimensions: 460 cm × 940 cm × 1,100 cm (180 in × 372 in × 432 in)
- Location: Milwaukee Art Museum; Milwaukee, Wisconsin; 43°2′24.411″N 87°53′47.162″W

Argo is a public artwork by Russian-American artist Alexander Liberman located on the south lawn of the Milwaukee Art Museum, which is in Milwaukee, Wisconsin, U.S.. The artwork was made in 1974 from steel cylinders painted with a reflective white epoxy finish. It measures 15 feet (4.6 m) high by 31 feet (9.4 m) wide.

== History ==
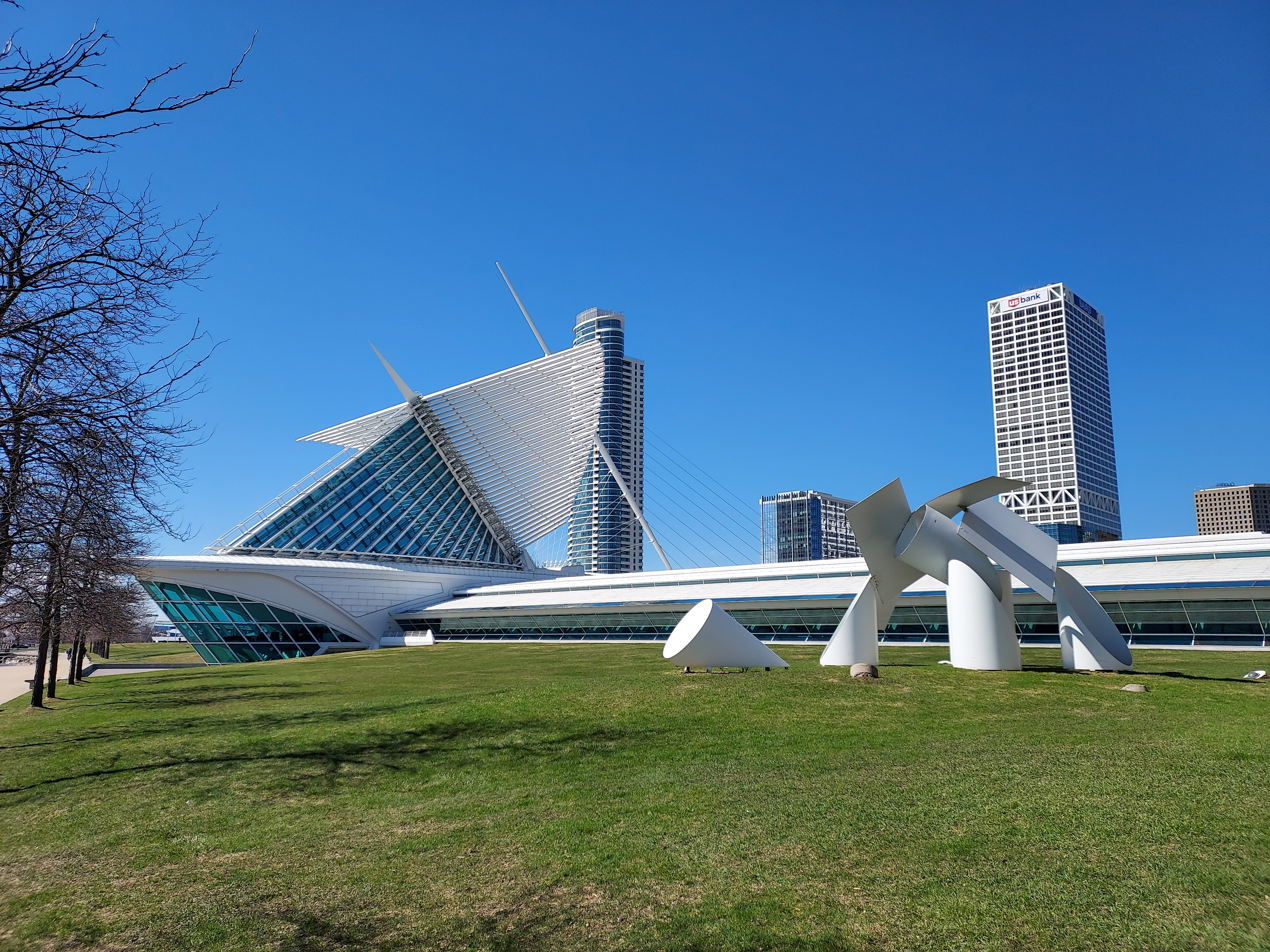
Argo on the grounds of the Milwaukee Art Museum in 2025

Initially during the summer of 1974, the sculpture was located in Newport, Rhode Island. Mounted a large contemporary outdoor exhibition entitled "Monumenta". Alexander Liberman's Argo, sited on the edge of the water, received favorable notice and reviews.

Mrs. Harry Lynde Bradley purchased the sculpture because she determined it would complement the architecture of the newly enlarged Milwaukee Art Center, which had been largely financed by the Bradley Foundation. Argo became the first sculpture on the grounds of the museums new wing.
