= Lynden Sculpture Garden =

Milwaukee, Wisconsin collection assembled 1962 to 1978

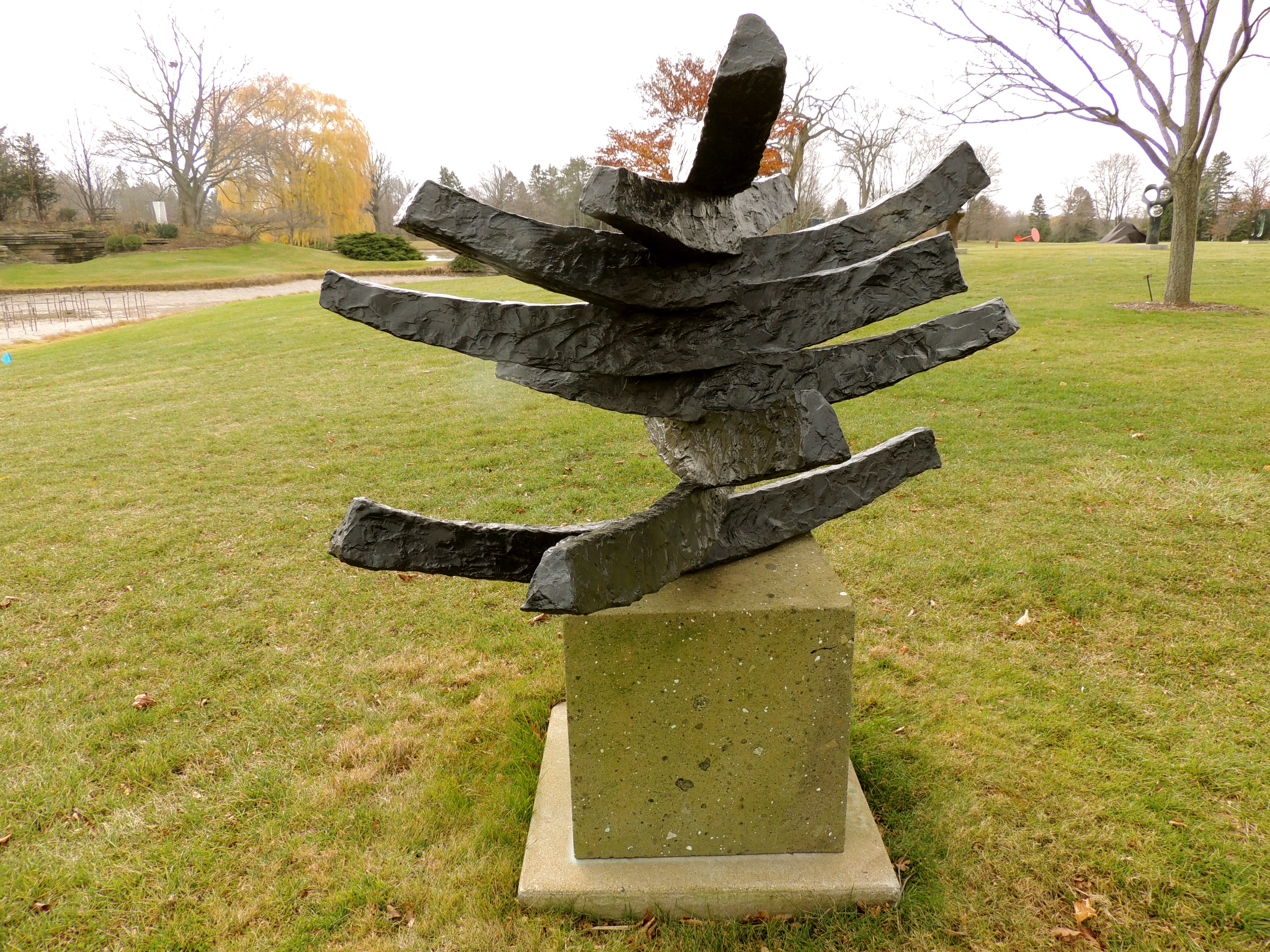
- Orizzontale by Aldo Calo
- Interactive map of Lynden Sculpture Garden
- Location: River Hills, Wisconsin
- Coordinates: 43°10′37″N 87°56′9″W
- Area: 40 acres (16.19 ha)
- Opened: 2010
- Owner: Bradley Family Foundation
- Website: lyndensculpturegarden.org

The Lynden Sculpture Garden is an outdoor sculpture park and cultural institution located in River Hills, a suburb of Milwaukee, Wisconsin, on the former estate of industrialist Harry Lynde Bradley and his wife, Margaret "Peg" Bradley.

Originally an estate known as Lynden, the property later became known as the Bradley Sculpture Garden before opening to the public as the Lynden Sculpture Garden in 2010. It is home to the collection of more than fifty monumental sculptures collected by Peg Bradley between 1962 and 1978.

The collection features works by Alexander Archipenko, Deborah Butterfield, Michelle Grabner, Barbara Hepworth, Alexander Liberman, Henry Moore, Isamu Noguchi, Marta Pan, Tony Smith, Mark di Suvero, and others across forty acres of park, lake, and woodland.

== History ==
Harry L. Bradley, an inventor and industrialist, founded the Allen-Bradley Company with his brother Lynde in 1904, building it into one of the state's most successful manufacturing concerns. Harry married Peg in April 1926. In 1928, they purchased property about 10 miles north of downtown Milwaukee and named it "Lynden."

The Bradleys took the nearly 40 acres of flat farmland and, with the help of Chicago landscape architects Langford & Moreau, created an English country park with gently rolling hills, trees and flower beds. The lake and the rustic bridge spanning the water were designed to match Harry Bradley's memories of the municipal grounds in Kansas City where he swam as a boy.

In April 1934, the Bradleys hired Carl Urban, a fourth generation gardener, to supervise the crew and the planting of the garden beds and trees. Trained in Germany and the United States, Urban observed that when he first saw the acreage behind the house it consisted mainly of corn fields with horses, sheep, goats and thirteen oak trees. Over time, nearly 4,000 trees were planted on the property—several varieties of elms as well as Norwegian, Austrian and Scotch pines, Norway maples, a Danish plum tree, seven varieties of birch trees and Kentucky coffee trees. Urban remained on the staff and resided in the apartment in the barn until his death in 1991.

Further plans to construct a botanical garden on the site were derailed by the outbreak of World War II. In 1962, Peg Bradley began collecting the contemporary monumental sculptures that secured Lynden. She collected actively until her death in 1978.

The original farmhouse, built in the 1860s, was enlarged to accommodate Harry, Peg, and their daughter Jane. Local architect Fitzhugh Scott provided drawings for the alterations to the barn, the bathhouse, and a diving pier and slide. Several decades later architect David Kahler designed an addition at the west end of the house for an indoor swimming pool, providing more space for the Bradleys’ growing art collection.

== Opening to the public ==
In 2009, the board of the Bradley Family Foundation elected to open Lynden to the public. This required an extensive renovation of the house and some of the grounds. The house has been transformed by Uihlein-Wilson Architects using sustainable building practices. The newly created public spaces include a conference room, a large classroom/studio, a gallery and a glassed-in function space overlooking the large patio.

Renamed the Lynden Sculpture Garden, the site officially opened to the public on May 30, 2010, with expanded educational, exhibition, and community programming.

== Artists and works ==
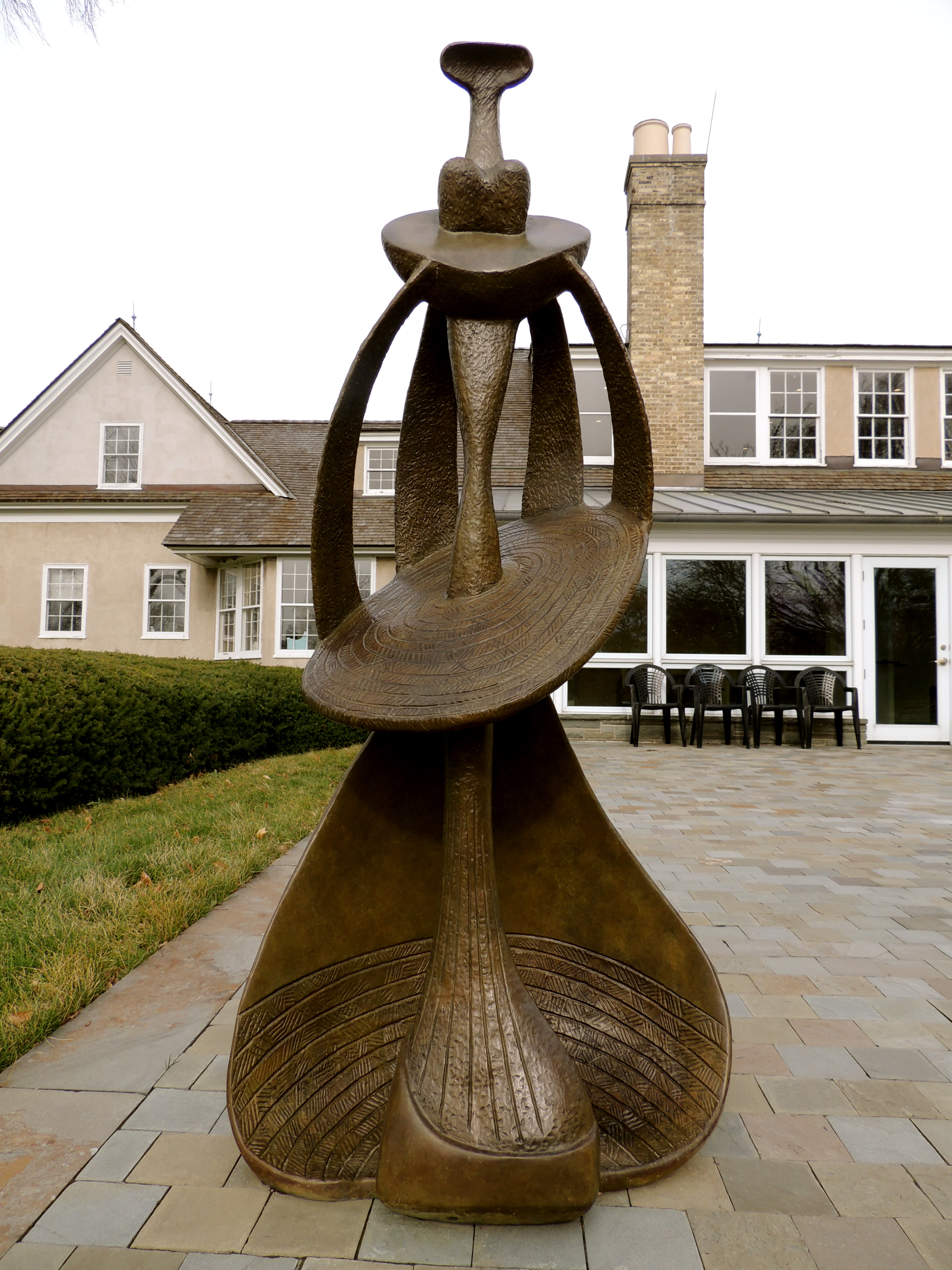
Alexander Archipenko, Queen of Sheba, 1961

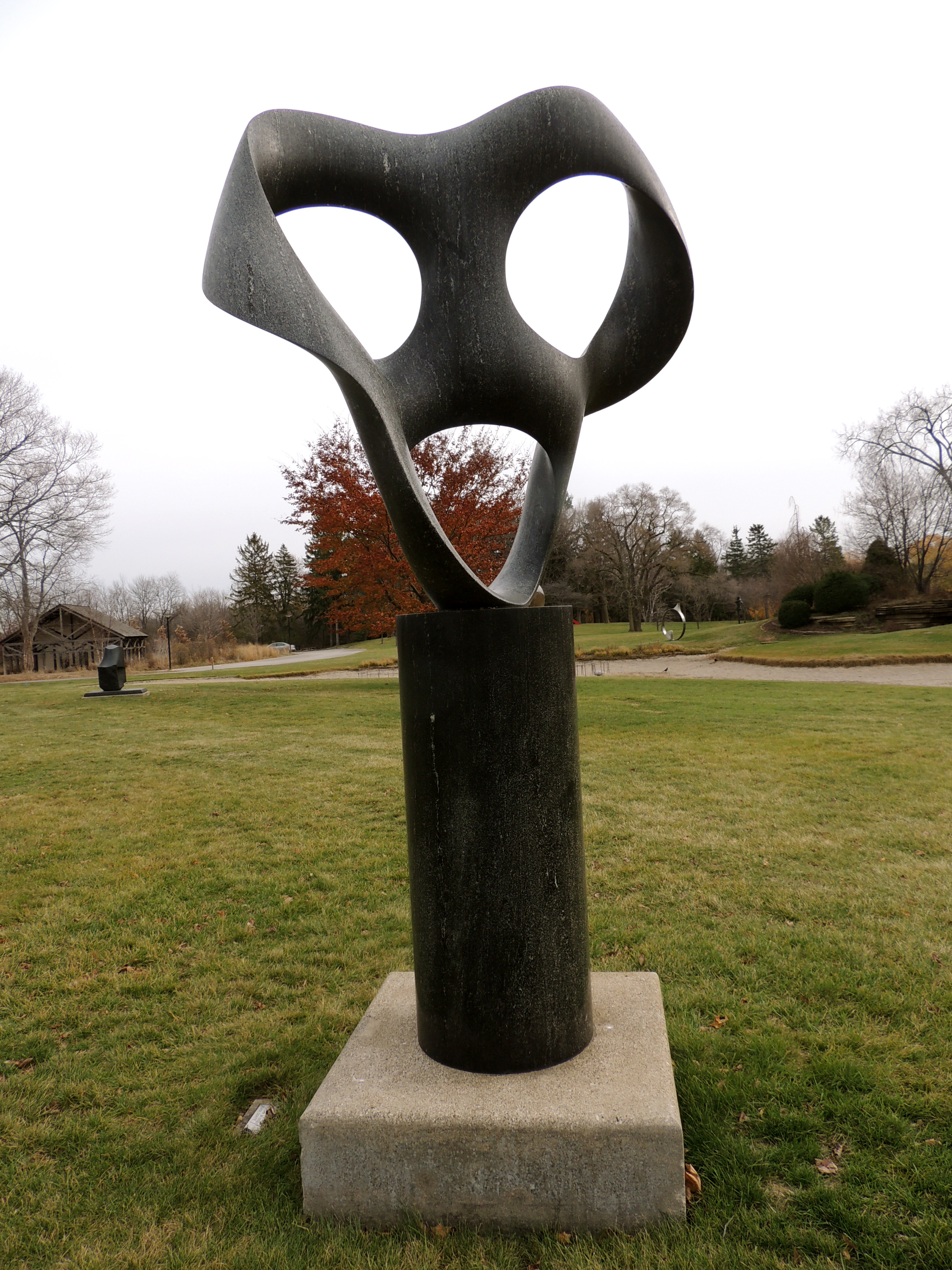
Max Bill, Rhythm in Space, 1967

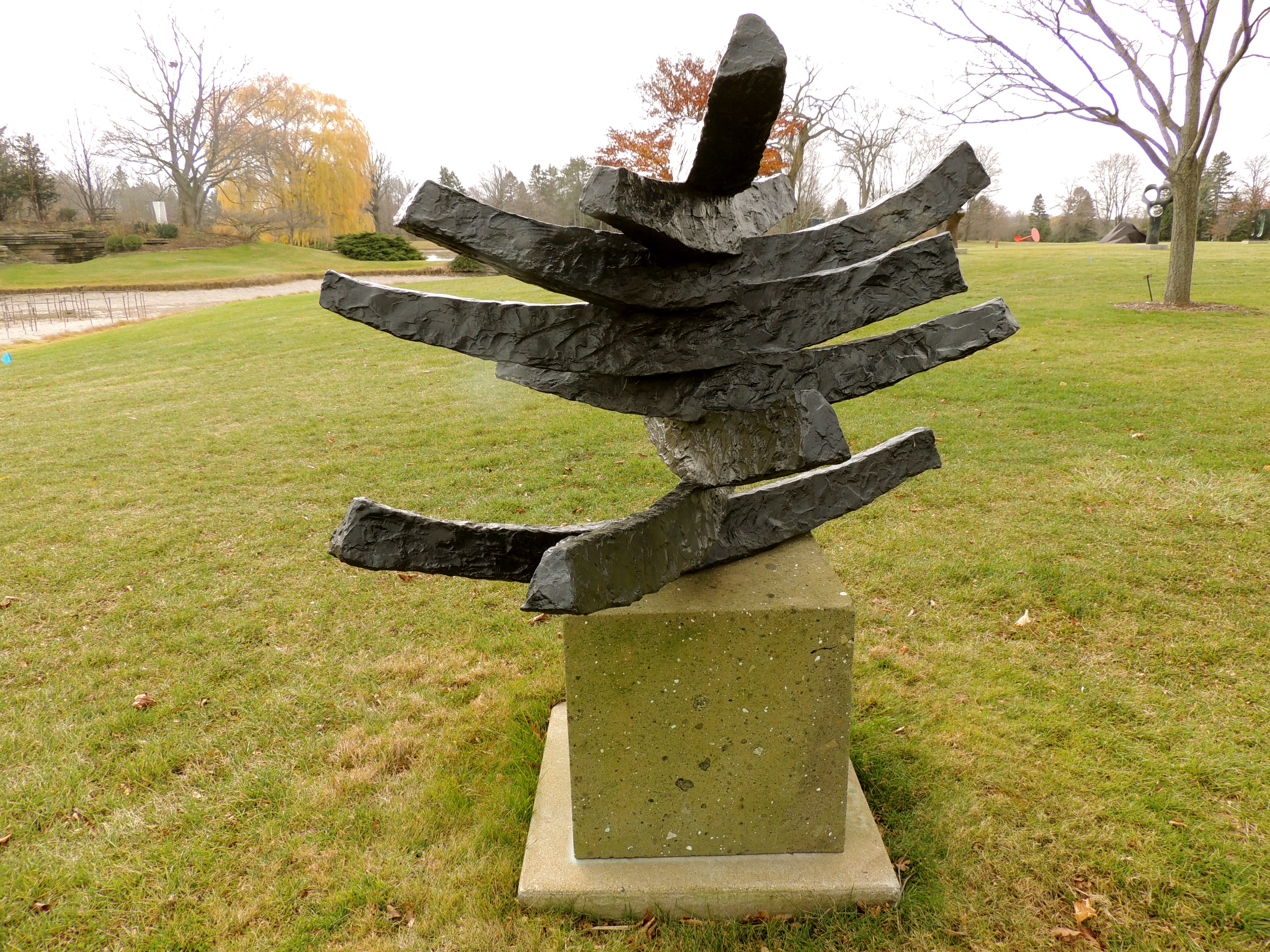
Aldo Calo, Orizzontale, 1964

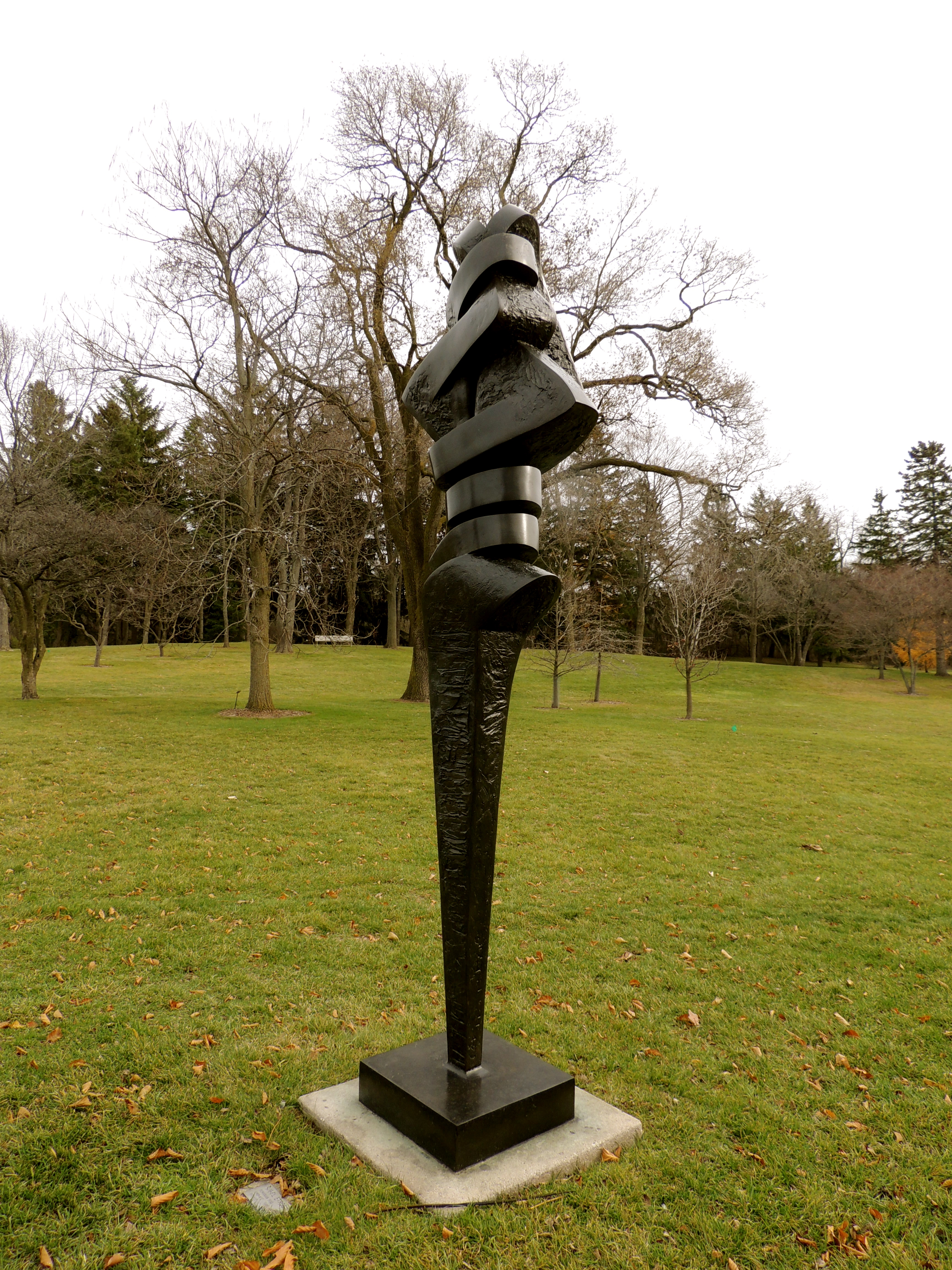
Sorel Etrog, Embrace, 1966-67

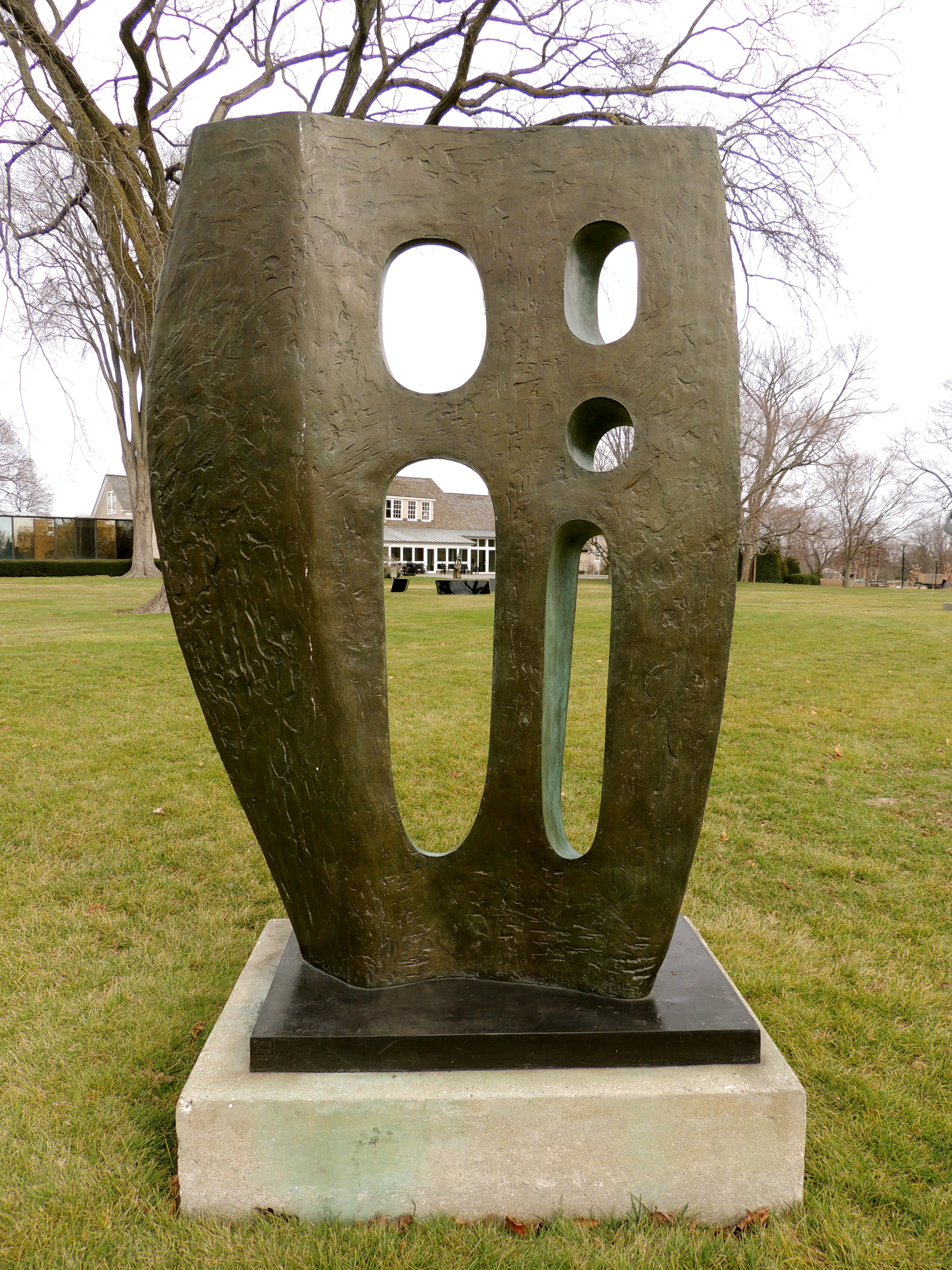
Barbara Hepworth, Sea Form (Atlantic), 1964

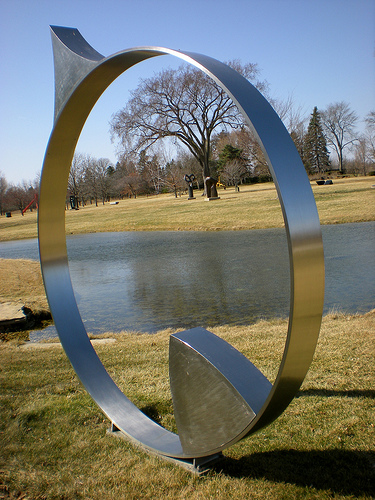
Bernard Kirschenbaum, Way Four

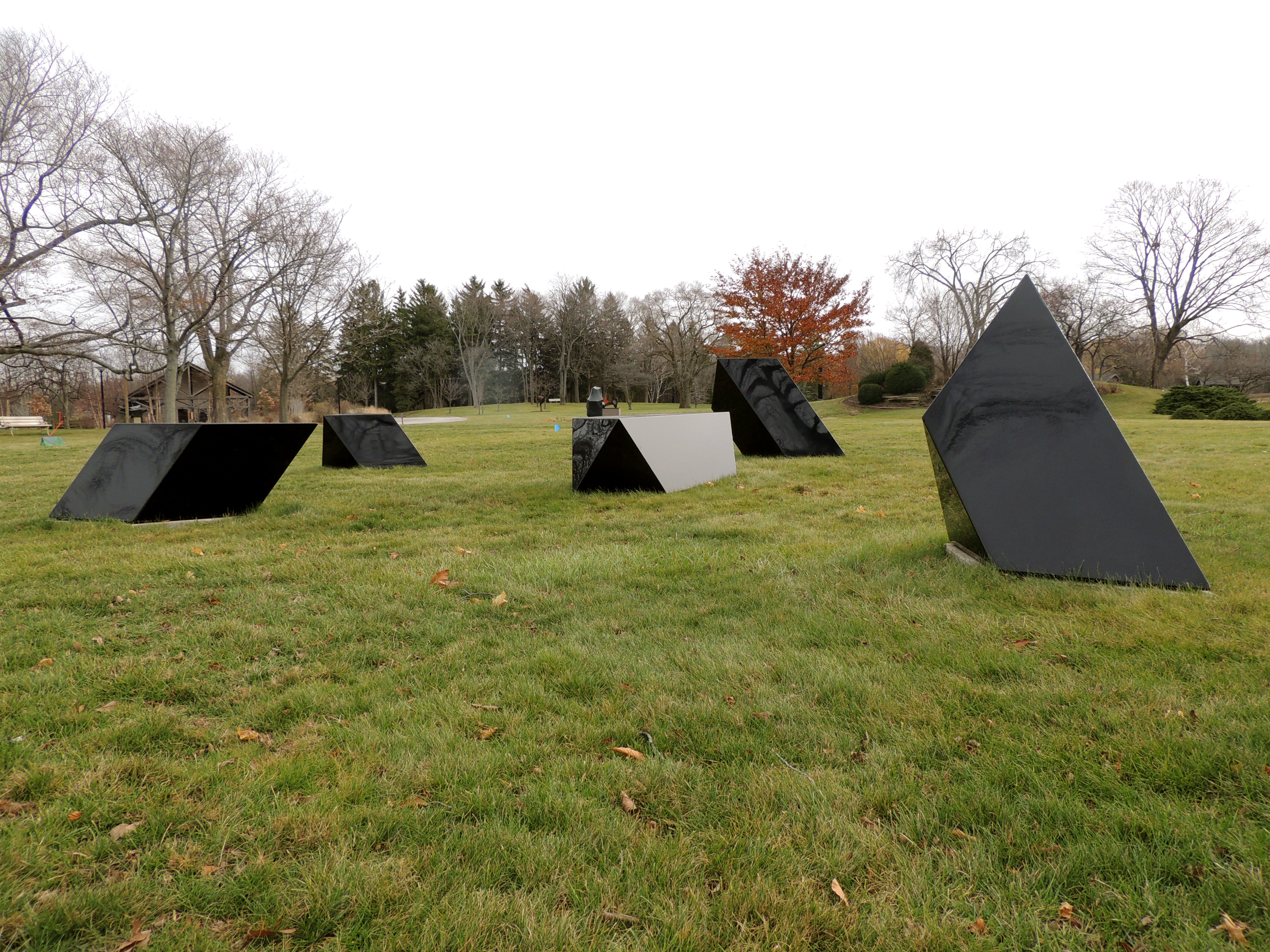
Tony Smith, Wandering Rocks, 1967-69

== Temporary exhibitions and performances ==
In addition to its permanent outdoor sculpture collection, Lynden hosts a number of temporary exhibitions and performances each year. Some of these are drawn from the Bradley Family Foundation collection, which includes paintings, works on paper and small sculptures. Others feature works by contemporary artists.

Since opening to the public in 2010, Lynden has presented performances by Eiko & Koma, the Echo Park Film Center Filmmobile, WildSpace Dance Company, Nora Chipaumire, Present Music, Trisha Brown Dance Company, and Reggie Wilson/Fist and Heel Performance Group.

== Bibliography ==
- Gurda, John (1992). The Bradley Legacy: Lynde and Harry Bradley, Their Company, and Their Foundation. Milwaukee, WI: Lynde and Harry Bradley Foundation. ISBN 978-0966878202.
